= List of bridges on U.S. Route 101 in Oregon =

This is a list of bridges and tunnels longer than 100 feet (30 m) on U.S. Route 101 in Oregon, also known as the Oregon Coast Highway, from south to north. Many of them were designed by Conde McCullough.

Milepoint	Name	Crosses	Built	Length (ft)	Notes
362.61		Winchuck River	1965	360	
357.98		Chetco River	1972	1114	
347.78	Thomas Creek Bridge	Thomas Creek	1961	956	Designed by Ivan D. Merchant.
339.10		Pistol River	1962	570	
336.94		Myers Creek	1961	300	
330.48		Hunter Creek	1959	360	
327.70	Isaac Lee Patterson Bridge	Rogue River	1932	1938	Designed by Conde McCullough; on the NRHP. Constructed by the Mercer, Fraser Company of Eureka, California
316.98		Euchre Creek	1955	182	
315.53	Frankport Viaduct	N/A	2004	300	
313.02		Myrtle Creek	1955	112	
311.40		Reinhart Creek	1954	356	
309.56		Brush Creek	1955	150	
306.35	Brush Creek Bridge	Brush Creek	2000	218	
303.72	Rocky Point Viaduct	N/A	1995	398	
302.28		Hubbard Creek	1984	138	
299.99		Garrison Slough	1976	500	
297.37		Elk River	1969	680	
295.75		Sixes River	1971	500	
295.49		Crystal Creek	1971	103	
288.50		Floras Creek	1967	431	
259.65	Bullards Bridge	Coquille River	1952	702	Vertical-lift bridge
244.82		Davis Slough	2001	442	
244.01		Southport Creek	2018	202	Replaced a failed culvert
241.82		Shingle House Slough	1989 (SB), 1990 (NB)	172 (SB), 137 (NB)	
239.20		Coalbank Slough	1987	362	
234.76	North Bend Overcrossing	Central Oregon and Pacific Railroad	1935	161	
233.99	Conde McCullough Memorial Bridge	Coos Bay	1936	5308	Designed by Conde McCullough as the North Bend Bridge; on the NRHP.
233.09	Haynes Inlet Bridge	Haynes Inlet	2004	770	
223.21		Tenmile Creek	1954, 1989 on frontage road	420	
213.23		Ranch Road	1966	133	
212.27		Scholfield Creek	1952	360	
211.21	Umpqua River Bridge	Umpqua River	1936	2206	Designed by Conde McCullough; on the NRHP. Includes a swing span.
210.88		Central Oregon and Pacific Railroad	2000	115	
210.46		Smith River	1999	1646	
202.72		Tahkenitch Creek	1929	205	
196.94		Siltcoos River	1930	172	
190.98	Siuslaw River Bridge	Siuslaw River	1936	1649	Designed by Conde McCullough; on the NRHP. Includes a bascule-type draw span. Constructed by Mercer-Fraser Company of Eureka, California
184.78		Sutton Creek	1930	110	
178.82	Slide Viaduct	N/A	1962	165	
178.75	Slide Viaduct	N/A	1962	143	
178.49	Cape Creek Tunnel	N/A	1932	704	
178.35	Cape Creek Bridge	Cape Creek	1932	649	Designed by Conde McCullough; on the NRHP.
175.02	Big Creek Bridge	Big Creek	1931	235	Designed by Conde McCullough; on the NRHP.
174.40		Rock Creek	1931	200	
171.44	Ten Mile Creek Bridge	Tenmile Creek	1931	180	Designed by Conde McCullough; on the NRHP.
169.94		Bob Creek	2004	110	
168.44	Cummins Creek Bridge	Cummins Creek	1931	185	Designed by Conde McCullough
167.51		Cooks Chasm	2003	159	
164.73		Yachats River	1977	223	
160.15		Big Creek	1929	120	
155.52	Alsea Bay Bridge	Alsea Bay	1992	2910	Designed by HNTB; replaced a 1936 bridge designed by Conde McCullough.
149.02		Beaver Creek	1928	152	
141.67	Yaquina Bay Bridge	Yaquina Bay	1934	3223	Designed by Conde McCullough; on the NRHP.
133.86		Spencer Creek	1947	182	There's also a 1999 temporary bridge (392 feet) for diversion before 2000.
130.03	Rocky Creek Bridge No. 01089 (Ben Jones Bridge)	Rocky Creek	1927	360	On the old alignment of US 101; designed by Conde McCullough; on the NRHP.
127.61	Depoe Bay Bridge	Depoe Bay	1927	312	Designed by Conde McCullough; on the NRHP.
125.20		Fogarty Creek	1955	126	
120.84		Millport Slough	1941	210	
120.16		Siletz River	1973	920	
119.27		Drift Creek	1945	210	
118.17		Schooner Creek	1945	286	
104.70		Salmon River	1960	170	
98.94		Neskowin Creek	1960	130	
91.79		Little Nestucca River	1980	619	
85.01		Three Rivers	1949	138	
84.08		Nestucca River	1991	265	
80.32		Beaver Creek	1916	120	
79.61		Beaver Creek	1916	107	
71.18		Fawcett Creek	1950	102	
67.98		Trask River	1949	338	
65.55		Hoquarten Slough	1931	115	
65.12		Dougherty Slough	2000	133	
64.23	Wilson River Bridge	Wilson River	1931	180	Designed by Conde McCullough; on the NRHP.
64.14		Wilson River Slough	1931	120	
63.48		Port of Tillamook Bay Railroad	1931	180	
62.94		Kilchis River	1952	276	
62.67		Stasek Slough	1952	225	
62.40		Hathaway Slough	1952	150	
59.32		Port of Tillamook Bay Railroad	1962	181	
56.99		Miami River	1991	204	
49.17		Lake Lytle	1938	153	
46.60		Port of Tillamook Bay Railroad	1984	321	
45.68		Nehalem River	1984	1062	
40.86	half viaduct		1940	375	
40.71	Chasm Bridge	Neahkahnie Mountain Chasm	1937	102	Designed by Glenn S. Paxson
40.65	half viaduct	N/A	1940	120	
40.58	half viaduct	N/A	1940	120	
39.53	Sam Reed Bridge	Necarney Creek	1937	602	Designed by Glenn S. Paxson
39.14		Short Sand Beach Creek	1937	120	
35.80	Arch Cape Tunnel	Arch Cape	1937	1228	
35.57		Arch Cape Creek	1937	166	
34.05	Austins Point Half Viaduct	N/A	1933	132	
28.70		Ecola Creek	1952	156	
28.37		Alt. US 101 entrance ramp	2003	118	
25.27		US 26	1987	150	
24.10		Necanicum River	1930	172	
19.72		Neawanna Creek	1930	208	
4.91	New Youngs Bay Bridge	Youngs Bay	1966	4209	Bypassed the Lewis and Clark River Bridge (1924, 828 ft (252 m), Lewis and Clark River) and Old Youngs Bay Bridge (1921, 1766 ft), both designed by Conde McCullough and now on US 101 Business. Is a vertical-lift bridge.
0.00	Astoria-Megler Bridge	Columbia River	1966	21474	Designed by William A. Burgee.

== See also ==
- Lists of Oregon-related topics
