= List of bridges documented by the Historic American Engineering Record in Oregon =

This is a list of bridges documented by the Historic American Engineering Record in the US state of Oregon.

== Bridges ==
Survey No.	Name (as assigned by HAER)	Status	Type	Built	Documented	Carries	Crosses	Location	County	Coordinates
OR-7	Burlington Northern Railroad Bridge	Replaced	Swing span	1908	1985	Burlington Northern Railroad	Willamette River	Portland	Multnomah	45°34′38″N 122°44′48″W
OR-8	Jordan Covered Bridge	Replaced	Howe truss	1937	1985	CR 829	Thomas Creek	Scio	Linn	44°43′35″N 122°41′56″W
OR-10	Siuslaw River Bridge (Note: See also HAER No. OR-54, "Oregon Historic Highway Bridges" for additional documentation)	Replaced	Warren truss	1912	1986	CR 5018 (Richardson Road)	Siuslaw River	Walton	Lane	44°00′21″N 123°42′06″W
OR-13	Four Mile Bridge	Replaced	Timber arch	1943	1988	Copper Creek Road	Molalla River, Table Rock Fork	Molalla	Clackamas	44°57′42″N 122°24′35″W
OR-14	Alsea Bay Bridge	Replaced	Reinforced concrete through arch	1936	1990	US 101 (Oregon Coast Highway)	Alsea Bay	Waldport	Lincoln	44°25′55″N 124°04′14″W
OR-15	Horse Creek Covered Bridge	Demolished	Howe truss	1930	1987	Horse Creek Road	Horse Creek	McKenzie Bridge	Lane	43°01′24″N 123°17′23″W
OR-19	Hayden Bridge	Extant	Whipple truss	1882	1990	Southern Pacific Railroad	McKenzie River	Springfield	Lane	44°04′19″N 122°57′51″W
OR-20	Hawthorne Bridge (Note: See also HAER No. OR-55, "Willamette River Bridges" for additional documentation)	Extant	Vertical-lift bridge	1910	1990	Hawthorne Boulevard and Madison Street	Willamette River	Portland	Multnomah	45°30′48″N 122°40′15″W
OR-21	Steel Bridge	Extant	Vertical-lift bridge	1912	1990	OR 99	Willamette River	Portland	Multnomah	45°31′39″N 122°40′09″W
OR-22	Broadway Bridge	Extant	Rolling lift (Rall) bascule	1913	1990	Broadway Street	Willamette River	Portland	Multnomah	45°31′55″N 122°40′26″W
OR-23	Shepperd's Dell Bridge (Note: See also HAER No. OR-56, "Columbia River Highway Bridges" for additional documentation)	Extant	Reinforced concrete open-spandrel arch	1914	1990	Columbia River Highway	Young Creek	Latourell	Multnomah	45°32′48″N 122°11′52″W
OR-24	Latourell Creek Bridge	Extant	Reinforced concrete open-spandrel arch	1914	1990	Columbia River Highway	Latourell Creek	Latourell	Multnomah	45°32′19″N 122°13′08″W
OR-26	Grave Creek Bridge	Extant	Howe truss	1920	2000	Sunny Valley Loop Road	Grave Creek	Sunny Valley	Josephine	42°38′10″N 123°22′39″W
OR-27	Mill Creek Bridge	Replaced	Reinforced concrete girder	1920	1990	West Sixth Street	Mill Creek	The Dalles	Wasco	45°36′16″N 121°11′19″W
OR-29	Rock Point Arch Bridge	Extant	Reinforced concrete open-spandrel arch	1920	1990	OR 99 / OR 234 (Sams Valley Highway No. 271)	Rogue River and Old Pacific Highway	Gold Hill	Jackson	42°25′57″N 123°05′25″W
OR-30	Dry Canyon Creek Bridge	Extant	Reinforced concrete open-spandrel arch	1921	1990	US 30 (Mosier–The Dalles Highway No. 292)	Dry Canyon Creek	Rowena	Wasco	45°40′53″N 121°18′13″W
OR-31	Oregon City Bridge	Extant	Reinforced concrete through arch	1922	1990	OR 43 (Oswego Highway No. 3)	Willamette River	Oregon City and West Linn	Clackamas	45°21′33″N 122°36′35″W
OR-32	Coquille River Bridge	Demolished	Swing span	1922	1990	OR 42 (Coquille–Bandon Highway No. 244)	Coquille River	Coquille	Coos	43°10′25″N 124°11′35″W
OR-33	Winchester Bridge	Extant	Reinforced concrete open-spandrel arch	1924	1990	OR 99 (Pacific Highway)	North Umpqua River	Winchester	Douglas	43°16′59″N 123°21′19″W
OR-34	Albany Bridge	Extant	Parker truss	1926	1990	US 20 (Albany–Corvallis Highway No. 31) eastbound	Willamette River	Albany	Linn	44°38′21″N 123°06′24″W
OR-35	Crooked River High Bridge	Extant	Steel hinged arch	1926	1990	US 97 (The Dalles–California Highway No. 4)	Crooked River	Terrebonne	Deschutes	44°23′33″N 121°11′39″W
OR-36-A	Historic Columbia River Highway, Sandy River Bridge at Troutdale	Extant	Pratt truss	1912	1994	Historic Columbia River Highway	Sandy River	Troutdale	Multnomah	45°32′18″N 122°22′36″W
OR-36-B	Historic Columbia River Highway, Stark Street Bridge	Extant	Parker truss	1914	1994	Southeast Stark Street	Sandy River	Troutdale	Multnomah	45°30′55″N 122°21′41″W
OR-36-C	Historic Columbia River Highway, Crown Point Viaduct	Extant	Reinforced concrete cast-in-place slab	1914	1994	Historic Columbia River Highway	Crown Point	Troutdale	Multnomah	45°32′22″N 122°14′39″W
OR-36-E	Historic Columbia River Highway, Bridal Veil Falls Bridge	Extant	Reinforced concrete girder	1914	1995	Historic Columbia River Highway	Bridal Veil Falls	Troutdale	Multnomah	45°33′15″N 122°10′49″W
OR-36-F	Historic Columbia River Highway, Wahkeena Falls Footbridge	Extant	Reinforced concrete closed-spandrel arch	1914	1994	Historic Columbia River Highway	Wahkeena Falls	Troutdale	Multnomah	45°34′28″N 122°07′39″W
OR-36-G	Historic Columbia River Highway, West Multnomah Falls Viaduct	Extant	Reinforced concrete cast-in-place slab	1914	1995	Historic Columbia River Highway	Oregon Railroad and Navigation Company	Troutdale	Multnomah	45°34′38″N 122°07′17″W
OR-36-H	Historic Columbia River Highway, Multnomah Creek Bridge	Extant	Reinforced concrete closed-spandrel arch	1914	1994	Historic Columbia River Highway	Multnomah Falls	Troutdale	Multnomah	45°34′40″N 122°07′01″W
OR-36-I	Historic Columbia River Highway, Multnomah Falls Footbridge	Extant	Reinforced concrete open-spandrel arch	1914	1994	Historic Columbia River Highway	Multnomah Falls	Troutdale	Multnomah	45°34′36″N 122°06′58″W
OR-36-J	Historic Columbia River Highway, East Multnomah Falls Viaduct	Extant	Reinforced concrete cast-in-place slab	1914	1994	Historic Columbia River Highway	Oregon Railroad and Navigation Company	Troutdale	Multnomah	45°34′45″N 122°06′44″W
OR-36-K	Historic Columbia River Highway, Oneonta Gorge Creek Bridge	Extant	Reinforced concrete cast-in-place slab	1914	1995	Historic Columbia River Highway	Oneonta Gorge	Troutdale	Multnomah	45°35′23″N 122°04′31″W
OR-36-M	Historic Columbia River Highway, Horsetail Falls Bridge	Extant	Reinforced concrete cast-in-place slab	1914	1995	Historic Columbia River Highway	Horsetail Falls	Troutdale	Multnomah	45°35′25″N 122°04′09″W
OR-36-N	Historic Columbia River Highway, Toothrock and Eagle Creek Viaducts	Extant	Reinforced concrete cast-in-place slab	1915	1995	Historic Columbia River Highway	Eagle Creek	Troutdale	Multnomah	45°38′19″N 121°56′03″W
OR-36-P	Historic Columbia River Highway, Eagle Creek Bridge	Extant	Reinforced concrete closed-spandrel arch	1915	1994	Historic Columbia River Highway	Eagle Creek	Troutdale	Multnomah	45°38′28″N 121°55′42″W
OR-36-R	Historic Columbia River Highway, Mitchell Point Tunnel and Viaduct	Demolished	Reinforced concrete cast-in-place slab	1915	1995	Historic Columbia River Highway	Lower Mitchell Point	Troutdale	Multnomah	45°42′15″N 121°37′01″W
OR-36-U	Historic Columbia River Highway, Mosier Creek Bridge	Extant	Reinforced concrete open-spandrel arch	1920	1994	Historic Columbia River Highway	Mosier Creek	Troutdale	Multnomah	45°41′05″N 121°23′40″W
OR-37	Gold Hill Bridge	Extant	Reinforced concrete open-spandrel arch	1927	1990	OR 99 / OR 234	Rogue River	Gold Hill	Jackson	42°25′51″N 123°02′36″W
OR-38	Bridge at Mouth of Rogue River	Extant	Reinforced concrete open-spandrel arch	1932	1990	US 101 (Oregon Coast Highway)	Rogue River	Gold Beach	Curry	42°25′38″N 124°24′48″W
OR-39	Wilson River Bridge	Extant	Reinforced concrete through arch	1931	1990	US 101 (Oregon Coast Highway)	Wilson River	Tillamook	Tillamook	45°28′42″N 123°50′40″W
OR-40	St. Johns Bridge	Extant	Suspension	1931	1990	US 30 Byp.	Willamette River	Portland	Multnomah	45°35′06″N 122°45′53″W
OR-41	Cape Creek Bridge	Extant	Reinforced concrete open-spandrel arch	1932	1990	US 101 (Oregon Coast Highway)	Cape Creek	Florence	Lane	44°08′01″N 124°07′19″W
OR-42	Santiam River Bridge	Extant	Reinforced concrete through arch	1933	1990	OR 164	Santiam River	Jefferson	Marion	44°42′54″N 123°00′50″W
OR-44	Yaquina Bay Bridge	Extant	Steel arch	1936	1990	US 101 (Oregon Coast Highway)	Yaquina Bay	Newport	Lincoln	44°37′21″N 124°03′25″W
OR-45	Umpqua River Bridge	Extant	Swing span	1936	1990	US 101 (Oregon Coast Highway)	Umpqua River	Reedsport	Douglas	43°42′36″N 124°06′03″W
OR-46	Coos Bay Bridge	Extant	Cantilever	1936	1990	US 101 (Oregon Coast Highway)	Coos Bay	North Bend	Coos	43°25′44″N 124°13′19″W
OR-49	Moffett Creek Bridge	Extant	Reinforced concrete closed-spandrel arch	1915	1995	Historic Columbia River Highway	Moffett Creek	Warrendale	Multnomah	45°37′26″N 121°58′40″W
OR-50	Columbia River Gorge Bridge at Astoria	Extant	Cantilever	1966	1990	US 101 (Oregon Coast Highway)	Columbia River	Astoria, Oregon, and Megler, Washington	Clatsop County, Oregon, and Pacific County	46°13′01″N 123°51′47″W
OR-51	Oregon Trunk Railroad Bridge	Extant	Steel hinged arch	1911	1990	Oregon Trunk Railroad	Crooked River	Terrebonne	Deschutes	44°23′28″N 121°11′46″W
OR-52	Rogue River Bridge (Caveman Bridge)	Extant	Reinforced concrete through arch		1990	OR 99 southbound	Rogue River	Grants Pass	Josephine	42°25′49″N 123°19′54″W
OR-54	Oregon Historic Highway Bridges				1990			Salem	Marion	
OR-55	Willamette River Bridges				1990		Willamette River	Portland	Multnomah	
OR-56	Columbia River Highway Bridges				1990		Columbia River	Portland	Multnomah	
OR-58	Siuslaw River Bridge	Extant	Simple trunnion bascule	1936	1990	US 101 (Oregon Coast Highway)	Siuslaw River	Florence	Lane	43°57′53″N 124°06′31″W
OR-64	New Alsea Bay Bridge	Extant	Steel arch	1993	1993	US 101 (Oregon Coast Highway)	Alsea Bay	Waldport	Lincoln	44°25′55″N 124°04′14″W
OR-66-B	Umatilla Project, East Division Irrigation System, Outlet Works Gate Tower and Bridge	Extant		1908	1995	Walkway	Cold Springs Reservoir	Hermiston	Umatilla	45°51′36″N 119°10′21″W
OR-86	Big Creek Bridge	Extant	Reinforced concrete through arch	1931	1993	US 101 (Oregon Coast Highway)	Big Creek	Florence	Lane	44°10′28″N 124°06′55″W
OR-87	Beaver Creek Bridge	Replaced	Warren truss	1915	1996	Kukkala County Road (Road 4087)	Beaver Creek	Clatskanie	Columbia	46°06′37″N 123°09′33″W
OR-88	South Fork Malheur River Bridge	Replaced	King post truss	1964	1996	Crane–Venator Road	South Fork Malheur River	Crane	Harney	43°24′29″N 118°17′00″W
OR-97	Depoe Bay Bridge	Extant	Reinforced concrete open-spandrel arch	1927	1990	US 101 (Oregon Coast Highway)	Depoe Bay	Depoe Bay	Lincoln	44°48′35″N 124°03′43″W
OR-99	East Pendleton Overcrossing	Replaced	Reinforced concrete girder	1937	1998	US 30 (Pendleton Highway)	Union Pacific Railroad	Pendleton	Umatilla	45°40′24″N 118°46′25″W
OR-100	Morrison Bridge	Extant	Simple trunnion bascule	1958	1999	Morrison Avenue	Willamette River	Portland	Multnomah	45°31′04″N 122°40′11″W
OR-101	Burnside Bridge	Extant	Strauss bascule	1926	1999	Burnside Street	Willamette River	Portland	Multnomah	45°31′23″N 122°40′01″W
OR-102	Ross Island Bridge	Extant	Cantilever	1926	1999	US 26 (Powell Boulevard)	Willamette River	Portland	Multnomah	45°30′04″N 122°39′52″W
OR-103	Sellwood Bridge	Replaced	Warren truss	1925	1999	Southeast Tacoma Street	Willamette River	Portland	Multnomah	45°27′51″N 122°39′56″W
OR-104	Fremont Bridge	Extant	Steel tied arch	1973	1999	I-405 / US 30	Willamette River	Portland	Multnomah	45°32′16″N 122°40′57″W
OR-106	Marquam Bridge	Extant	Cantilever	1966	1999	I-5	Willamette River	Portland	Multnomah	45°30′28″N 122°40′08″W
OR-107-A	Crater Lake National Park Roads, Goodbye Creek Bridge	Extant	Timber stringer	1954	2000	Munson Valley Road	Goodbye Creek	Klamath Falls	Klamath	42°52′11″N 122°09′10″W
OR-109	Robertson Bridge	Bypassed	Parker truss		1999	OR 260 (Rogue River Loop Highway No. 260)	Rogue River	Merlin	Josephine	42°29′48″N 123°29′19″W
OR-110	Drift Creek Bridge	Relocated	Howe truss	1914	1997	Drift Creek County Road	Drift Creek	Lincoln City	Lincoln	44°59′35″N 123°53′11″W
OR-111	Rocky Creek Bridge	Extant	Reinforced concrete closed-spandrel arch	1927	1999	US 101 (Oregon Coast Highway) (former)	Rocky Creek	Depoe Bay	Lincoln	44°46′43″N 124°04′17″W
OR-113-B	Oregon Electric Railroad, Cattle Pass Trestle	Extant	Trestle	1908	2000	Oregon Electric Railway	Coffee Lake Creek tributary	Garden Home	Washington	45°19′22″N 122°46′45″W
OR-113-D	Oregon Electric Railroad, Hedges Creek Trestle	Extant	Trestle	1908	2000	Oregon Electric Railway	Hedges Creek	Garden Home	Washington	45°21′25″N 122°47′39″W
OR-113-E	Oregon Electric Railroad, Hedges Creek Trestle	Extant	Trestle	1908	2000	Oregon Electric Railway	Hedges Creek	Garden Home	Washington	45°22′04″N 122°47′18″W
OR-113-F	Oregon Electric Railroad, Tualatin River Bridge	Extant	Warren truss	1908	2000	Oregon Electric Railway	Tualatin River	Garden Home	Washington	45°23′35″N 122°45′52″W
OR-113-G	Oregon Electric Railroad, Fanno Creek Trestle	Extant	Trestle	1908	2000	Oregon Electric Railway	Fanno Creek	Garden Home	Washington	45°24′04″N 122°45′26″W
OR-119	Pengra Bridge	Extant	Howe truss	1938	2004	CR 480 (Place Road)	Fall Creek	Jasper	Lane	43°57′58″N 122°50′43″W
OR-120	Short Bridge	Extant	Howe truss	1945	2004	High Deck Road	South Santiam River	Cascadia	Linn	44°23′30″N 122°30′35″W
OR-123	Gallon House Bridge	Extant	Howe truss	1917	2004	CR 647 (Gallon House Road)	Abiqua Creek	Silverton	Marion	45°01′56″N 122°47′53″W
OR-124	Larwood Bridge	Extant	Howe truss	1939	2003	CR 648 (Fish Hatchery Road)	Crabtree Creek	Lacomb	Linn	44°37′49″N 122°44′27″W
OR-125	Office Bridge	Extant	Howe truss	1944	2004	Old Mill Road	North Fork Middle Fork Willamette River	Westfir	Lane	43°45′30″N 122°29′45″W
OR-126	Neal Lane Bridge	Extant	King post truss	1939	2004	CR 124 (Neal Lane)	Myrtle Creek	Myrtle Creek	Douglas	43°01′01″N 123°16′28″W
OR-127	Lewis and Clark Bridge	Extant	Simple trunnion bascule	1924	2001	US 101 Bus.	Lewis and Clark River	Astoria	Clatsop	46°09′08″N 123°51′34″W
OR-128	Old Youngs Bay Bridge	Extant	Simple trunnion bascule	1921	2001	US 101 Bus. (Warrenton–Astoria Highway No. 9)	Youngs Bay	Astoria	Clatsop	46°10′08″N 123°50′17″W
OR-129	Neawanna Creek Bridge	Extant	Reinforced concrete T-beam	1930	2000	US 101 (Oregon Coast Highway)	Neawanna Creek	Seaside	Clatsop	46°00′39″N 123°54′41″W
OR-130	Dry Creek Bridge	Replaced	Warren truss	1935	2001	CR 697 (Harris Road)	Dry Creek	Umapine	Umatilla	45°57′44″N 118°30′24″W
OR-131	A Canal Bridge	Replaced	Reinforced concrete girder	1931	2001	Wall Street	A Canal	Klamath Falls	Klamath	42°13′47″N 121°46′38″W
OR-132	Union Avenue Viaduct	Replaced	Reinforced concrete girder	1937	1999	OR 99E (Union Avenue)	Southern Pacific Railroad	Portland	Multnomah	45°30′26″N 122°39′39″W
OR-133	Crooked River Bridge	Replaced	Warren truss	1914	2002	CR 124 (Elliot Lane)	Crooked River	Prineville	Crook	44°20′13″N 120°55′37″W
OR-134	Rogue River Bridge	Replaced	Parker truss	1950	2002	Depot Street	Rogue River	Rogue River	Jackson	42°25′53″N 123°10′15″W
OR-135	McCord Creek Bridge	Replaced	Reinforced concrete girder	1915	1997	I-84 / US 30	McCord Creek	Warrendale	Multnomah	45°36′53″N 121°59′50″W
OR-136	Goodpasture Bridge	Extant	Howe truss	1938	2004	Goodpasture Road	McKenzie River	Vida	Lane	44°08′53″N 122°35′15″W
OR-138	Applegate River Bridge No. 01985	Replaced	Parker truss	1935	2003	OR 238 (Jacksonville Highway No. 272)	Applegate River	Murphy	Josephine	42°20′38″N 123°19′58″W
OR-139	North Fork Butter Creek Bridge	Replaced	Reinforced concrete girder	1926	2003	OR 74 (Heppner Highway No. 52)	Butter Creek north fork	Pilot Rock	Umatilla	45°27′59″N 119°05′42″W
OR-140	Spring Creek Bridge	Replaced	Reinforced concrete T-beam	1948	2004	US 97 (The Dalles–California Highway No. 4)	Spring Creek	Chiloquin	Klamath	42°38′37″N 121°52′49″W
OR-141	Grande Ronde River Bridge	Bypassed	Reinforced concrete open-spandrel arch	1924	2004	US 30 (Old Oregon Trail Highway No. 6) (former)	Grande Ronde River	La Grande	Union	45°21′9″N 118°10′14″W
OR-142	Partial Viaduct	Replaced	Viaduct	1947	2004	OR 22 (North Santiam Highway No. 162)	Big Cliff Reservoir	Detroit	Marion	44°44′53″N 122°16′42″W
OR-143	Cazadero Powerhouse and Bridge	Extant	Steel arch	1907	1996	Faraday Dam access road	Clackamas River	Estacada	Clackamas	45°16′02″N 122°18′52″W
OR-144	Isthmus Slough Bridge	Replaced	Simple trunnion bascule	1955	2003	Coos–Sumner Road	Isthmus Slough	Coos Bay	Coos	43°18′03″N 124°12′31″W
OR-145	Fisher School Covered Bridge	Bypassed	Howe truss	1919	2003	Crab Creek Road (former)	Five Rivers	Fisher	Lincoln	44°17′30″N 123°50′28″W
OR-146	Ten Mile Creek Bridge	Extant	Reinforced concrete through arch	1931	2004	US 101 (Oregon Coast Highway)	Tenmile Creek	Yachats	Lincoln	44°13′27″N 124°06′35″W
OR-147	Marion Creek Bridge	Replaced	Steel built-up girder	1934	2003	OR 22 (North Santiam Highway No. 162)	Marion Creek	Marion Forks	Linn	44°36′51″N 121°56′55″W
OR-148	North Santiam River Bridge	Replaced	Steel built-up girder	1938	2003	OR 22 (North Santiam Highway No. 162)	North Santiam River	Santiam Junction	Linn	44°30′03″N 122°00′12″W
OR-149	Pamelia Creek Bridge	Replaced	Reinforced concrete girder	1934	2003	OR 22 (North Santiam Highway No. 162)	Pamelia Creek	Marion Forks	Linn	44°39′46″N 121°57′23″W
OR-150	Whitewater Creek Bridge	Replaced	Steel built-up girder	1932	2003	OR 22 (North Santiam Highway No. 162)	Whitewater Creek	Marion Forks	Linn	44°41′21″N 121°58′17″W
OR-152	Rex T. Barber Veterans Memorial Bridge	Extant	Reinforced concrete open-spandrel arch	2000	1999	US 97 (The Dalles–California Highway No. 4)	Crooked River	Terrebonne	Deschutes	44°23′35″N 121°11′35″W
OR-153	Whiteson Bridge	Replaced	Steel built-up girder	1938	1999	OR 99W (Pacific Highway West No. 91)	South Yamhill River	Whiteson	Yamhill	45°10′07″N 123°12′29″W
OR-156	Cape Arago Light Station Footbridge	Demolished	Howe truss	1938	2008	Cape Arago Lighthouse access path	Pacific Ocean	Charleston	Coos	43°20′25″N 124°22′28″W
WA-86	Vancouver–Portland Interstate Bridge	Extant	Vertical-lift bridge	1916	1993	I-5	Columbia River	Vancouver, Washington, and Portland, Oregon	Clark County, Washington, and Multnomah County, Oregon	45°37′05″N 122°40′31″W
WA-89	Longview Bridge	Extant	Cantilever	1930	1993	SR 433	Columbia River	Rainier, Oregon, and Longview, Washington	Columbia County, Oregon, and Cowlitz County, Washington	46°06′17″N 122°57′43″W

== See also ==
- List of tunnels documented by the Historic American Engineering Record in Oregon
