= Wilson River Bridge =

- Wilson River Bridge No. 01499
- U.S. National Register of Historic Places
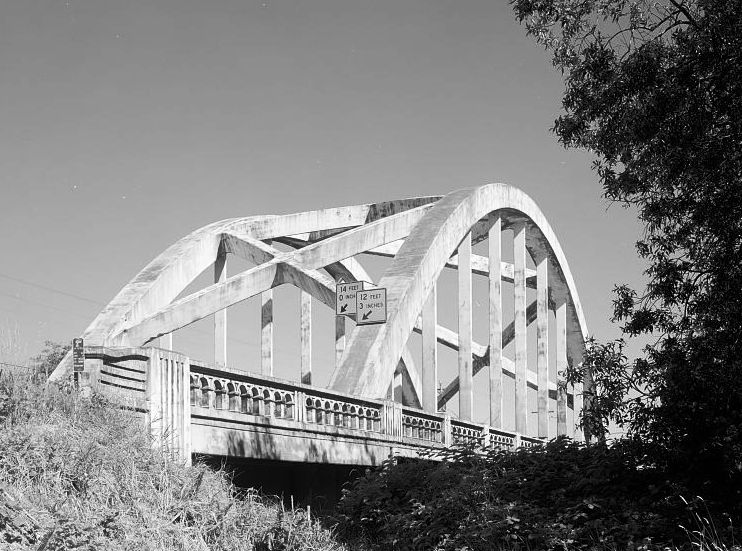
- Bridge in 1990
- Nearest city: US 101 – Tillamook
- Coordinates: 45°28′42″N 123°50′40″W
- Area: 0.3 acres (0.12 ha)
- Built: 1931
- Architect: Conde B. McCullough; Clackamas Construction Co.
- Architectural style: Classical Revival, Art Deco
- MPS: McCullough, C. B., Major Oregon Coast Highway Bridges MPS
- NRHP reference No.: 05000825
- Added to NRHP: August 5, 2005

Wilson River Bridge, also known as Wilson River Bridge at Tillamook or Wilson River Bridge No. 01499, is a bridge near Tillamook, Oregon, United States. The 1931 bridge was designed by Conde McCullough in the Classical Revival and Art Deco styles. It covers a span of 180 feet (55 m) and brings coastal U.S. Route 101 (US 101) over the Wilson River.

According to the Historic American Engineering Record description:

The Wilson River Bridge at Tillamook is the first reinforced-concrete tied-arch span built in the Pacific Northwest region of the United States. In the 1910s, its designer, Conde B. McCullough, worked for the Des Moines, Iowa bridge firm, the Marsh Engineering Company. Its founder James B. Marsh created a patented 'rainbow arch' reinforced-concrete bridge, in 1912, which he built all through the states of Kansas and Iowa in the early twentieth century. The success of the Marsh version of the reinforced-concrete tied-arch, using angle steel and concrete, may have influenced C. B. McCullough in his decision to use this form at the Wilson River and shortly thereafter, nearly identical structures over Ten Mile Creek and Big Creek in Lane County, Oregon. McCullough differed from Marsh in that he used reinforcing bar instead of steel plate in his arches. He also created the first reinforced-concrete tied-arch bridges in the Pacific Northwest, the region of the United States that includes western Montana, northern Idaho, Washington and Oregon.

It was listed on the National Register of Historic Places in 2005.

== See also ==
- List of bridges documented by the Historic American Engineering Record in Oregon
- List of bridges on U.S. Route 101 in Oregon
- List of bridges on the National Register of Historic Places in Oregon
