= Siuslaw River Bridge =

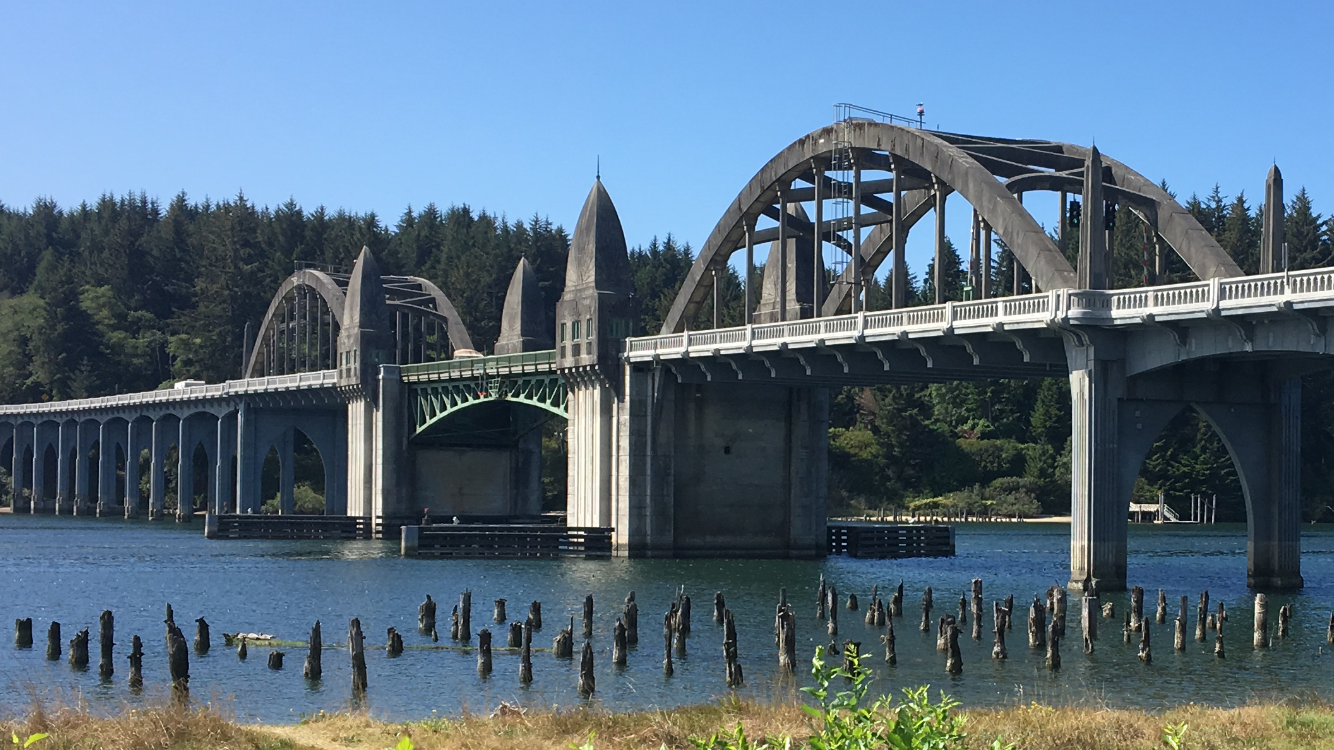
- Coordinates: 43°57′50″N 124°06′32″W
- Carries: US 101
- Crosses: Siuslaw River
- Locale: Florence, Oregon
- Maintained by: ODOT

Characteristics
- Design: Double tied-arch with central bascule draw span
- Total length: 1,568 feet (478 m)
- Longest span: 140 feet (43 m)

History
- Opened: March 31, 1936
- Siuslaw River Bridge No. 01821
- U.S. National Register of Historic Places
- Location within Oregon Location within the United States
- Location: OR Coast 9, US101, MP109.98, Florence, Oregon
- Area: 2.2 acres (0.89 ha)
- Built: 1935–36
- Built by: Mercer-Fraser Company
- Architect: Conde B. McCullough
- Architectural style: Late 19th and 20th Century Revivals, Modern Movement
- MPS: McCullough, C. B., Major Oregon Coast Highway Bridges MPS
- NRHP reference No.: 05000816
- Added to NRHP: August 5, 2005

Location
- Interactive map of Siuslaw River Bridge

The Siuslaw River Bridge is a bascule bridge that spans the Siuslaw River on U.S. Route 101 in Florence, Oregon. It was designed by Conde McCullough, built by the Mercer-Fraser Company of Eureka, California, and funded by the Federal Emergency Administration of Public Works (later renamed the Public Works Administration). It opened in 1936.

The bridge's total length is 1,568 feet (478 m). When open, the 140-foot (43 m) double-leaf bascule provides 110 feet (34 m) of horizontal clearance for boat traffic. The bascule section is flanked by two 154-foot (47 m) reinforced concrete tied arches, identical to those used in the original Alsea Bay Bridge. Four Art Deco-style obelisks house mechanical equipment as well as living quarters for the bridge operator. The total cost of the bridge was $527,000 (equivalent to $12.4 million in 2025).

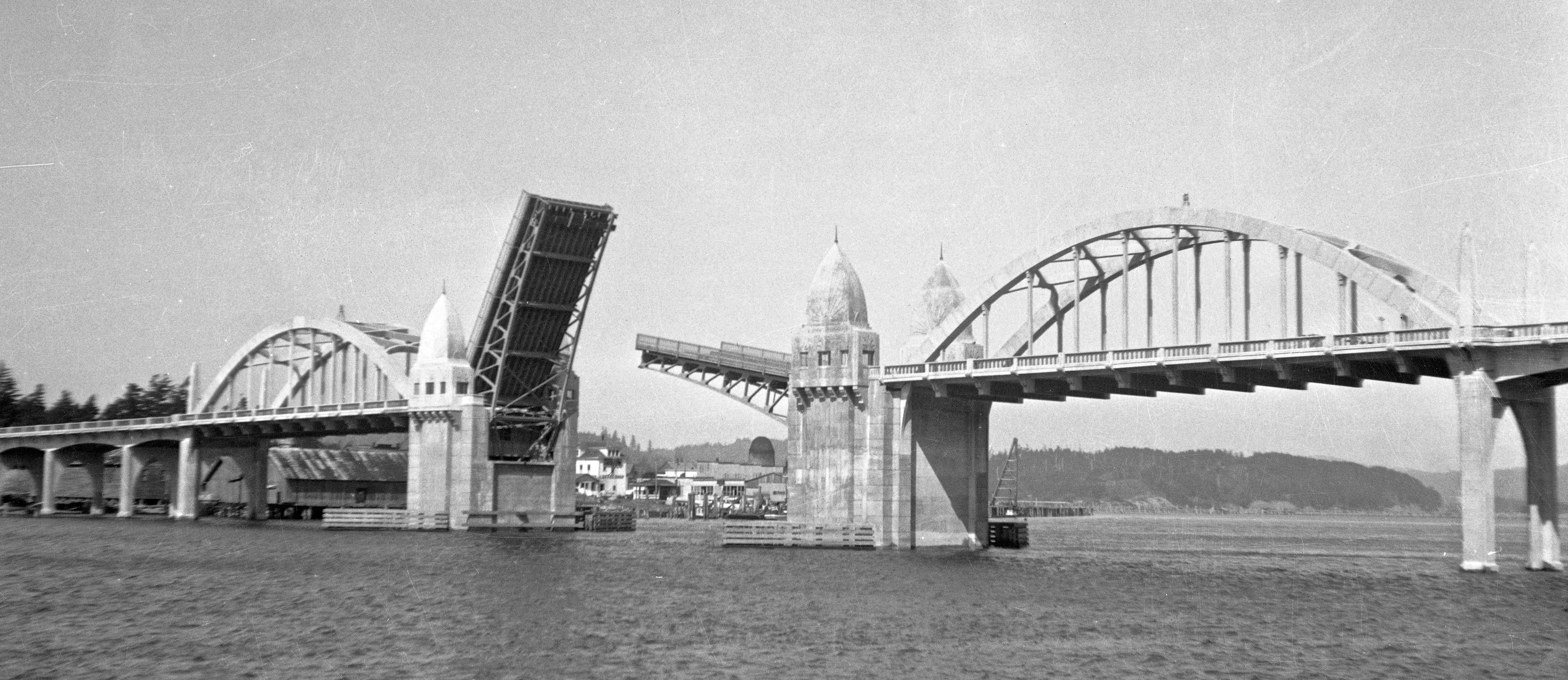
The bridge with its bascule draw span opening

The bridge was added to the National Register of Historic Places on August 5, 2005.

A new computerized control mechanism for the drawbridge was installed in 2011. It does not require an operator to be present at both the north and south portions to raise the drawbridge like the manual controls do. However, the manual system is still in working order.

== See also ==
- List of bridges documented by the Historic American Engineering Record in Oregon
- List of bridges on the National Register of Historic Places in Oregon
- List of bridges on U.S. Route 101 in Oregon
