= Yaquina Bay Bridge =

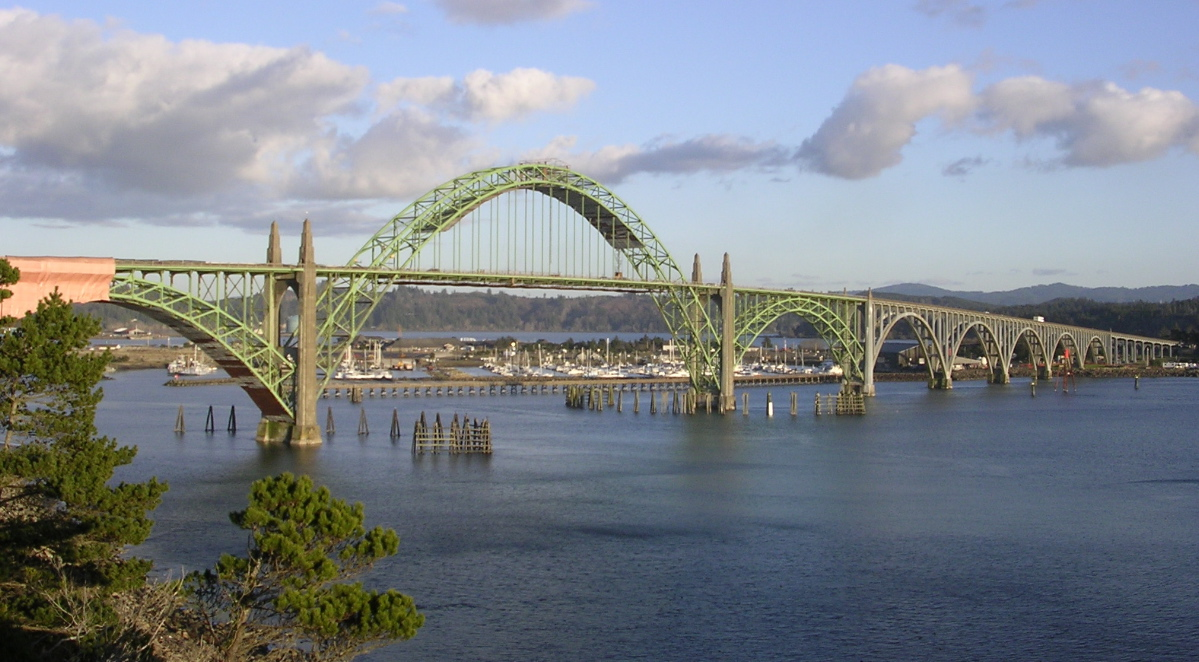
- Coordinates: 44°37′21″N 124°03′25″W
- Carries: US 101
- Crosses: Yaquina Bay
- Locale: Newport, Oregon
- Maintained by: ODOT

Characteristics
- Total length: 3,223 feet (982 m)
- Longest span: 600 feet (180 m)
- Clearance below: 133 feet (41 m)

History
- Opened: September 6, 1936
- Yaquina Bay Bridge No. 01820
- U.S. National Register of Historic Places
- Location within Oregon Location within the United States
- Location: OR Coast 9, US101, MP141.67, Newport, Oregon
- Coordinates: 44°37′19.45″N 124°3′22.9″W
- Area: 4.4 acres (1.8 ha)
- Built: 1936
- Architect: Conde B. McCullough, et al.
- MPS: McCullough, C. B., Major Oregon Coast Highway Bridges MPS
- NRHP reference No.: 05000821
- Added to NRHP: August 5, 2005

Location
- Interactive map of Yaquina Bay Bridge

The Yaquina Bay Bridge is an arch bridge that spans Yaquina Bay south of Newport, Oregon. It is one of the most recognizable of the U.S. Route 101 bridges designed by Conde McCullough and one of eleven major bridges on the Oregon Coast Highway designed by him. It superseded the last ferry crossing on the highway.

== History ==
Work on the Yaquina Bay Bridge began on August 1, 1934. The bridge opened on September 6, 1936, at a cost of $1,301,016 ($30,190,000 in today's dollars). A total of 220 people worked to pour 30,000 cubic yards (23,000 m^{3}) of concrete and fabricate 3,100 tons of steel. The contractors were the Gilpin Construction Company of Portland, Oregon, and the General Construction Company of Seattle, Washington. The main arch was built in toward the center from the anchorages, using tiebacks to support the arch until it could be closed. The piers are supported by timber pilings driven to a depth of about 70 feet (21 m) below sea level. The project received funding from the Public Works Administration.

== Description ==
The 600-foot (180 m) main span is a semi-through arch, with the roadway penetrating the middle of the arch. It is flanked by identical 350-foot (110 m) steel deck arches, with five concrete deck arches of diminishing size extending to the south landing. The main arch is marked by tall obelisk-like concrete finials on the main piers, with smaller decorative elements marking the ends of the flanking spans. The arches are built as box girders. The two-lane road is 27 feet (8.2 m) wide, running inside the arches with two 3.5-foot (1.1 m) sidewalks. The main arch is 246 feet (75 m) above sea level at its crown. Overall length of the bridge is 3,260 feet (990 m), including concrete deck-girder approach spans. The navigable channel measures 400 feet (120 m) wide by 133 feet (41 m) high.

The bridge uses Art Deco and Art Moderne design motifs as well as forms borrowed from Gothic architecture. The Gothic influence is seen in the balustrade, which features small pointed arches, and in the arches of the side span piers. The ends of the bridge are augmented by pedestrian plazas that afford a view of the bridge and provide access to the parks at the landings by stairways. Pedestals were provided for proposed sculptures of seals, but the statues were never executed.

== Designation ==
The Yaquina Bay Bridge was placed on the National Register of Historic Places on August 5, 2005.

== Gallery ==
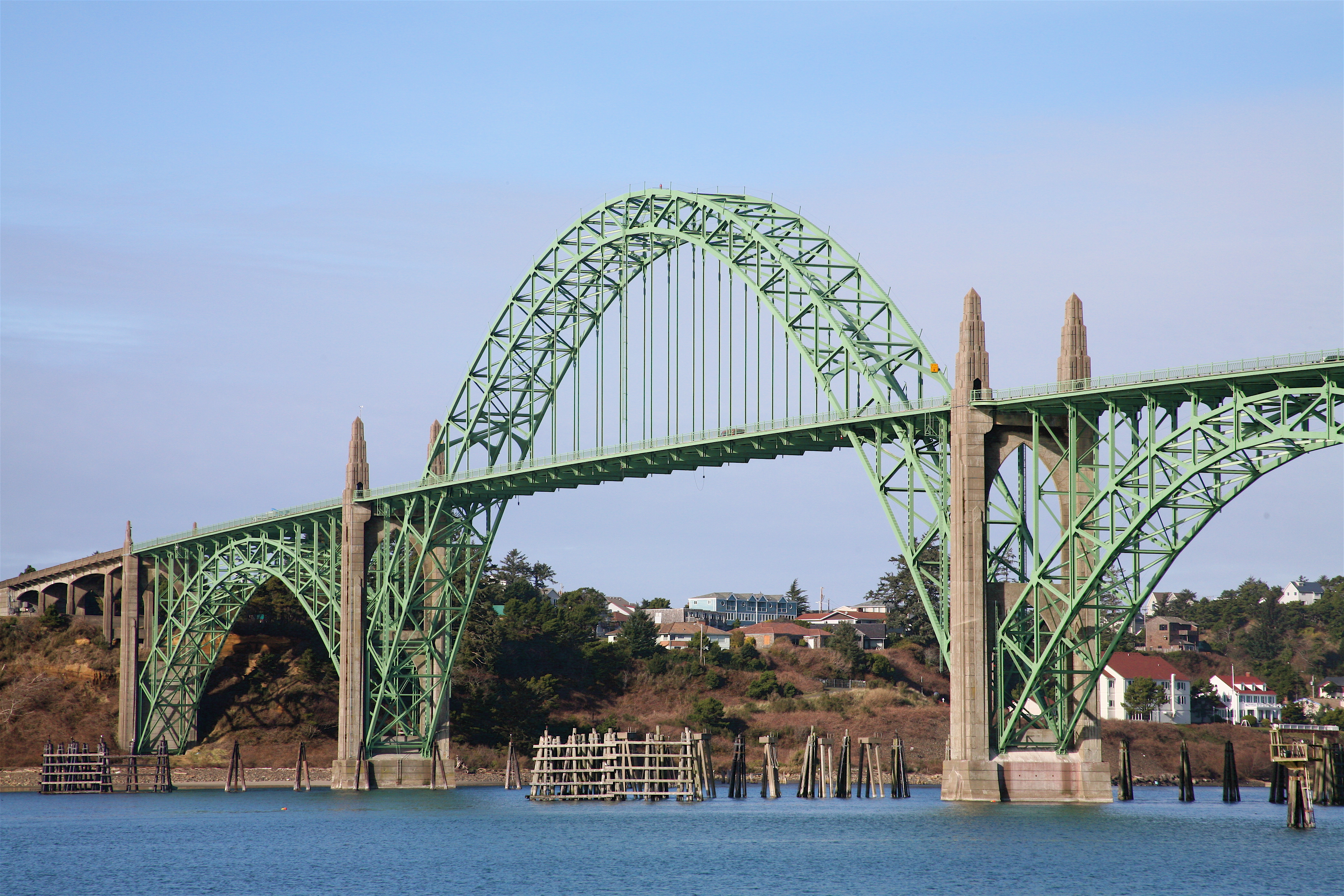
The main span

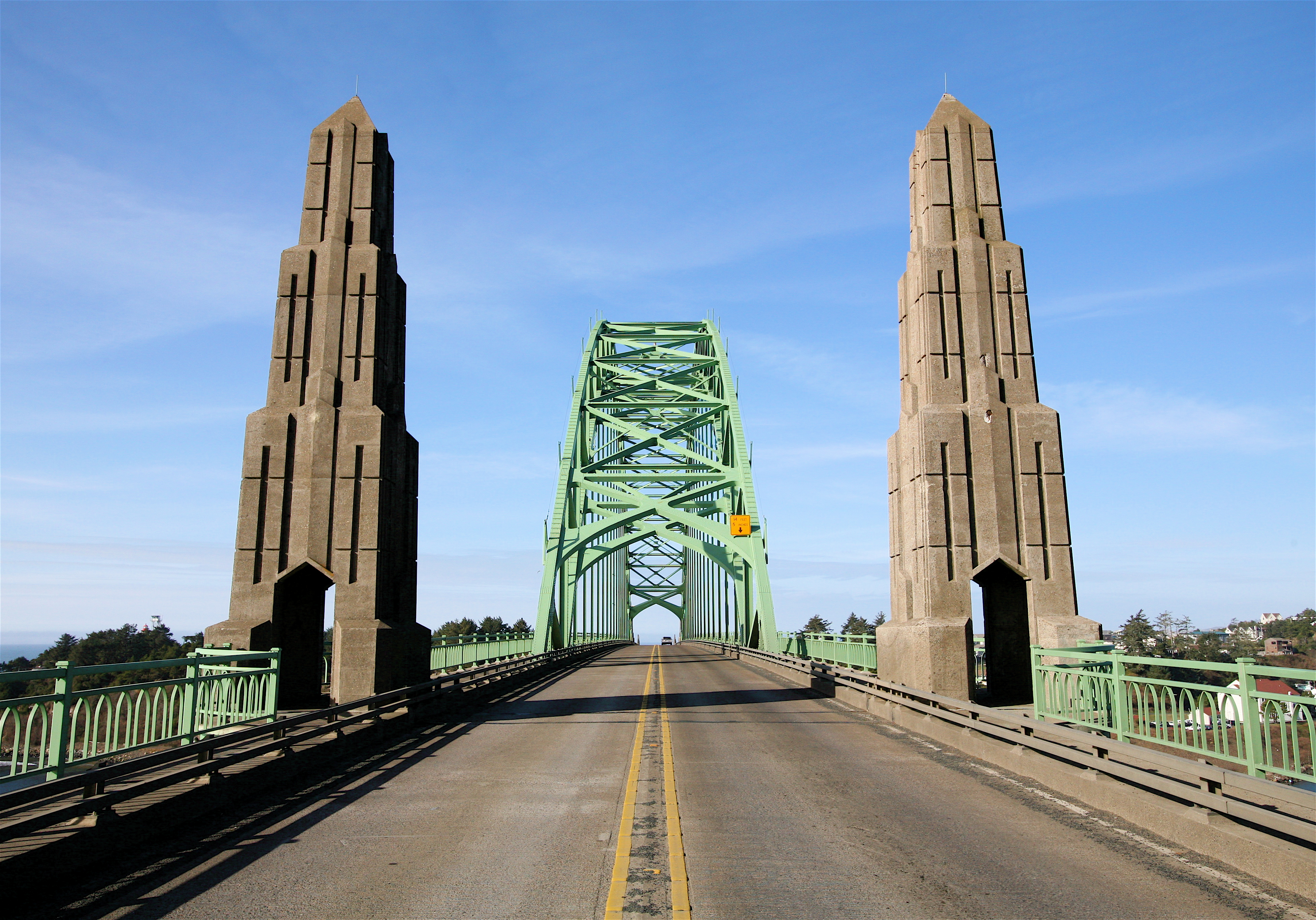
From the roadway

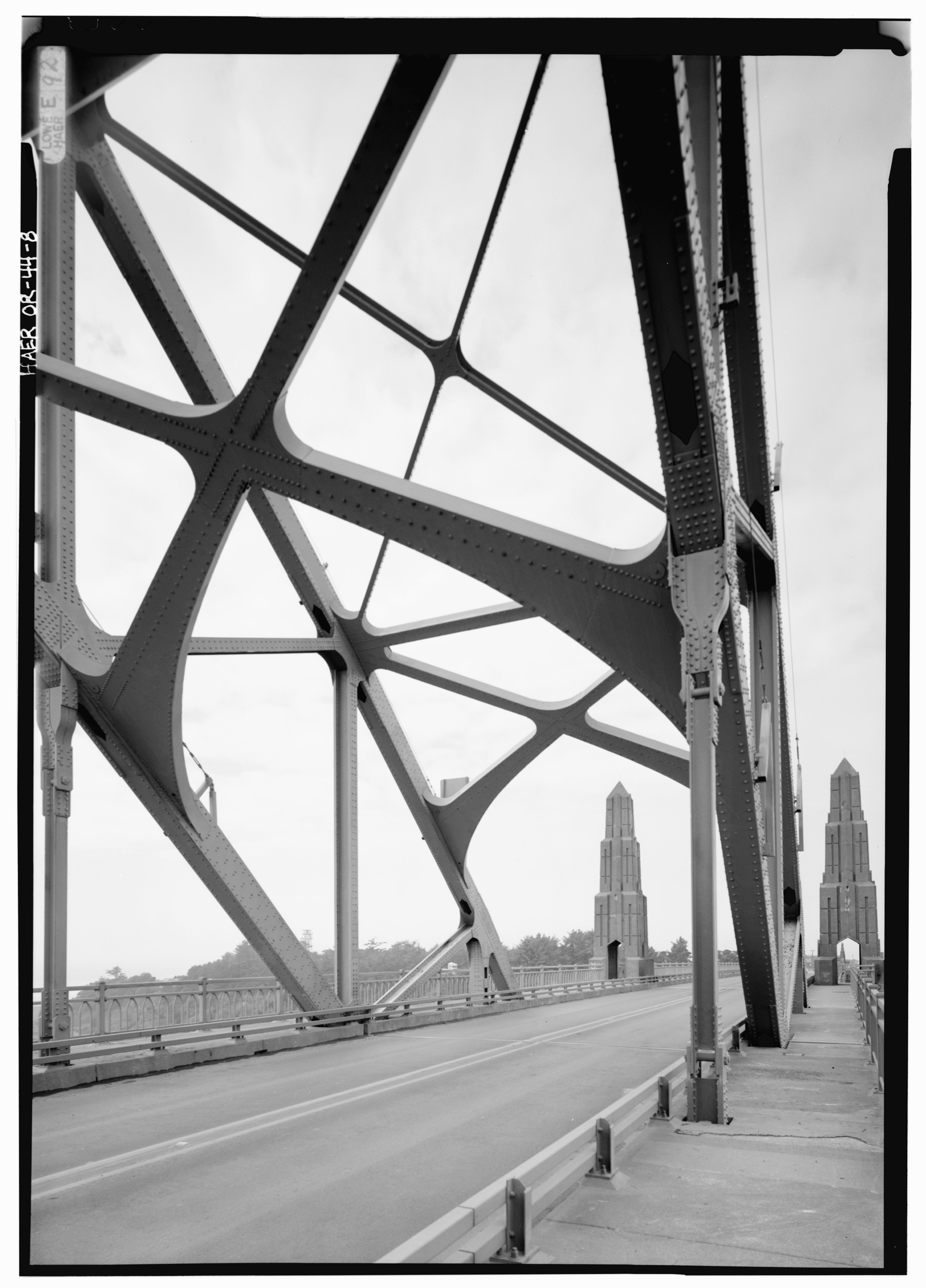
The interior of the bridge

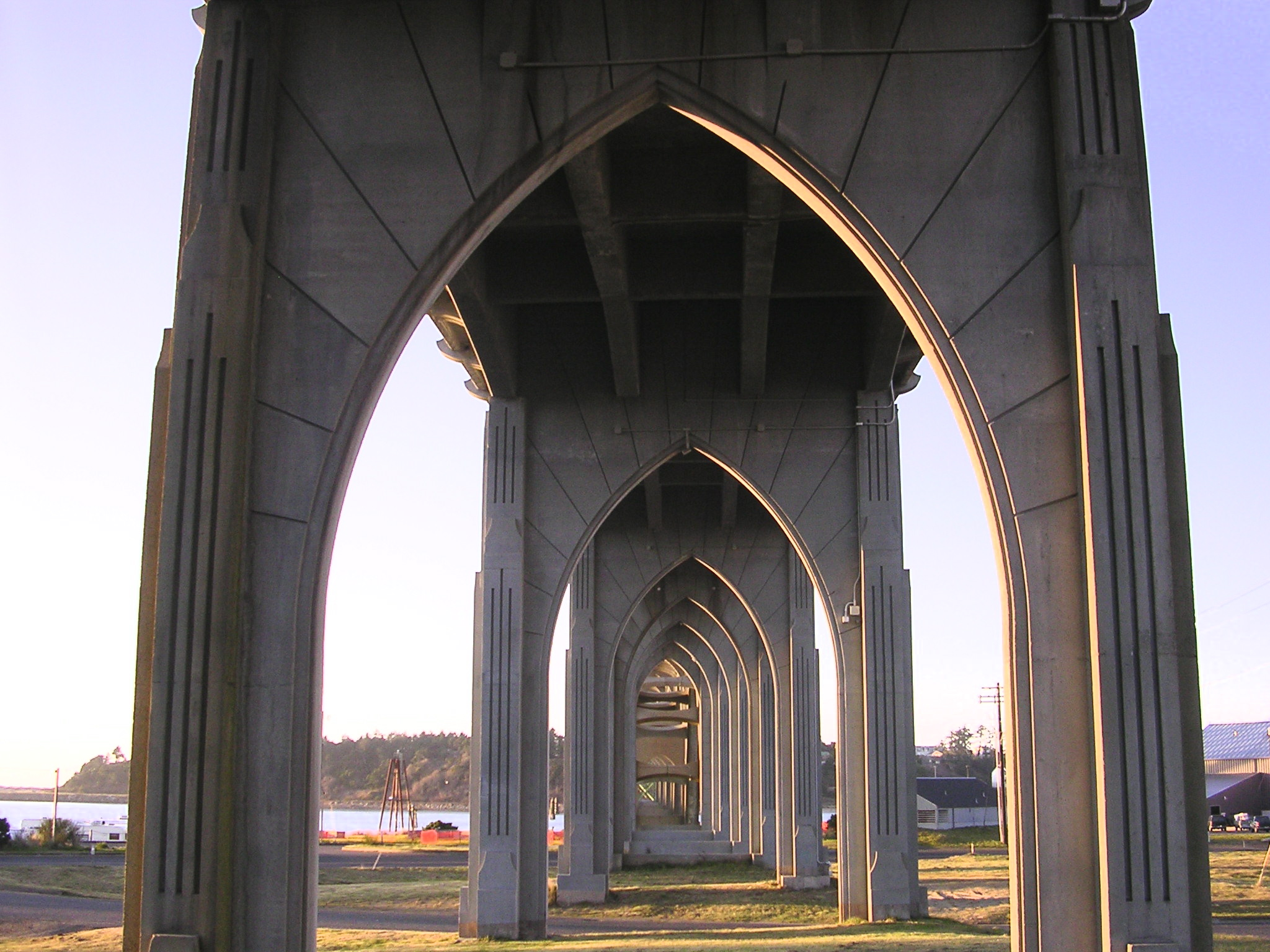
The base of the bridge

View from Newport

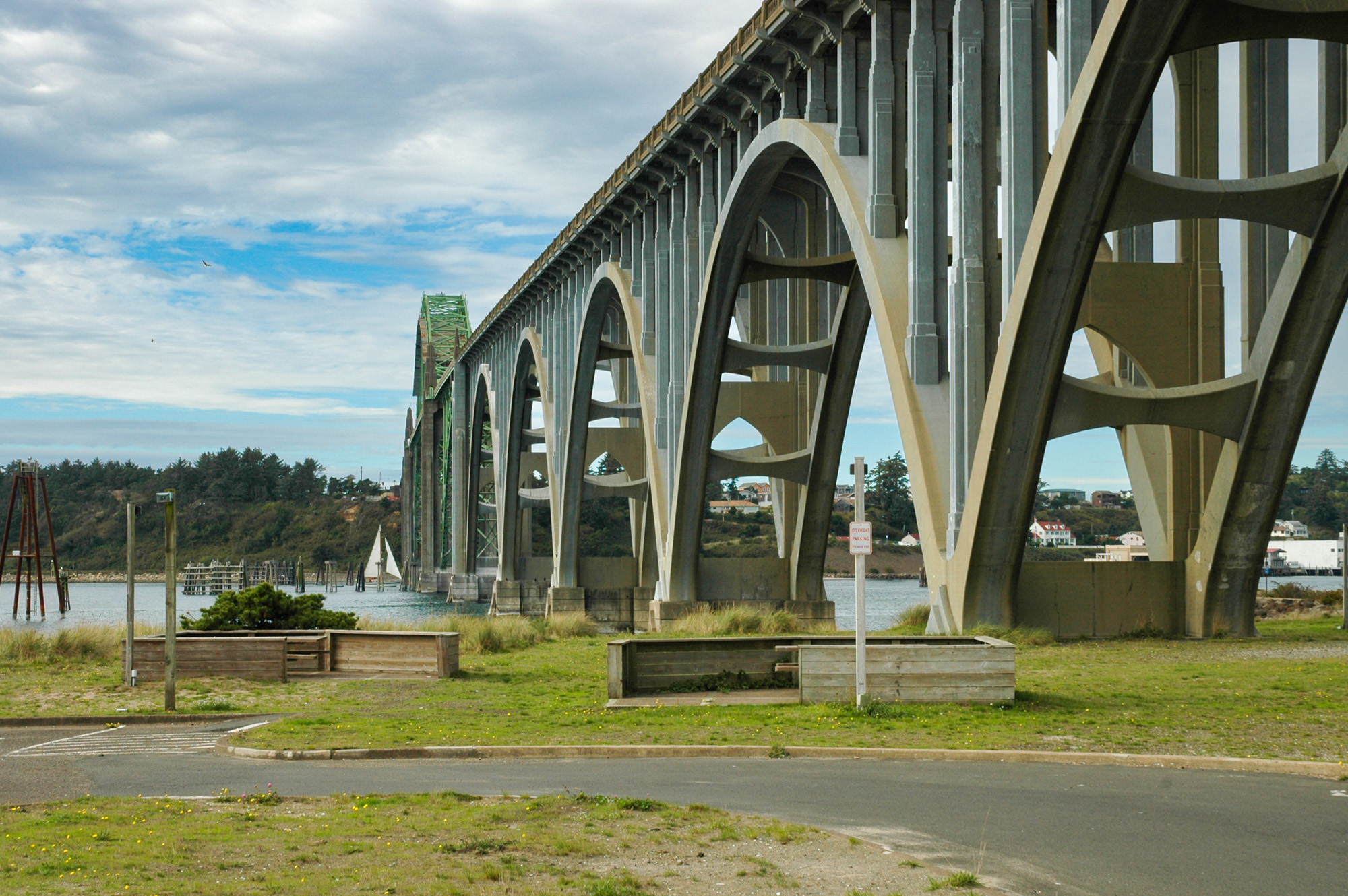
Base, picnic tables.

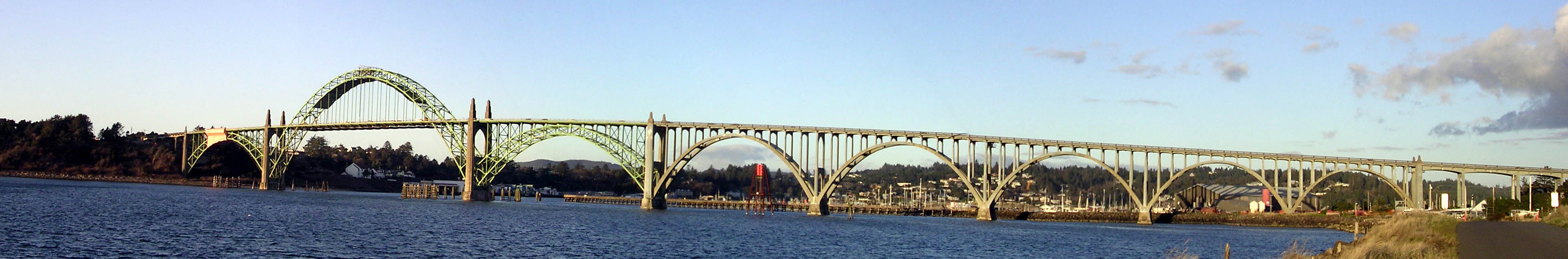
From the west

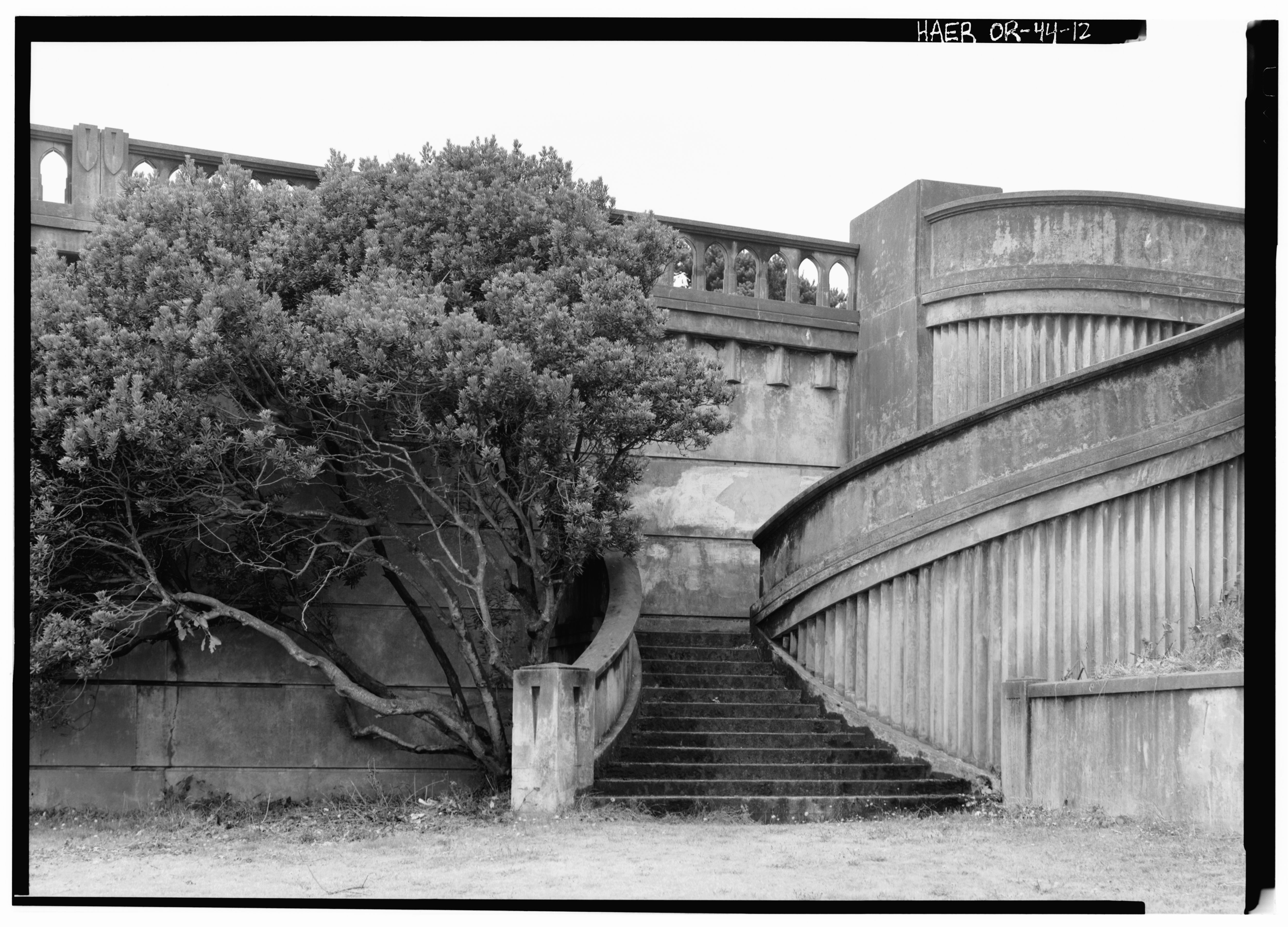
The north staircase

== See also ==
- List of bridges documented by the Historic American Engineering Record in Oregon
- List of bridges on the National Register of Historic Places in Oregon
- List of bridges on U.S. Route 101 in Oregon
- National Register of Historic Places listings in Lincoln County, Oregon
