= Shepperd's Dell =

Small canyon in the Columbia River Gorge in Oregon, in the U.S.

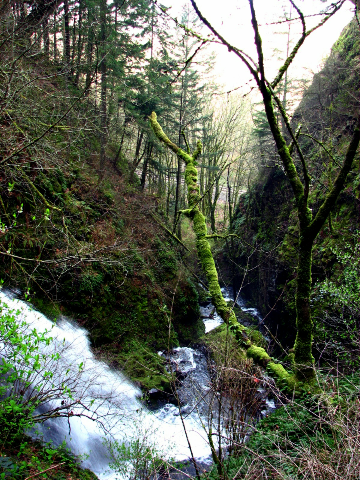
Shepperd's Dell

Shepperd's Dell is a small canyon in the Columbia River Gorge in Oregon, located at 45.54833°N 122.195°W which is less than one-third mile (500 m) southeast of Rooster Rock State Park. The Shepperd's Dell Bridge is listed on the National Register of Historic Places.

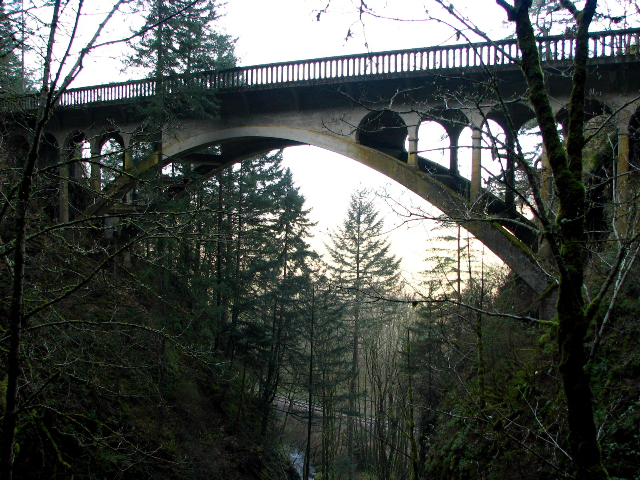
Shepperd's Dell Bridge on the Historic Columbia River Highway

The Historic Columbia River Highway runs over the dell on a bridge that was the answer to one of the engineering challenges of the highway's construction. The dell was carved by a creek that includes two fairly substantial tumbling waterfalls. Due to the topography of the area, it is difficult to photograph the falls. As such, the bridge is what is normally pictured, and thus is arguably better known than the dell itself.

The spelling of the dell's name tends to vary depending on the source. The official Oregon State Park site spells it with the apostrophe, however the GNIS entry omits the apostrophe. Oregon Geographic Names appears to make a distinction between the name of the geographic feature and the name of the state park (now a state natural area), referring to both Shepperds Dell and Shepperd's Dell State Park. Omitting the apostrophe when referring to the dell itself is consistent with the policies of the United States Board on Geographic Names, which strongly discourages the use of possessive apostrophes in geographic names.

== Shepperd's Dell Bridge ==
The Shepperd's Dell Bridge is apparently an open spandrel concrete arch bridge. It is a contributing structure in the Columbia River Highway Historic District which was listed on the National Register in 1983.

== See also ==
- List of bridges documented by the Historic American Engineering Record in Oregon
