= Umpqua River Bridge =

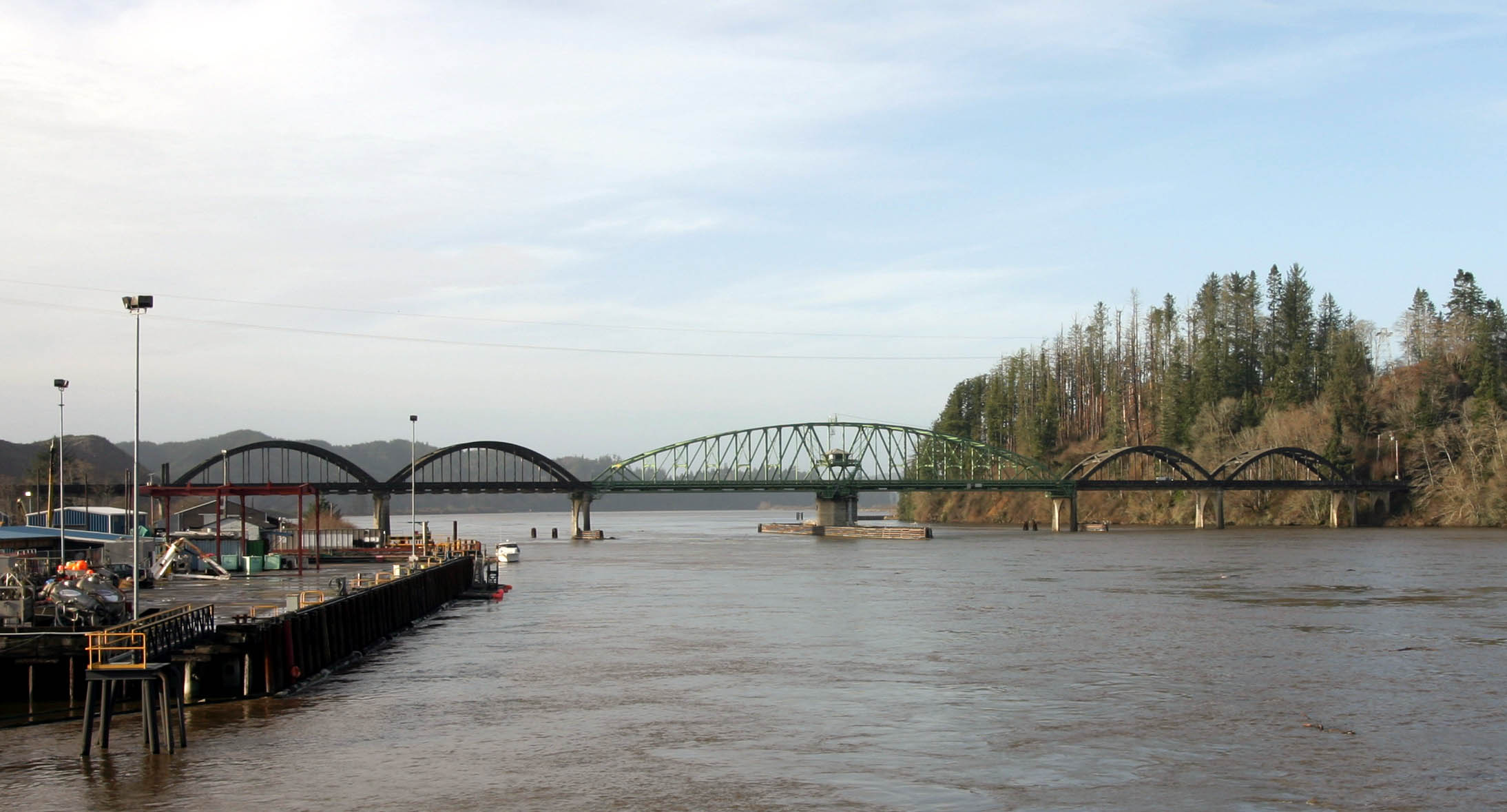
- Coordinates: 43°42′36″N 124°06′03″W
- Carries: US 101
- Crosses: Umpqua River
- Locale: Reedsport, Oregon

Characteristics
- Design: Swing bridge
- Material: Steel

History
- Designer: Conde B. McCullough
- Construction start: 1934
- Opened: 1936
- Umpqua River Bridge No. 01822
- U.S. National Register of Historic Places
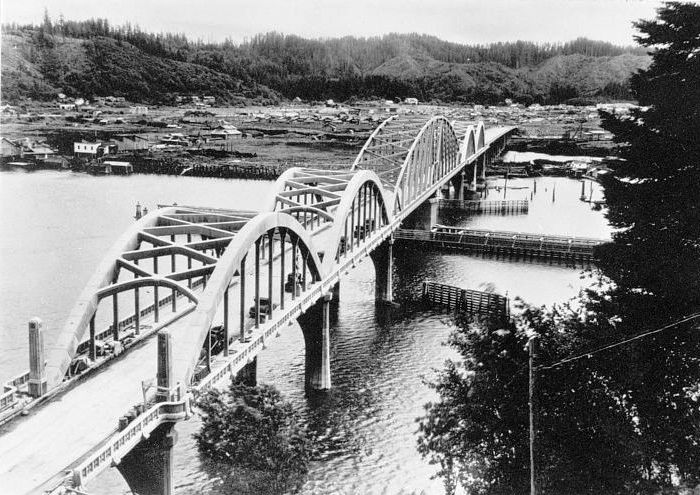
- The bridge in 1939
- Location: Reedsport, Oregon
- Built: 1934–1936
- MPS: McCullough, C. B., Major Oregon Coast Highway Bridges, 1927–1936
- NRHP reference No.: 05000815
- Added to NRHP: August 5, 2005

Location
- Interactive map of Umpqua River Bridge

The Umpqua River Bridge is a swing-span bridge that spans the Umpqua River in Reedsport, Oregon. It consists of a central swing span flanked by two reinforced concrete arches on each end. The swing span was necessary to accommodate tall sailing vessels which were common on the Umpqua River. The final cost of the bridge was $510,500.

Located at milepoint 211.11 on U.S. Route 101, this bridge is the only remaining swing-span bridge on the Oregon state highway system. This bridge was one of the many bridge projects of Conde McCullough, Oregon's Master Bridge Designer and Builder. It opened to traffic on July 3, 1936.

The north end of the bridge is within Bolon Island Tideways State Scenic Corridor; the south is within Reedsport city limits. The bridge was added to the National Register of Historic Places on August 5, 2005.

No dedication ceremony occurred at the time due to the unavailability of President Franklin Roosevelt. The ceremony was postponed indefinitely. At 3pm on September 8, 2011, the bridge was opened and closed, followed by a ribbon cutting, and cars from the 1910s, 1920s, and 1930s crossed the bridge. It was finally officially dedicated to celebrate its 75th anniversary.

== Gallery ==
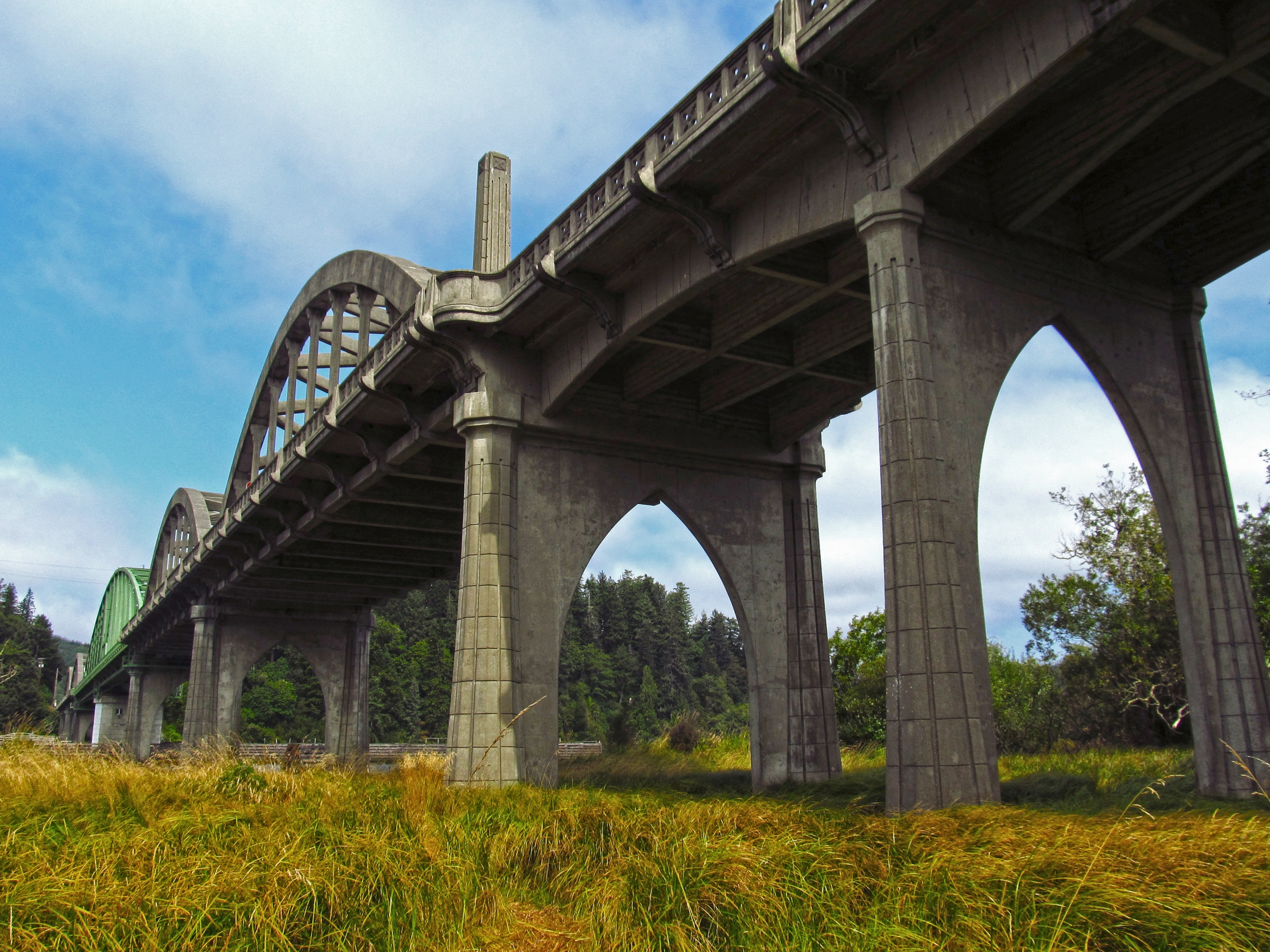

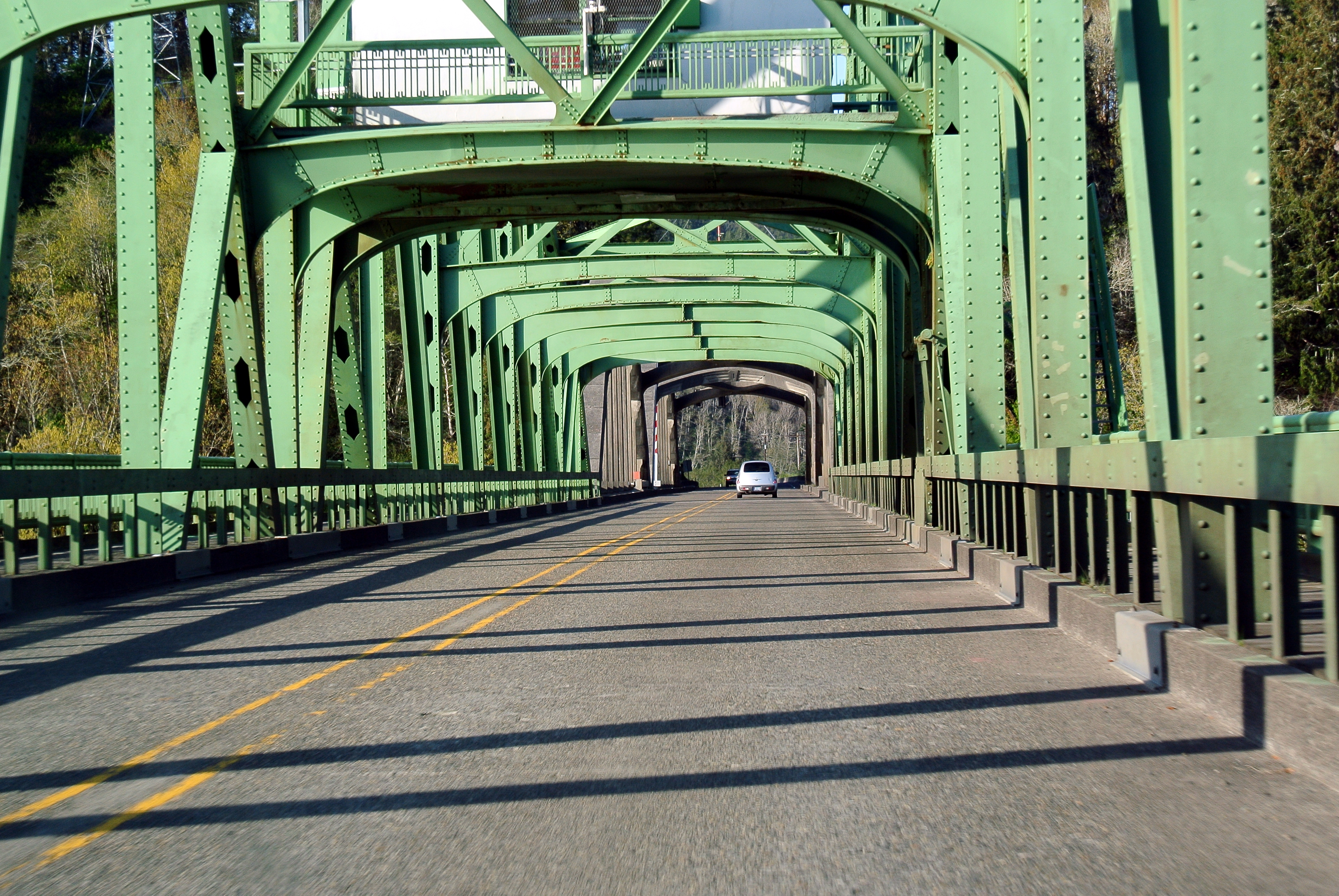
Umpqua River Bridge seen towards north

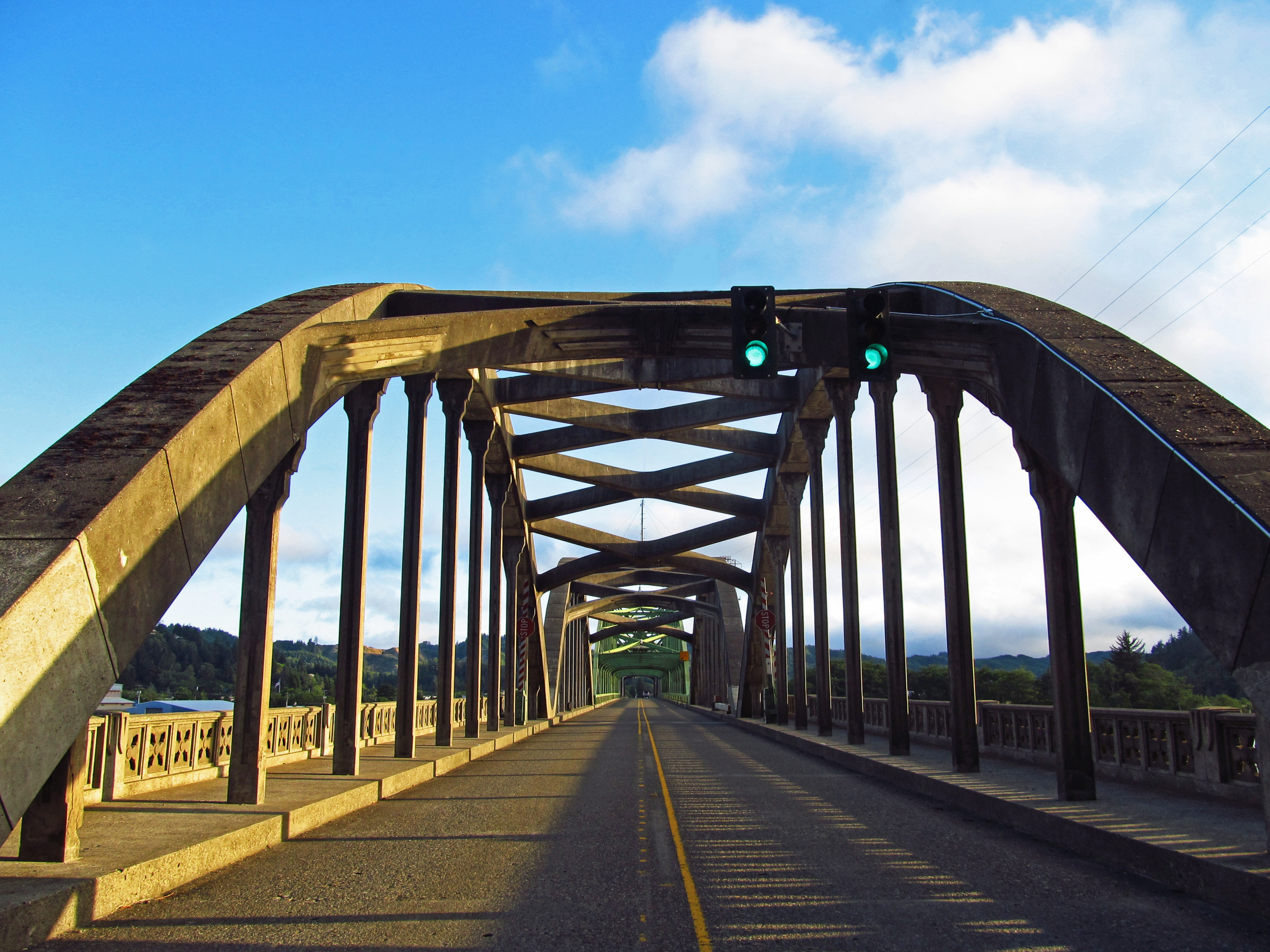

== See also ==
- List of bridges documented by the Historic American Engineering Record in Oregon
- List of bridges on the National Register of Historic Places in Oregon
- List of bridges on U.S. Route 101 in Oregon
