= Depoe Bay Whale Watching Center =

Tourist attraction in Oregon, USA

Whale Watching Center
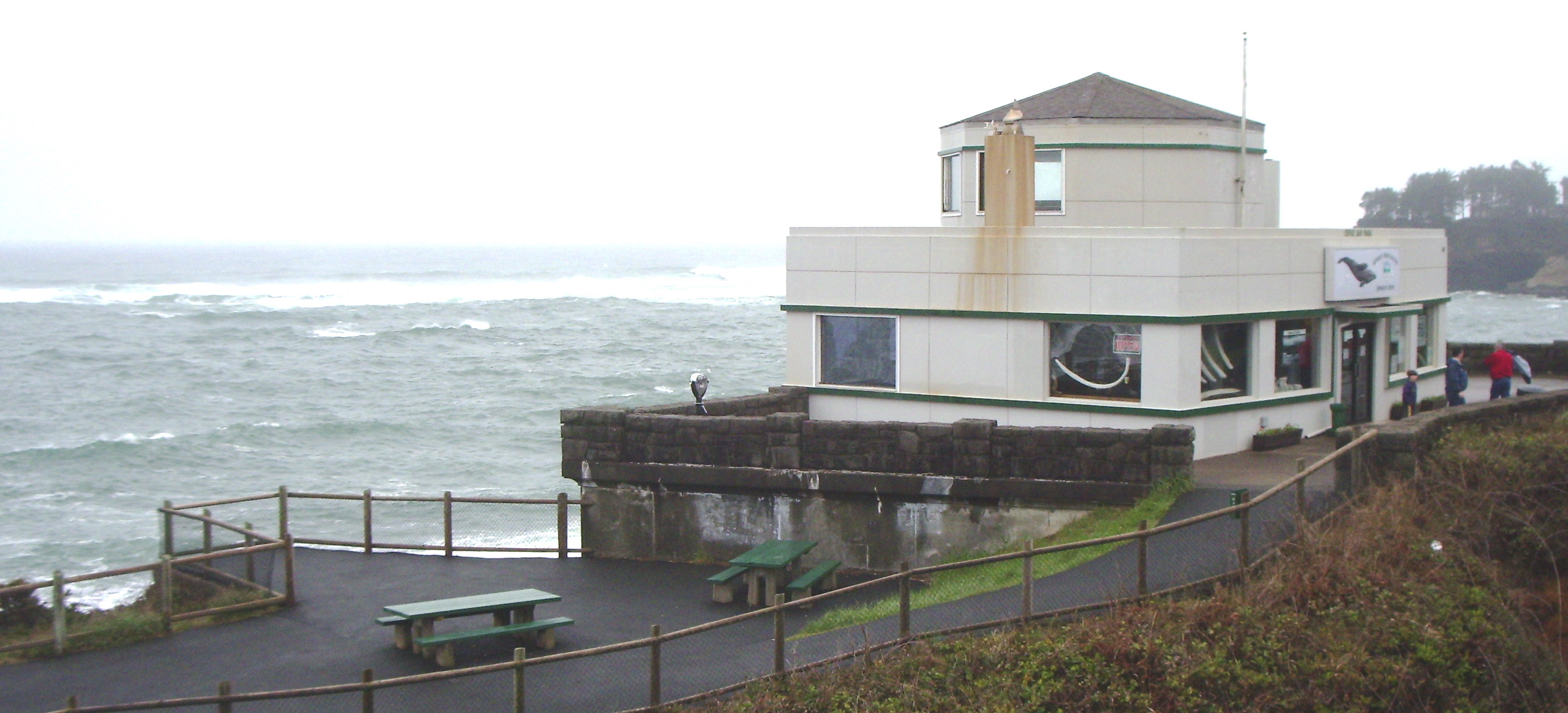
- The center overlooks the Pacific Ocean, where over 2,500 whales are seen yearly
- Interactive map of Whale Watching Center
- Type: public, state
- Location: Lincoln County, Oregon, United States
- Coordinates: 44.810142°N 124.06236°W
- Area: <2000 sq ft plus outdoor viewing area
- Created: November 2004
- Operator: Oregon Parks and Recreation Department
- Visitors: 100,000
- Status: open every day during summer (also winter break and spring break); Wednesday through Sunday during autumn, winter, and spring
- Depoe Bay Ocean Wayside
- U.S. National Register of Historic Places
- Location within Oregon Location within the United States
- Location: OR Coast 9, US101, MO127.61, Depoe Bay, Oregon
- Built: 1956
- Built by: John Helstrom
- Architect: Carl Schneider (Oregon Highway Department)
- Landscape architect: Harold Spooner
- Architectural style: International style
- NRHP reference No.: 12000082
- Added to NRHP: March 17, 2012

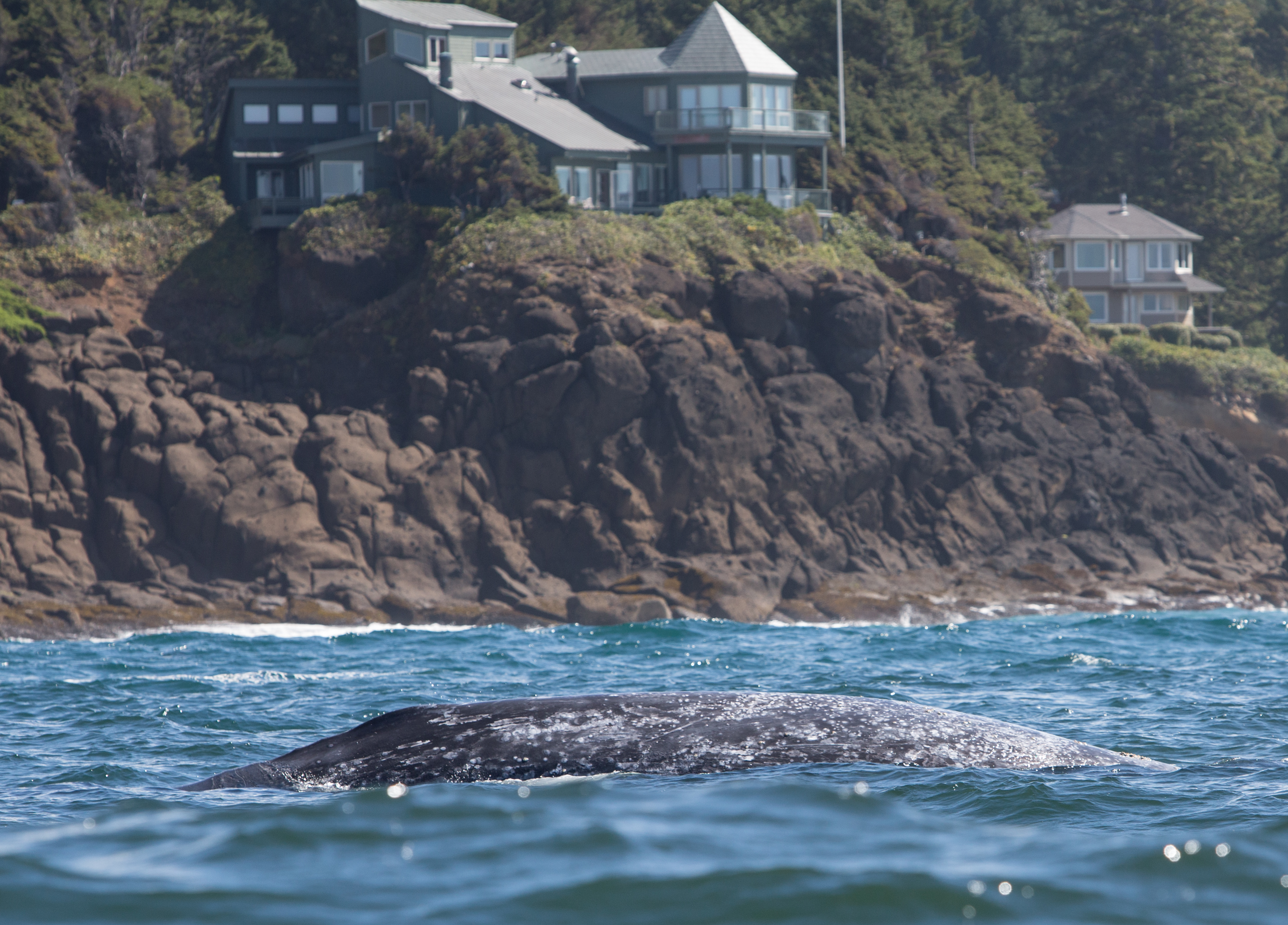
Gray whale & houses, Depoe Bay, September 2015

The Depoe Bay Whale Watching Center, also known as the Depoe Bay Ocean Wayside, is an Oregon State Parks-staffed visitor center in Depoe Bay, Oregon, U.S. to help visitors observe whale migration and provide information about whales and other marine mammals, including history, economics, and their environmental and ecological influences. The wayside provides a sheltered platform from which to view the ocean. First established as a wayside parking area on the Oregon Coast Highway in 1930, the wayside building was built in 1956 as a restroom facility for the popular spot. It is located just to the north of the Depoe Bay Bridge, also on the National Register.

== Description ==
The 1½-story concrete building stands directly on the rocky coast at a slightly lower level than the highway, directly adjacent to the entrance to Depoe Bay. The main level consists of a single room used as a display and concession area, with a stairway to the lower level, where the toilets are located. The main room has large windows facing the ocean. A stair in the center of the space leads up to an octagonal observation room in the middle of the roof terrace, with five windows facing the ocean. The roof supports an open-air observation deck.

The structure is surrounded by a concrete plaza that also overlooks the ocean, with a low stone-capped concrete wall surrounding the area. A promenade runs northwards from the wayside along the shoreline, shielded by a stone wall that served as the prototype for the decorative stonework at the wayside's plaza. The observatory building's appearance is essentially the same as its 1950s appearance.

== History ==
The Depoe Bay Ocean Wayside was built after residents of Depoe Bay implored the Oregon State Highway Department for a restroom facility at the popular location. Conceptual designs were developed by landscape architect Harold Spooner, with four designs: an entirely unobtrusive structure below road level, a low flat-roofed building, a flat-roofed building with a prominent lighthouse-like tower, and a flat-roofed structure (labeled "Cliff House") with an octagonal cupola. The last alternate was chosen, with alterations to incorporate interior stairways and an overall lowering of grade to avoid blocking the view from the highway. Spooner's concept was developed by Oregon Highway Department Carl Schneider. The wayside was completed in June 1956. The main level has been occupied by a series of concessionaires, a condition imposed by the state, concerned that the property be self-supporting. It has been described as a smaller version of Vista House at Crown Point on the Columbia River, and serves a similar purpose.

The Depoe Bay wayside was operated by the Oregon Department of Transportation until 1988, when it was transferred to Depoe Bay. In 2008 it was again transferred to the Oregon Parks and Recreation Department. It has been used as a lookout for watching gray whales since 2005.

== Whale watching ==
Approximately 20,000 whales migrate southward past the center from mid-December to end of January each year. The same number migrate northward, but are distributed throughout mid-March through the first week of June. Gray whales are the most commonly sighted whales year round along the Oregon Coast. Prime viewing is during the migration seasons of December through January, and March through June. July will bring summer feeding whales with peak viewing August through October. Summer is when the whales are the closest to shore making them easier to watch. Other types of whales observed are humpbacks, minkes, orca, and sometimes sperm and blue whale. There are approximately 2500 unique whale individuals observed from the center each year.

The center is free to enter, has binoculars for public use, and is out of the weather.

Winter migration brings the highest concentration of whales, with 20,000 passing Oregon from the last week of December through the first week of February, but winter also brings stormy conditions. Good viewing conditions make it possible to see up to thirty whales an hour but winter weather can make observation difficult, and the rough seas usually cause the whales to travel farther from shore.

Spring migration brings the whales closer to shore, from a 1/2 mile (0.8 km) to 3 miles (5 km) out, and it also brings better viewing weather. The whales are less concentrated as juveniles, adults and mother/baby pairs travel at different times. The last week of March is usually the beginning of the migration past Oregon and continues through the first week of June. Mothers and calves are the slowest moving and usually observed passing Oregon during the month of May.

Whales sometimes spend the summer here instead of traveling to the Alaskan feed grounds. They feed on the clouds of crustaceans (Mysidacea) which hover around the kelp beds. Summer whales feed very close to shore with the best viewing during August through October.

== Designation ==
The Depoe Bay Ocean Wayside was placed on the National Register of Historic Places on March 17, 2012.

== See also ==
- List of Oregon State Parks
