= Schooner Creek =

Stream in Brown County, Indiana, U.S.

Coordinates: 39°09′29″N 86°20′11″W

Schooner Creek is a stream in Brown County, Indiana, in the United States.

The stream consists of two sections: Upper Schooner Creek and Lower Schooner Creek. The river system was named for a German pioneer settler named Schoonover.

== See also ==
- List of rivers of Indiana
