= Conde McCullough =

American architect

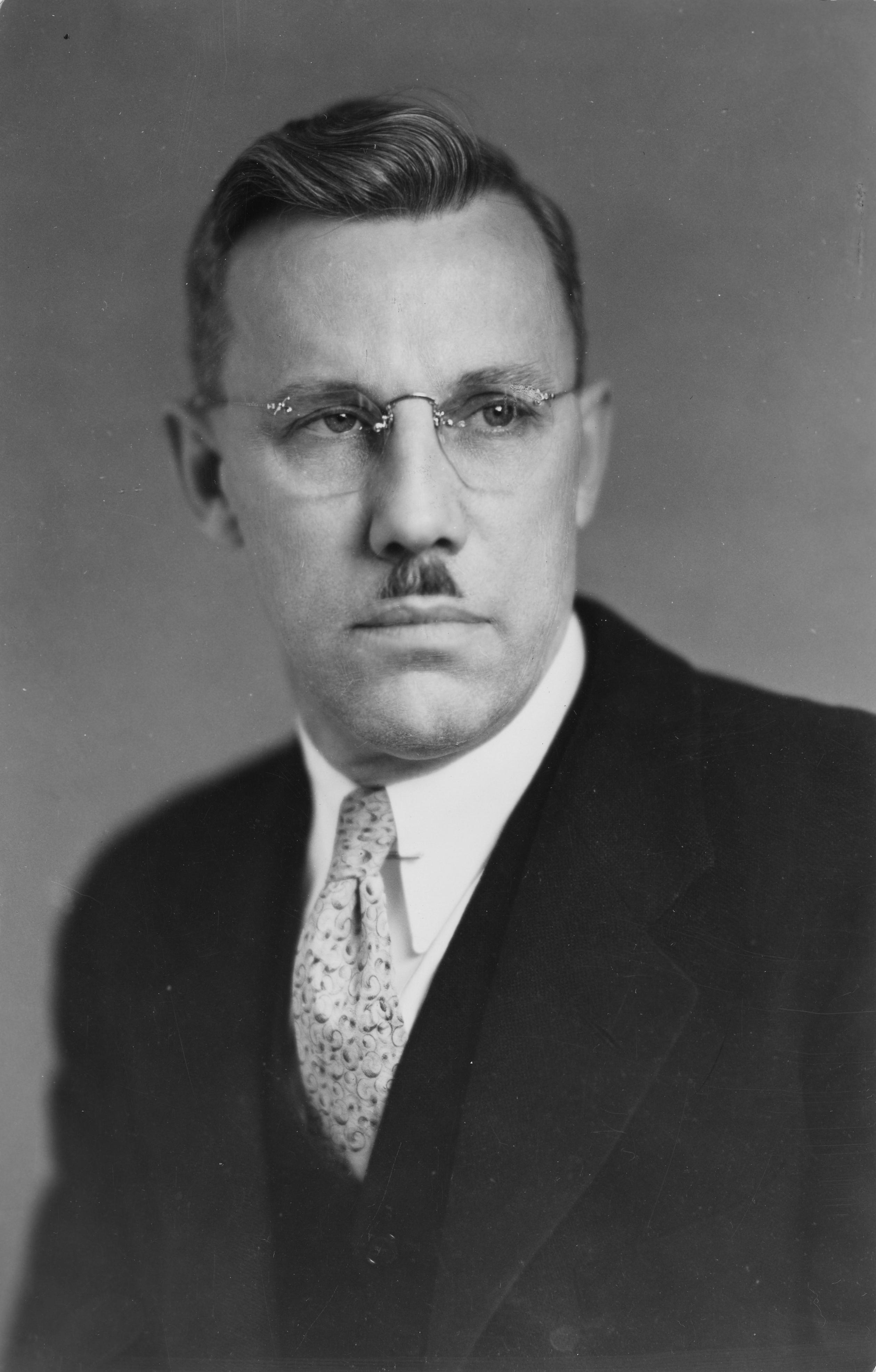
- Conde B. McCullough
- Born: May 30, 1887; Redfield, South Dakota, U.S.
- Died: May 6, 1946 (aged 58); Salem, Oregon, U.S.
- Engineering career
- Projects: Crooked River High Bridge; Isaac Lee Patterson Bridge; Conde McCullough Memorial Bridge; Umpqua River Bridge; Siuslaw River Bridge; Original Alsea Bay Bridge; Cape Creek Bridge; Big Creek Bridge; Ten Mile Creek Bridge; Depoe Bay Bridge; Yaquina Bay Bridge

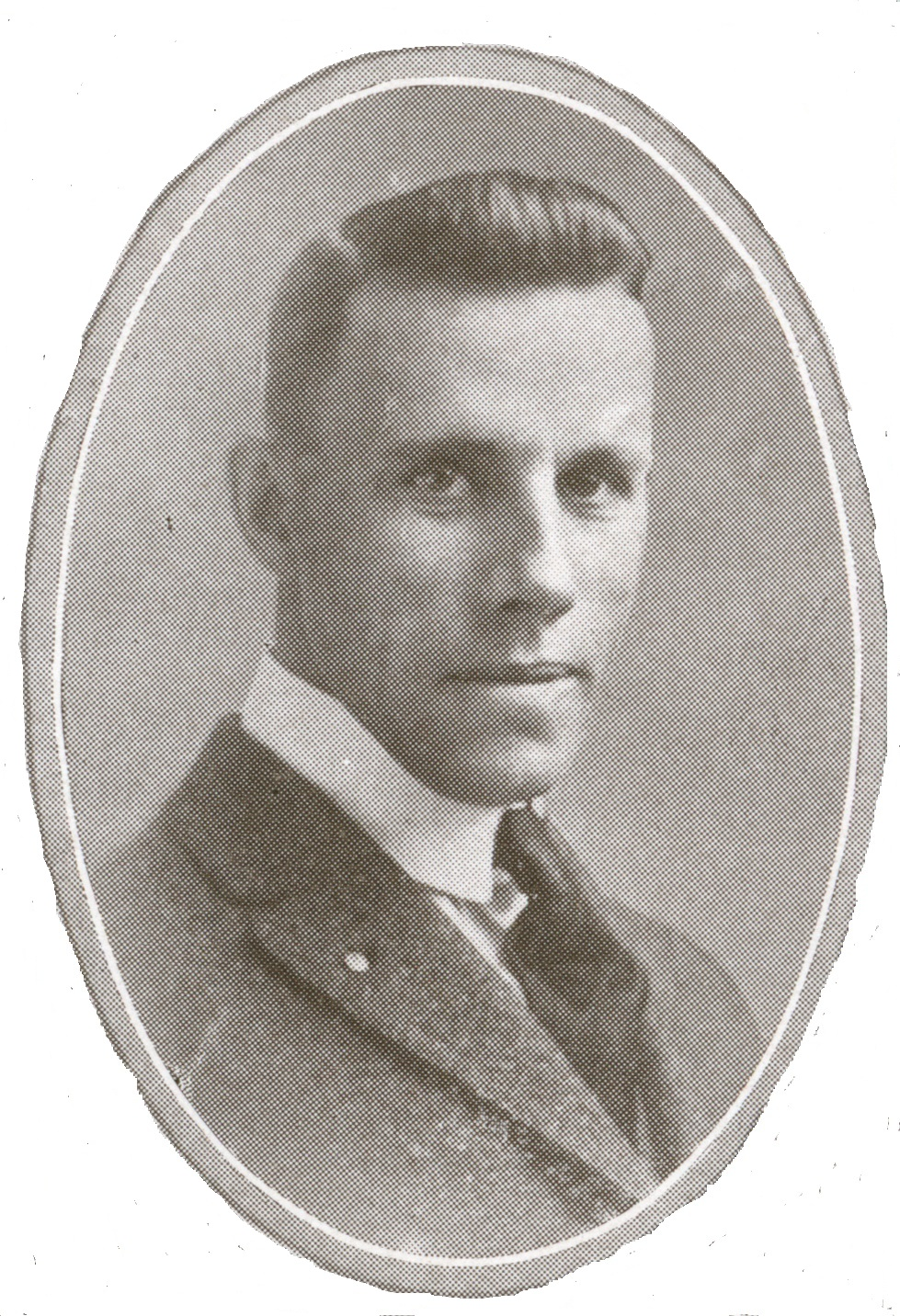
McCullough in 1922

Conde Balcom McCullough (May 30, 1887 – May 6, 1946) was an American civil engineer who is primarily known for designing many of Oregon's coastal bridges on U.S. Route 101. The native of South Dakota worked for the Oregon Department of Transportation from 1919 to 1935 and 1937 until he died in 1946. McCullough also was a professor at Oregon State University.

== Early life ==
Conde McCullough was born in Redfield, South Dakota, on May 30, 1887. In 1891, he and his family moved to Iowa, where his father died in 1904. McCullough then worked at various jobs to support the family. In 1910, he graduated from Iowa State University with a civil engineering degree.

== Career ==
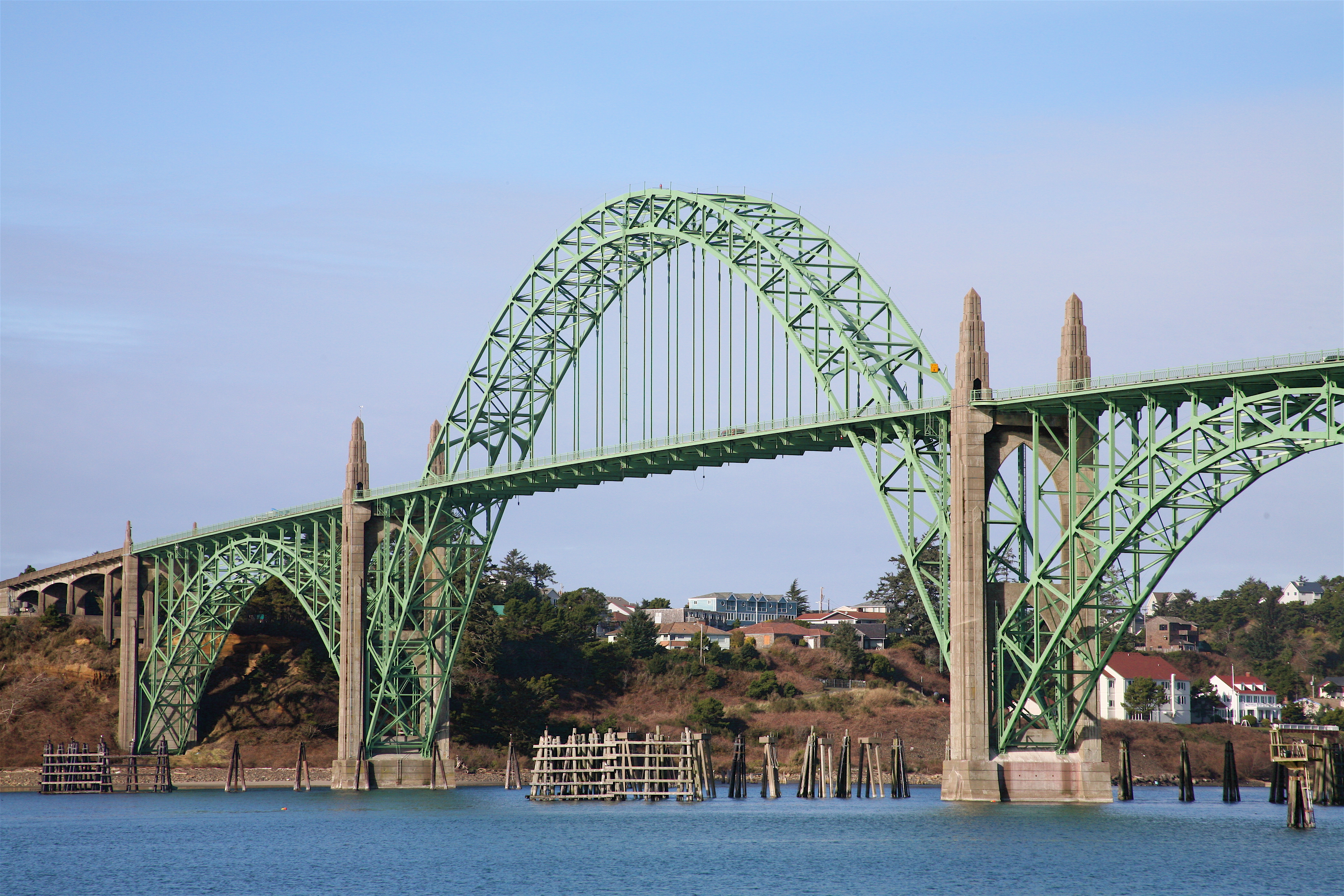
Yaquina Bay Bridge (1936)

McCullough began working for the Marsh Bridge Company in Des Moines, Iowa, where he remained for one year. He then went to work for the Iowa State Highway Commission. He moved to Oregon in 1916 and became an assistant professor of civil engineering at Oregon Agricultural College, and the sole structural engineering professor at the school. In 1919, he became the head of the Bridge Division of the Oregon Department of Transportation, making him personally responsible for the design of Oregon's bridges at a time when the state was completing Highway 101. His first bridge ODT was the bridge in the town called Rock Point 1919. Concrete pillars are still visible on both sides of the Rogue River.

His designs are well known for their architectural beauty. McCullough advocated that bridges be built economically, efficiently, and with beauty. He helped design over 600 bridges, many with architectural details such as Gothic spires, art deco obelisks, and Romanesque arches incorporated into the bridges. In 1928, he graduated from Willamette University College of Law and passed the bar the same year. In 1935, he moved to San José, Costa Rica, to help design bridges on the Pan-American Highway. He returned to Oregon in 1937 to become the assistant state highway engineer.

== Later life and legacy ==
In 1934, McCullough was granted an honorary doctorate from Oregon State University. He published The Engineer at Law with his son John McCullough who also was an attorney. McCullough died of a stroke at his home in Salem, Oregon, on May 6, 1946. He was close to his 59th birthday. He was interred in the Mount Crest Abbey Mausoleum at City View Cemetery in Salem. His wife Marie was interred there after her death in 1954. Following McCullough's death, the state of Oregon renamed the North Bend Bridge in his honor.

== Works ==
| Bridge name | Location | Year completed | Total length | Carries |
|---|---|---|---|---|
| Old Youngs Bay Bridge | Astoria, Oregon | 1921 | 1,766.2 feet (538.3 m) | U.S. Route 101 |
| Oregon City Bridge | Oregon City, Oregon | 1922 | 745 feet (227 m) | Oregon Route 43 |
| Dry Canyon Creek Bridge | near Rowena, Oregon | 1922 | 101.1 ft | U.S. Route 30 |
| Myrtle Creek Bridge | Myrtle Creek, Oregon | 1922 | 597.1 ft | Old Highway 99 |
| Winchester Bridge | Winchester, Oregon | 1923 | 884 feet | Oregon Route 99 |
| Lewis and Clark River Bridge | Astoria, Oregon | 1924 | 828 feet | U.S. Route 101 |
| Upper Perry Arch Bridge | Perry, Oregon | 1924 | 134 feet (41 m) | Old U.S. 30 off I-84 |
| Ellsworth Street Bridge | Albany, Oregon | 1925 | 1,090 feet | U.S. Route 20 |
| Crooked River High Bridge | Jefferson County, Oregon | 1926 | 464 feet | U.S. Route 97 |
| Rocky Creek Bridge | Lincoln County, Oregon | 1927 | 360 feet | U.S. Route 101 |
| Depoe Bay Bridge | Depoe Bay, Oregon | 1927 | 312 feet | U.S. Route 101 |
| Big Creek Bridge | Lane County, Oregon | 1931 | 180 feet | U.S. Route 101 |
| Ten Mile Creek Bridge | near Yachats, Oregon | 1931 | 180 feet | U.S. Route 101 |
| Wilson River Bridge | Tillamook County, Oregon | 1931 | 180 feet | U.S. Route 101 |
| Sixth Street (Caveman) Bridge | Grants Pass, Oregon | 1931 | 550 feet | Oregon Route 99 |
| Cape Creek Bridge | near Heceta Head | 1932 | 619 feet (188.6 m) | U.S. Route 101 |
| Isaac Lee Patterson Bridge | Gold Beach, Oregon | 1932 | 1,898 feet (578.5 m) | U.S. Route 101 |
| John McLoughlin Bridge | Oregon City, Oregon | 1933 | 720 feet | Oregon Route 99E |
| Umpqua River Bridge | Reedsport, Oregon | 1936 | 2,206 feet | U.S. Route 101 |
| Siuslaw River Bridge | Florence, Oregon | 1936 | 1,568 feet | U.S. Route 101 |
| Original Alsea Bay Bridge | Waldport, Oregon | 1936 | 3,028 feet | U.S. Route 101 |
| Yaquina Bay Bridge | Newport, Oregon | 1936 | 3,223 feet (982 m) | U.S. Route 101 |
| Conde McCullough Memorial Bridge | North Bend, Oregon | 1936 | 5,305 feet (1.6 km) | U.S. Route 101 |

== See also ==
- Samuel Hill
- Glenn Jackson
- Robert Moses
