= Tenmile Creek (Lane County, Oregon) =

- Location of the mouth of Tenmile Creek in Oregon

Location
- Country: United States
- State: Oregon
- County: Lane

Physical characteristics
- Source: Oregon Coast Range
  - location: Siuslaw National Forest
  - coordinates: 44°12′24″N 123°55′38″W
  - elevation: 1,233 ft (376 m)
- Mouth: Pacific Ocean
  - location: Stonefield Beach State Recreation Site
  - coordinates: 44°13′31″N 124°06′39″W
  - elevation: 10 ft (3.0 m)
- Length: 10 km (6.2 mi)

Tenmile Creek is a stream in Lane County, in the U.S. state of Oregon. It flows west from the Siuslaw National Forest in the Oregon Coast Range into the Pacific Ocean at Stonefield Beach State Recreation Site, about 6 miles (10 km) south of Yachats.

Tenmile Creek was named for its length, approximately 10 miles (16 km). Tenmile Ridge, which runs parallel to and north of the stream, is named for the creek.

Tenmile Creek Bridge carries U.S. Highway 101 over the creek. Bridge engineer Conde B. McCullough designed the 180-foot (55 m)-long structure in 1931.

Ten Mile County Park, operated by Lane County, is along the stream. Amenities include toilets and four tent sites, with access to fishing and hunting. The park is about 4 miles (6 km) upstream of Highway 101 along Forest Service Road 56.

Named tributaries from source to mouth are Wildcat Creek, which enters from the right; South Fork from the left; McKinney Creek from the right, and Mill Creek from the left.

== See also ==
- List of rivers of Oregon
