= Ten Mile Creek Bridge (Oregon) =

- Ten Mile Creek Bridge No. 01181
- U.S. National Register of Historic Places
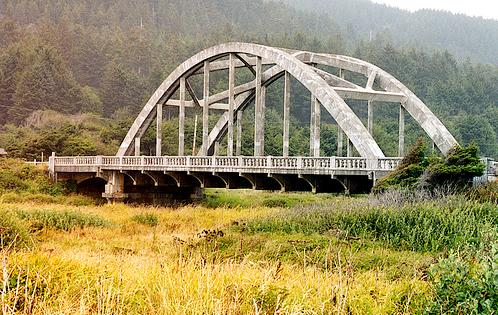

- Location within Oregon Location within the United States
- Nearest city: US 101 – Yachats
- Coordinates: 44.22410°N 124.10959°W
- Built: 1931
- Architect: Conde B. McCullough, Union Bridge Company
- Architectural style: Classical Revival, Art Deco
- MPS: C. B. McCullough Major Oregon Coast Highway Bridges MPS
- NRHP reference No.: 05000818
- Added to NRHP: August 5, 2005

Ten Mile Creek Bridge (No. 01181) is a Conde McCullough-designed bridge near Yachats in Lane County in the U.S. state of Oregon. It was listed on the National Register of Historic Places in 2005.

The bridge carries U.S. Route 101 over Tenmile Creek. McCullough designed the structure in 1931. Built of reinforced concrete through a tied arch, the total length of the bridge is 180 feet (55 m) with a main span of 120 feet (37 m). Ornate precast concrete railings run along the sides.

== See also ==
- List of bridges documented by the Historic American Engineering Record in Oregon
- List of bridges on the National Register of Historic Places in Oregon
- List of bridges on U.S. Route 101 in Oregon
