= Depoe Bay Bridge =

- Depoe Bay Bridge No. 01388
- U.S. National Register of Historic Places
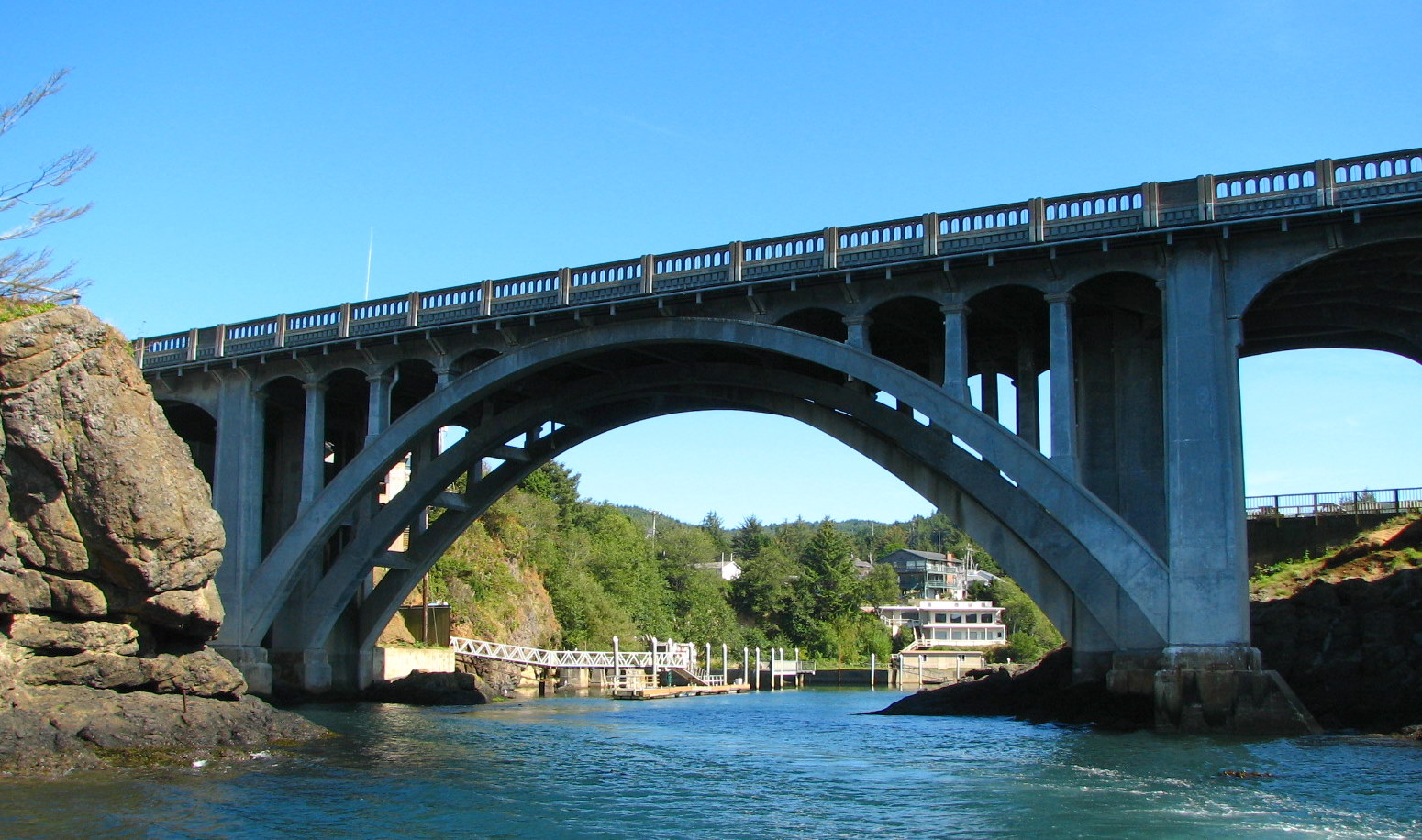
- Depoe Bay Bridge from the sea side

- Location within Oregon Location within the United States
- Location: OR Coast 9, US101, MO127.61, Depoe Bay, Oregon
- Coordinates: 44°48′35″N 124°03′43″W
- Area: 0.4 acres (0.16 ha)
- Built: 1927
- Architect: Conde McCullough
- Architectural style: Classical Revival
- MPS: C. B. McCullough Major Oregon Coast Highway Bridges MPS
- NRHP reference No.: 05000823
- Added to NRHP: August 5, 2005

The Depoe Bay Bridge is one of a series of significant bridges along the Oregon Coast Highway. The concrete arch bridge spans the mouth of Depoe Bay at milepost 127.61 with a 150-foot (46 m) main span, and a total length of 312 feet (95 m). The bridge's designer was Conde McCullough who designed all of the 1920s bridges on the highway. The original bridge, completed in 1927, was only 18 feet (5.5 m) wide from curb to curb with no sidewalks, and was widened in 1940 with a similar arched concrete bridge immediately adjacent to the original. The added structure is sympathetic to the original and is included in the National Register of Historic Places listing.

== Description ==
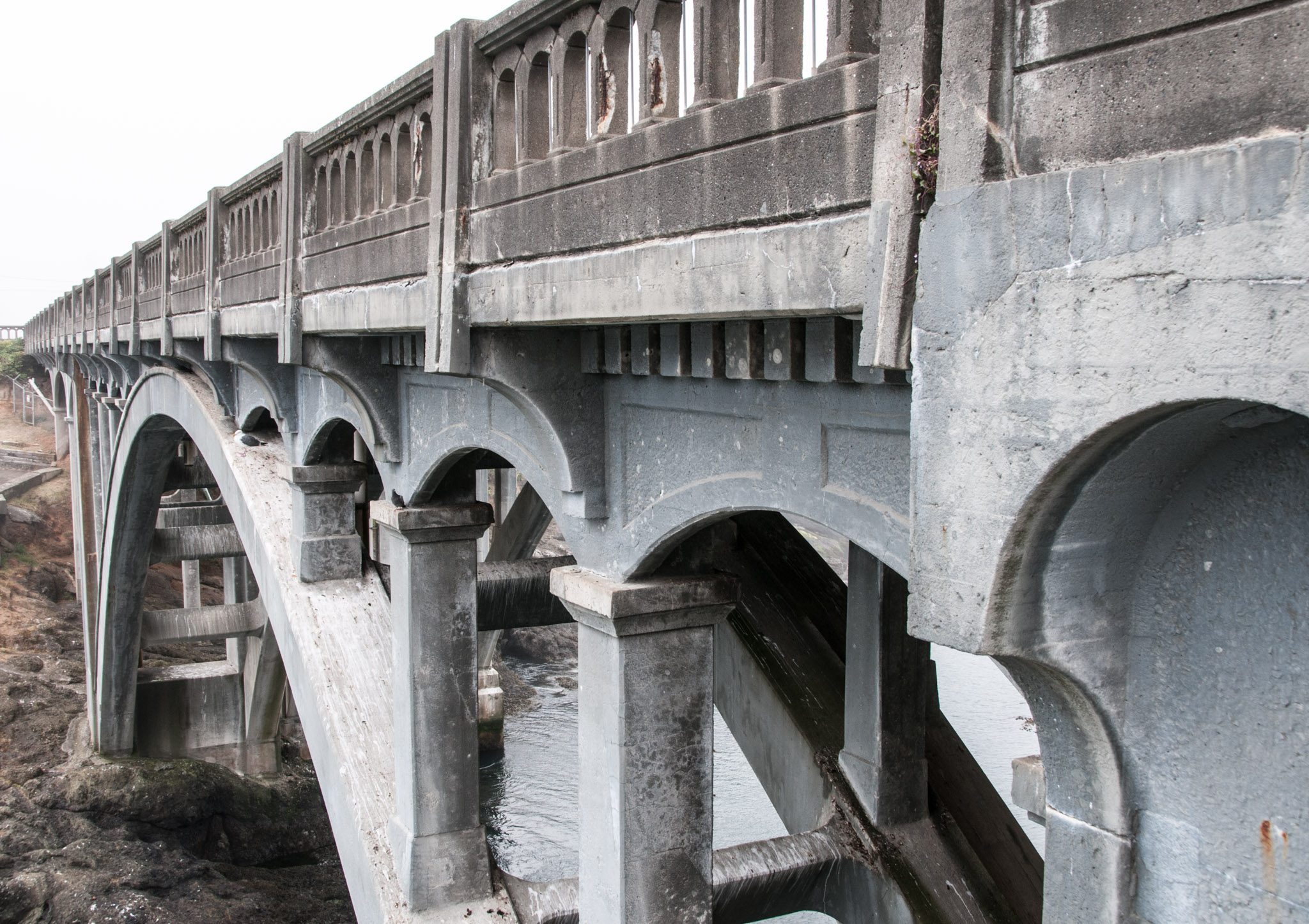
Depoe Bay Bridge

The bridge spans the narrow outlet of Depoe Bay with one long arch and three arched girders on one approach side, with a smaller arched girder on the other side. The bridge was built by the Kuckenberg-Wittman Company for $55,000. The deck features a decorative arched railing with details in the Art Moderne style popular at the time. The 1940 bridge joins the original bridge to create a 48-foot-wide (15 m) roadway with 5-foot (1.5 m) sidewalks on either side. The new span was built by the Odom Construction Company and incorporates stairs and a walkway under the bridge for access to the Depoe Bay Whale Watching Center.

The Depoe Bay Bridge was placed on the National Register of Historic Places on August 5, 2005.

== See also ==
- List of bridges documented by the Historic American Engineering Record in Oregon
- List of bridges on the National Register of Historic Places in Oregon
- National Register of Historic Places listings in Lincoln County, Oregon
