= Depoe Bay, Oregon =

- City
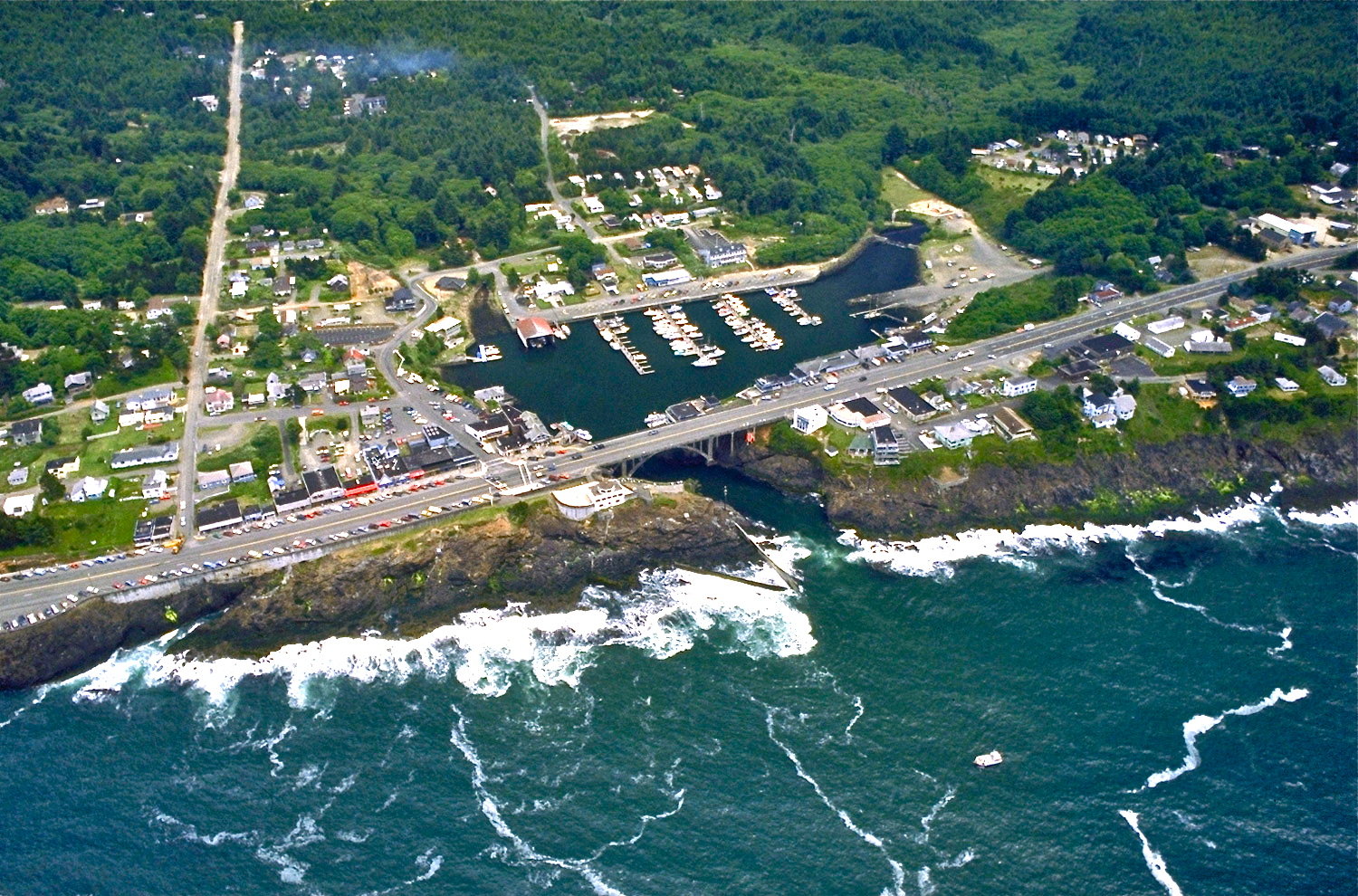
- Aerial view of the harbor and center of Depoe Bay
- Nickname: The World's Smallest Harbor
- Location in Oregon

- Location in the United States
- Coordinates: 44°48′26″N 124°3′44″W
- Country: United States
- State: Oregon
- County: Lincoln
- Incorporated: 1973

Government
  - Mayor: Kathy Short

Area
  - Total: 1.81 sq mi (4.69 km^{2})
  - Land: 1.81 sq mi (4.69 km^{2})
  - Water: 0 sq mi (0.00 km^{2})
- Elevation: 7 ft (2.1 m)

Population (2020)
  - Total: 1,515
  - Density: 836.4/sq mi (322.94/km^{2})
- Time zone: UTC-8 (Pacific)
  - Summer (DST): UTC-7 (Pacific)
- ZIP code: 97341
- Area code: 541
- FIPS code: 41-18850
- GNIS feature ID: 1119868
- Website: www.cityofdepoebay.org

Depoe Bay is a city in Lincoln County, Oregon, United States, located on U.S. Route 101 on the Pacific Ocean. As of the 2020 census, Depoe Bay had a population of 1,515. The bay of the same name is a 6-acre (2.4 ha) harbor that the city promotes as the world's smallest navigable harbor. (Note: Strictly speaking, Depoe Bay can only claim to be the world's smallest natural navigable harbor. For example, Seacliff in Scotland is smaller, but was built artificially.)

== History ==
Depoe Bay was named for Siletz Indian Charles "Charley" Depoe (born Ki-sa Che-wes-cla) who was originally allotted the land in 1894 as part of the Dawes Act of 1887. One says he was given the name "Depot Charley" for working at the military depot near Toledo, Oregon. The family was later known as "DePoe" after his son, Robert DePoe attended the Carlisle Indian School. His original tribal affiliation was Josua/Tututni.

On March 11, 2011, Depoe Bay's port was damaged by a tsunami caused by the Tōhoku earthquake off the coast of Japan.

On August 21, 2017, Depoe Bay became one of the first places in the United States to witness totality of the North American solar eclipse of that year.

== Geography ==
According to the United States Census Bureau, the city has a total area of 1.81 square miles (4.69 km^{2}), all of it land.

== Demographics ==
Historical population
Census	Pop.	Note	%±
1980	723		—
1990	870		20.3%
2000	1,174		34.9%
2010	1,398		19.1%
2020	1,515		8.4%
U.S. Decennial Census

=== 2020 census ===
As of the 2020 census, Depoe Bay had a population of 1,515. The median age was 60.1 years. 10.0% of residents were under the age of 18 and 39.0% of residents were 65 years of age or older. For every 100 females there were 84.1 males, and for every 100 females age 18 and over there were 83.8 males age 18 and over.

99.0% of residents lived in urban areas, while 1.0% lived in rural areas.

There were 740 households in Depoe Bay, of which 13.8% had children under the age of 18 living in them. Of all households, 50.5% were married-couple households, 15.8% were households with a male householder and no spouse or partner present, and 27.2% were households with a female householder and no spouse or partner present. About 28.7% of all households were made up of individuals and 17.3% had someone living alone who was 65 years of age or older.

There were 1,266 housing units, of which 41.5% were vacant. Among occupied housing units, 72.0% were owner-occupied and 28.0% were renter-occupied. The homeowner vacancy rate was 5.8% and the rental vacancy rate was 12.5%.

Racial composition as of the 2020 census
Race	Number	Percent
White	1,343	88.6%
Black or African American	9	0.6%
American Indian and Alaska Native	21	1.4%
Asian	18	1.2%
Native Hawaiian and Other Pacific Islander	4	0.3%
Some other race	22	1.5%
Two or more races	98	6.5%
Hispanic or Latino (of any race)	77	5.1%

=== 2010 census ===
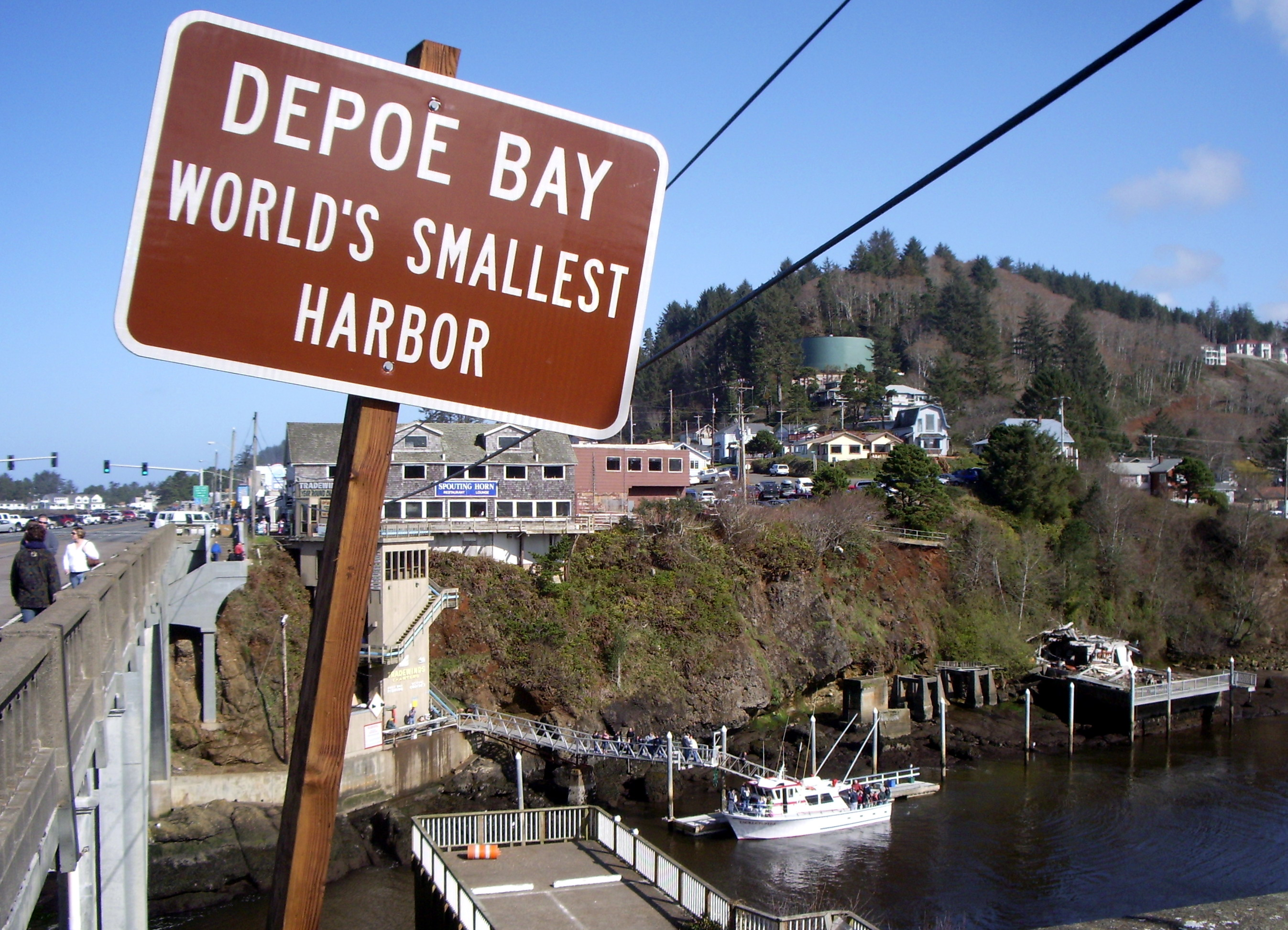
The city entrance sign over the harbor

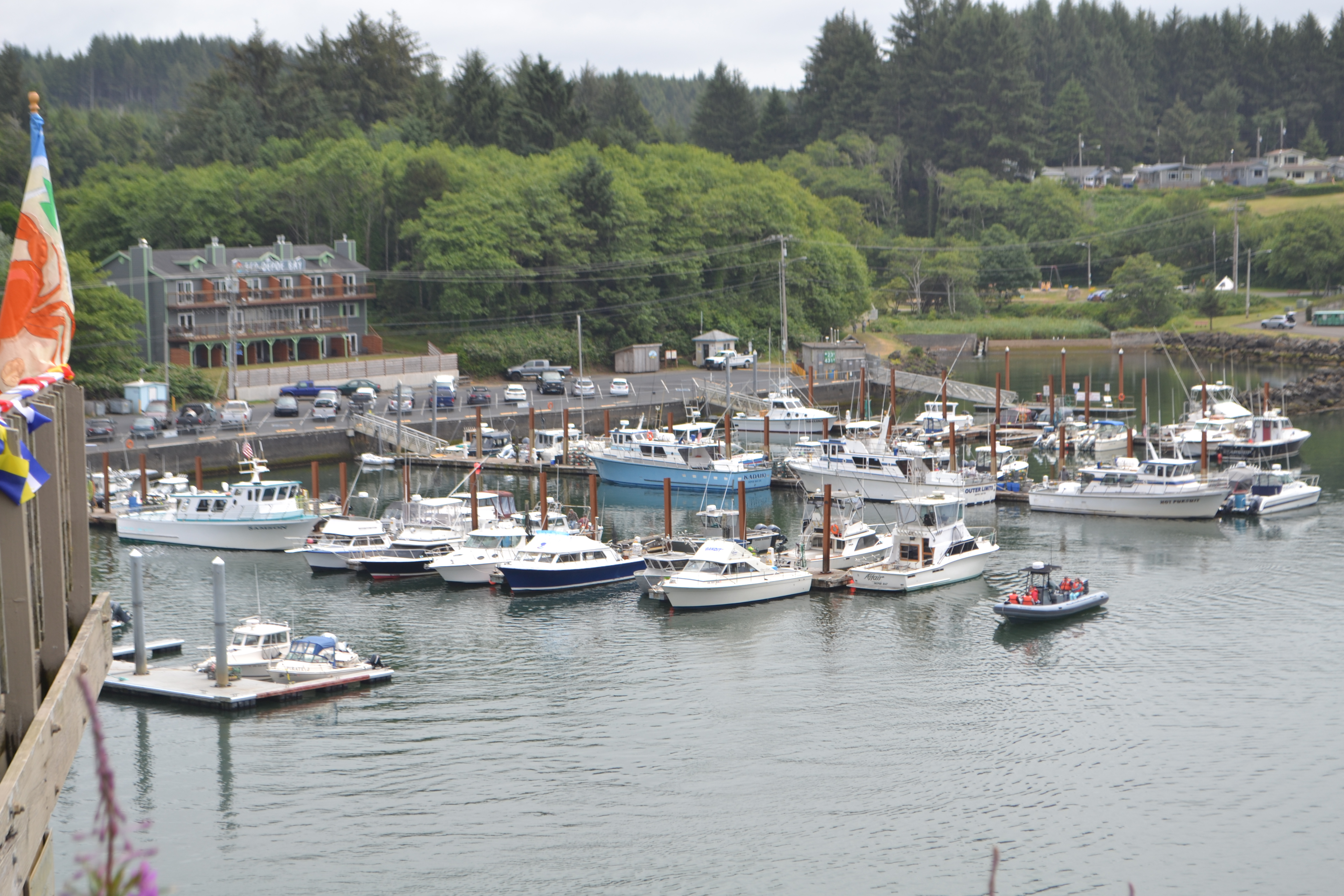
Depoe Bay

As of the census of 2010, there were 1,398 people, 714 households, and 411 families living in the city. The population density was 772.4 inhabitants per square mile (298.2/km^{2}). There were 1,158 housing units at an average density of 639.8 per square mile (247.0/km^{2}). The racial makeup of the city was 92.9% White, 1.5% Native American, 1.2% Asian, 0.2% Pacific Islander, 1.5% from other races, and 2.6% from two or more races. Hispanic or Latino of any race were 4.8% of the population.

There were 714 households, of which 10.6% had children under the age of 18 living with them, 48.7% were married couples living together, 6.0% had a female householder with no husband present, 2.8% had a male householder with no wife present, and 42.4% were non-families. 32.8% of all households were made up of individuals, and 13.3% had someone living alone who was 65 years of age or older. The average household size was 1.96 and the average family size was 2.39.

The median age in the city was 56.6 years. 9.7% of residents were under the age of 18; 5% were between the ages of 18 and 24; 16.5% were from 25 to 44; 38.9% were from 45 to 64; and 29.8% were 65 years of age or older. The gender makeup of the city was 48.1% male and 51.9% female.

=== 2000 census ===
As of the census of 2000, there were 1,174 people, 584 households, and 359 families living in the city. The population density was 652.2 inhabitants per square mile (251.8/km^{2}). There were 911 housing units at an average density of 506.1 per square mile (195.4/km^{2}). The racial makeup of the city was 92.50% White, 0.34% African American, 1.70% Native American, 0.60% Asian, 0.17% Pacific Islander, 1.02% from other races, and 3.66% from two or more races. Hispanic or Latino of any race were 3.58% of the population.

There were 584 households, out of which 17.0% had children under the age of 18 living with them, 51.4% were married couples living together, 7.0% had a female householder with no husband present, and 38.5% were non-families. 31.0% of all households were made up of individuals, and 11.3% had someone living alone who was 65 years of age or older. The average household size was 2.01 and the average family size was 2.43.

In the city, the population was spread out, with 14.4% under the age of 18, 3.9% from 18 to 24, 22.1% from 25 to 44, 35.7% from 45 to 64, and 23.9% who were 65 years of age or older. The median age was 50 years. For every 100 females, there were 99.0 males. For every 100 females age 18 and over, there were 93.6 males.

The median income for a household in the city was $35,417, and the median income for a family was $43,967. Males had a median income of $28,750 versus $25,469 for females. The per capita income for the city was $24,994. About 5.5% of families and 8.0% of the population were below the poverty line, including 15.1% of those under age 18 and 2.1% of those age 65 or over.

== Arts and culture ==
- Depoe Bay Whale Watching Center

== Media ==
Depoe Bay is served by radio station KPPT-FM, licensed to broadcast at 100.7 MHz. Owned by Agpal Broadcasting, the station specializes in classic hits.

== In popular culture ==
In 1975, the fishing trip sequence in One Flew Over the Cuckoo's Nest was filmed in Depoe Bay.

In 1983, the harbor sequence in Hysterical was filmed in Depoe Bay, with the Depoe Bay Bridge prominent in the background.

In 2008, restaurant scenes from The Burning Plain were filmed in Depoe Bay, at the Tidal Raves restaurant.

== See also ==
- Gracie's Sea Hag, seafood restaurant
- Whale Cove
