= Heceta =

Heceta may refer to:

- Bruno de Heceta, a Spanish explorer of the west coast of North America
- Heceta Beach, Oregon, an unincorporated community in the United States
- Heceta Head, a headland in Oregon, United States
- Heceta Head Light, a lighthouse on Heceta Head
- Heceta Island, an island off the coast of Alaska, United States
