= Peninsulas of Oregon =

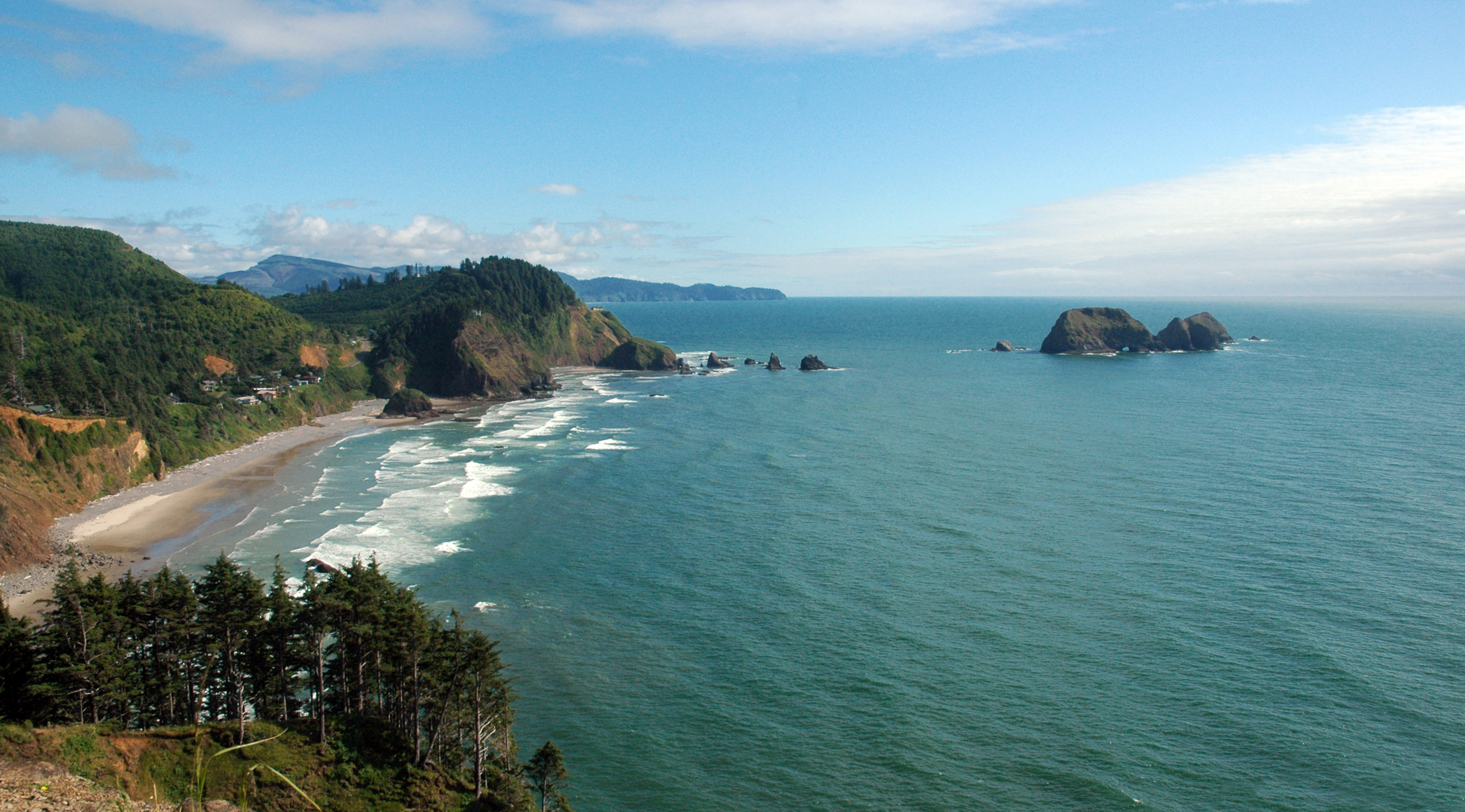
View of Cape Meares National Wildlife Refuge and Three Arch Rocks National Wildlife Refuge

Many coastal peninsulas of Oregon are properly headlands, often called capes.

== Major navigation and geographic landmarks ==
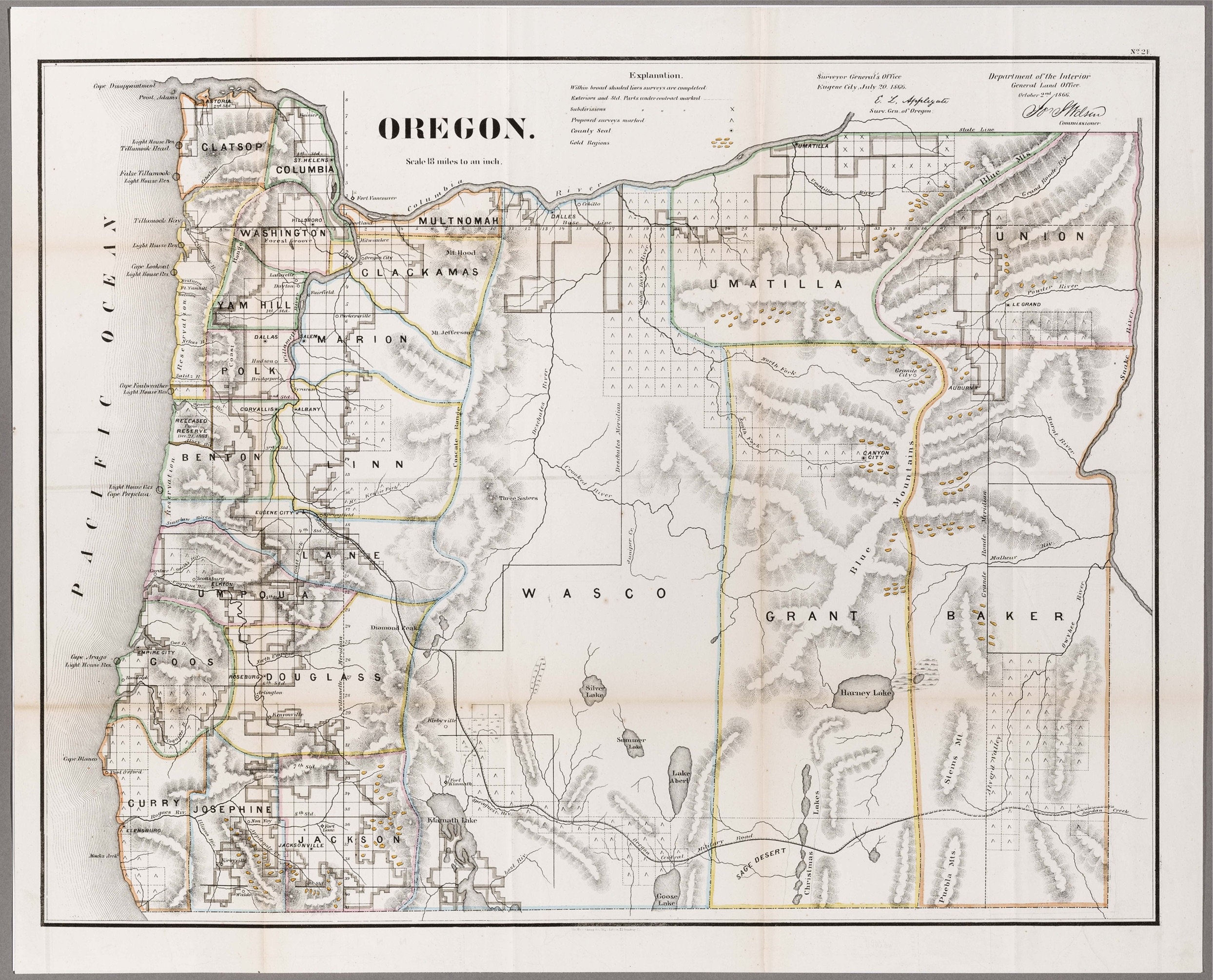
1866 United States survey from the Oregon Historical Society digital collections

Unless otherwise specified the source of the list is the Oregon maps of the Smithsonian's 1899 Indian Land Cessions of the United States. Ordered north to south:

1. Point Adams (see Point Adams Light)
2. Tillamook Head (see Tillamook Rock Lighthouse)
3. Cape Falcon (formerly known as False Tillamook, see Oswald West State Park and Cape Falcon Marine Reserve)
4. Cape Meares (see Cape Meares Lighthouse)
5. Cape Lookout
6. Cape Foulweather
7. Yaquina Head (see Yaquina Bay Lighthouse and Yaquina Head Lighthouse)
8. Cape Perpetua
9. Coos Head and Coos Bay Peninsula on Coos Bay
10. Cape Arago (see Cape Arago State Park and Cape Arago Lighthouse)
11. Cape Blanco (see Cape Blanco Lighthouse)
12. Crook Point and Mack Arch (also known as Arch Rock)

== Other headlands, promontories, rocks and stacks ==
Ordered alphabetically:

- Cape Kiwanda (see Cape Kiwanda State Natural Area)
- Cascade Head
- Haystack Rock
- The Heads
- Heceta Head (see Heceta Head Lighthouse)
- Hug Point (see Hug Point State Recreation Site)
- Mitchell Point (Oregon)
- Port Orford Heads (see Port Orford Heads State Park)

The coast of Oregon also has a number of significant sea stacks.

== See also ==
- List of lighthouses in Oregon
- Peninsulas of California
- Cape Disappointment (Washington)
