= Jewfish Point =

Geographical landmark, California, U.S.

Coordinates: 33°19′13″N 118°18′14″W

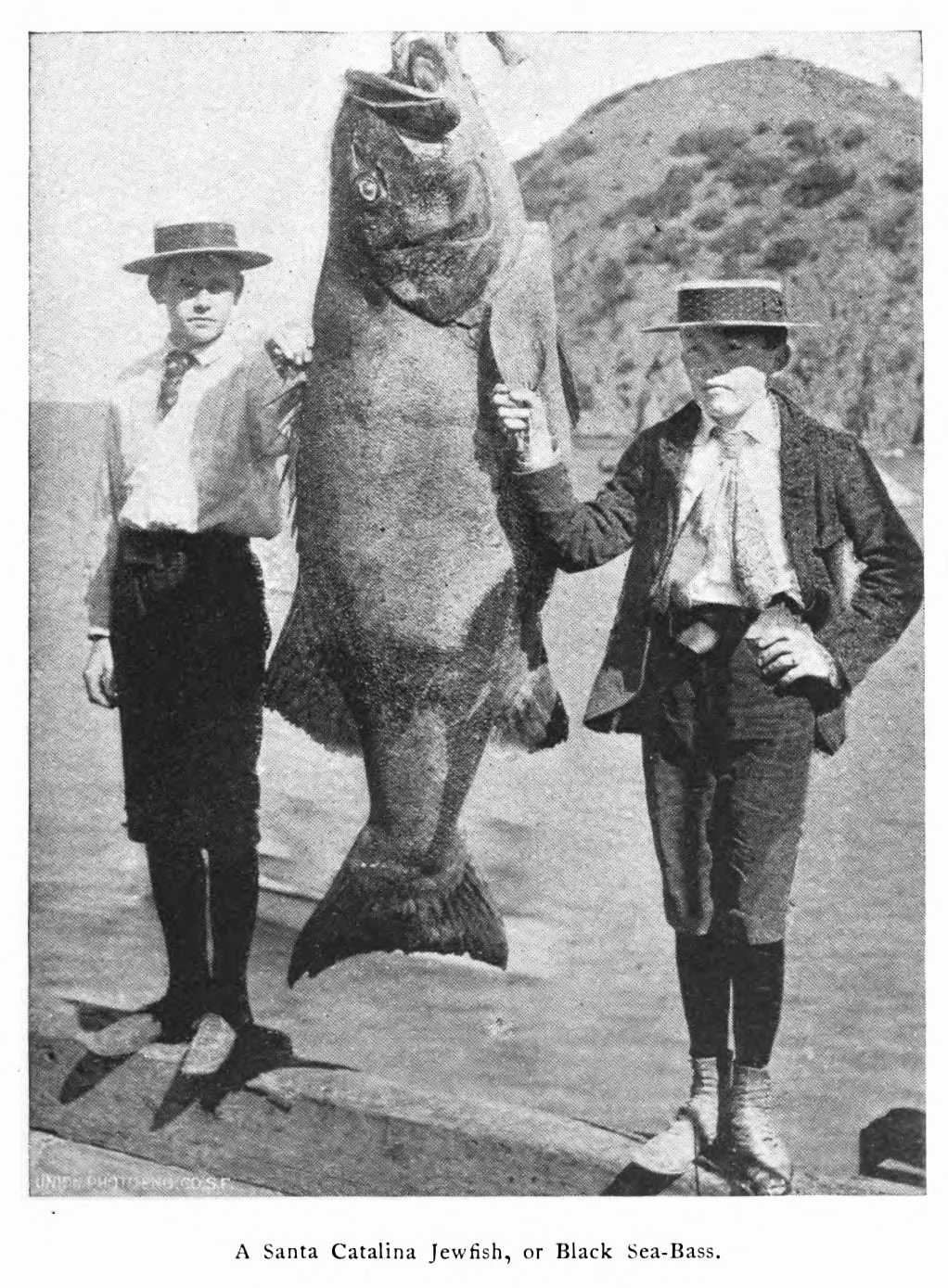
"A Santa Catalina Jewfish, or Black Sea-Bass" (Santa Catalina, an isle of summer, 1895)

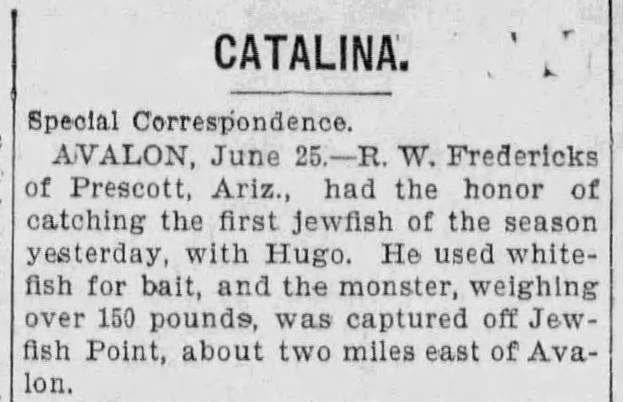
News items from Catalina in the Los Angeles Evening Express of June 25, 1897

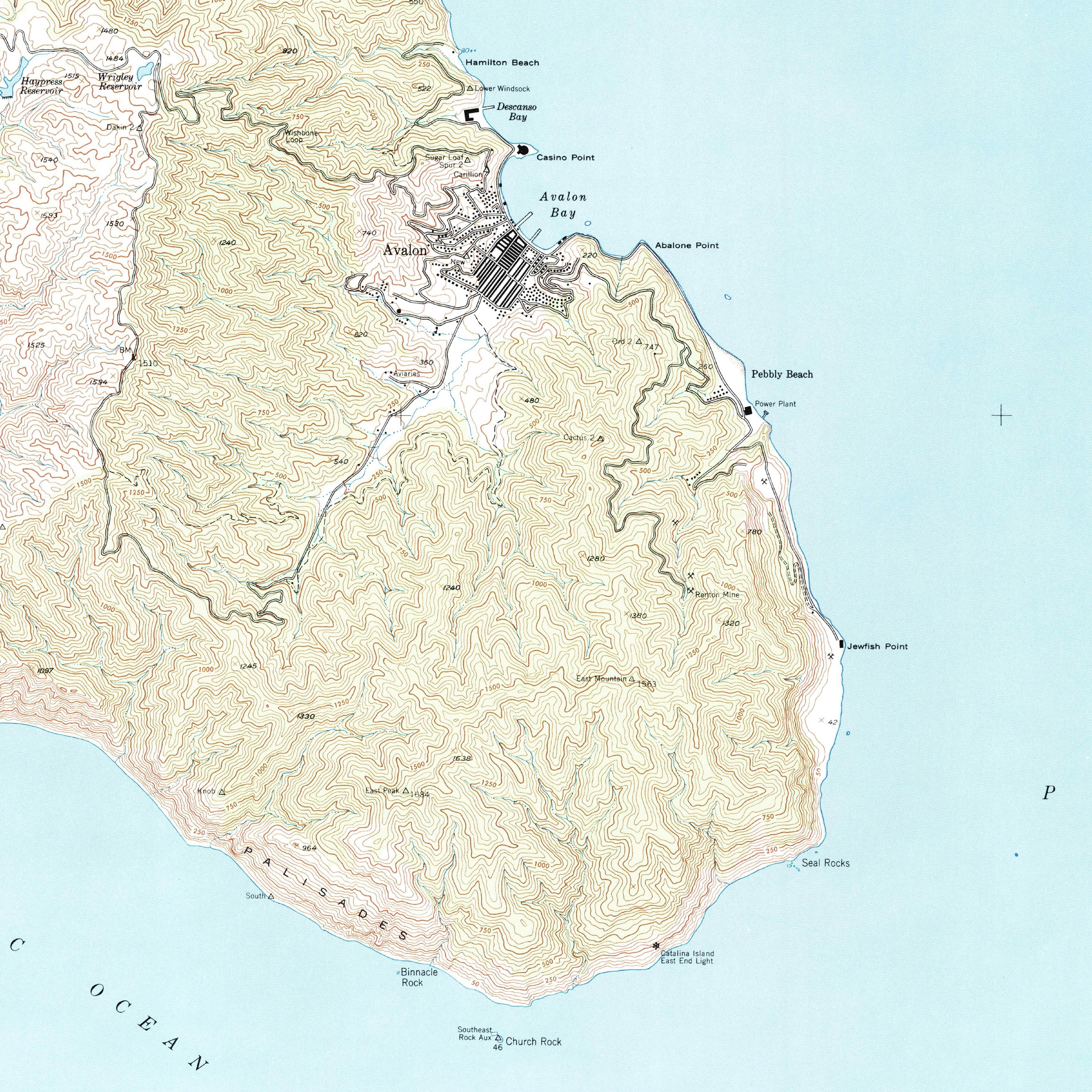
Jewfish Point is on the southeastern end of Catalina (1943 USGS topographical map)

Jewfish Point is a headland at the far southern end of Santa Catalina Island in Los Angeles County, in the U.S. state of California. The point was named for a type of big fish, formerly known as the jewfish, that is prized for its taste. The fish has been renamed due to the old name's offensive nature but the old name persists in several toponyms. The waters around the point were believed to yield "record-breaking black sea bass" for fishermen. This slow-growing fish now commonly called giant sea bass (binomial name Stereolepis gigas) is listed as a critically endangered species on the IUCN Red List.

The point is used as a landmark for defining marine areas near the island, such as a commercial fishing restriction in the 1960s. It is currently one of the boundaries of the Binnacle Rock to Jewfish Point Area of Special Biological Significance, defined as the 2.7 miles (4.3 km) of coastline between the two points, and extending out to 300-foot isobath or one nautical mile (whichever is greater). This marine protected area was established off Catalina in 1974. Per the California State Water Resources Control Board, the designation that a place is an area of special biological significance (ASBS) means that it supports "an unusual variety of aquatic life, and often...unique individual species".

Jewfish Point is a popular destination for underwater divers. The land route to the site is what a 1923 botanical survey described as "difficult and uncomfortable scrambling about among the rock debris along the shore". Plants observed at Jewfish Point at that time included Nicotiana glauca, laurel sumac, lemonadeberry, woolly Indian paintbrush, California black sage (then classified as Ramona stachyoides), Eriogonum giganteum, and toyon.

A 1950s oceanographic survey reported sandy mud at 48 fathoms, along with many brittle stars, seed shrimp, tubicolous anemones, many shells of Laqueus californicus, and a number of other types of sea creatures.

== See also ==
- Peninsulas of California
- Cat Harbor State Marine Conservation Area
