= False Tillamook =

Archaic placename in Oregon

Coordinates: 45°45′57″N 123°58′57″W

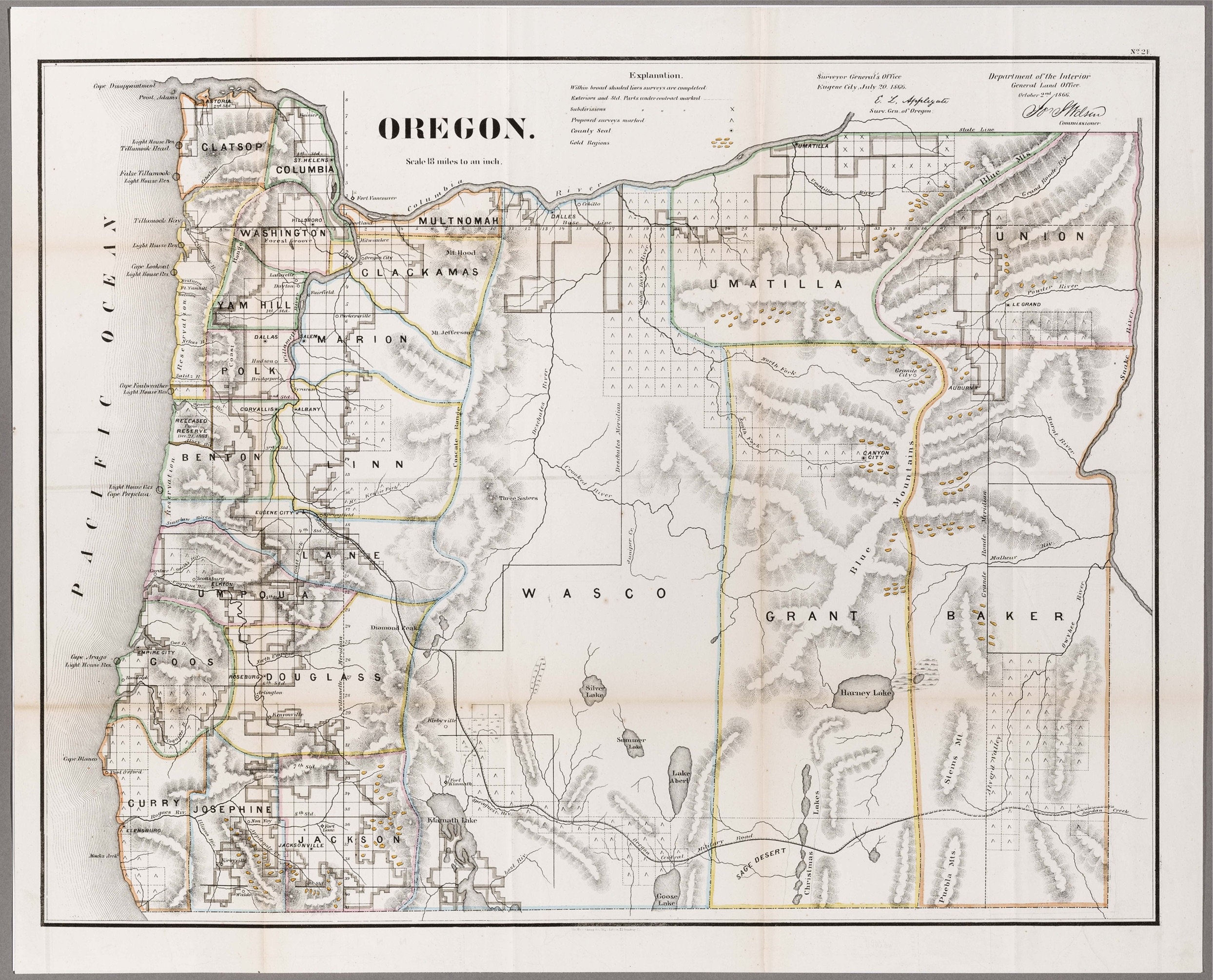
False Tillamook pictured on an 1866 United States survey map (Oregon Historical Society Digital Library)

False Tillamook is an archaic placename for a headland in Tillamook County in the U.S. state of Oregon. False Tillamook is now known as Cape Falcon, Oregon. False Tillamook is the next coastal promontory south from Arch Cape. Robert Greenhow, in his History of Oregon and California, confused False Tillamook Head with Clarks Point of View.

== See also ==
- Peninsulas of Oregon
