= Cañada Honda Creek =

River in Santa Barbara County, California, US

Coordinates: 34°36′30″N 120°38′15″W

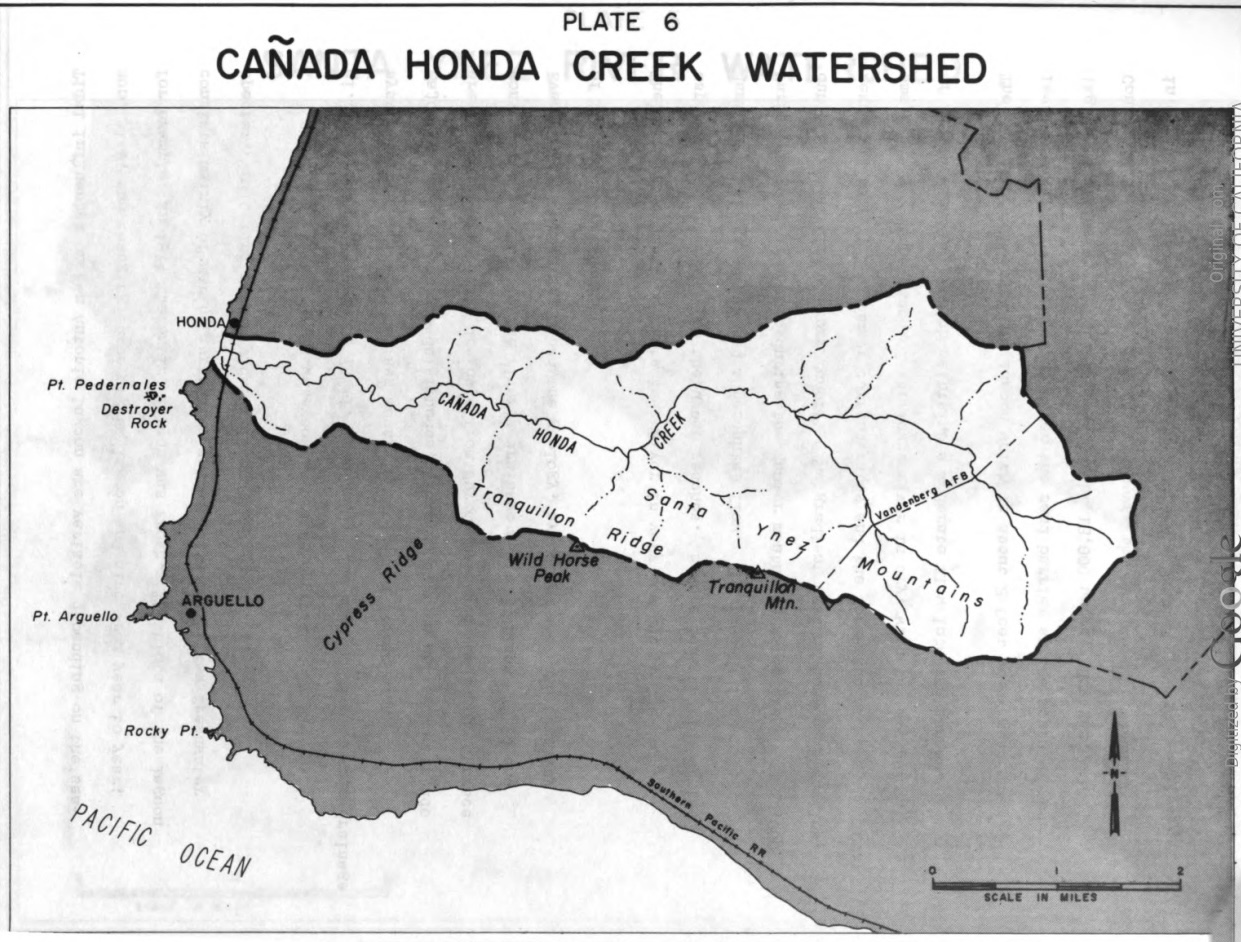
Cañada Honda Creek watershed map

Cañada Honda Creek (Spanish: deep little canyon) is a perennial stream in Santa Barbara County, California, United States, that lies almost entirely within Vandenberg Space Force Base and meets the Pacific Ocean just north of Point Pedernales. Cañada Honda is part of the larger Santa Barbara coastal plain water resource subbasin (USGS hydrologic unit code 18060013).

The stream "rises on the west slope of the Lompoc Hills, at altitude 1,200 feet (370 m) above sea level; flows north of west to the point at which it enters the Pacific." Cañada Honda runs for about 9 miles (14 km), and drains a watershed of 12 square miles (31 km^{2}). The creek is "inaccessible, for the most part, due to the steep cliffs and densely-vegetated riparian woodland." The creek supports a population of tidewater goby. The creek lent its name to Honda station when "the last link of the Southern Pacific coast line between Surf and Ellwood was completed in 1900." There is a railroad bridge over the creekbed at the ocean.

The Honda Formation is a geological formation of "several thousand feet of clay shale exposed only in the extreme western Santa Ynez Mountains at Cañada Honda, from 1 mile to 4 miles east of Point Pedernales."

== See also ==
- Honda Point disaster
- San Antonio Creek (Vandenberg Space Force Base)
