= Honda, California =

Archaic placename in California, United States

- Unincorporated community
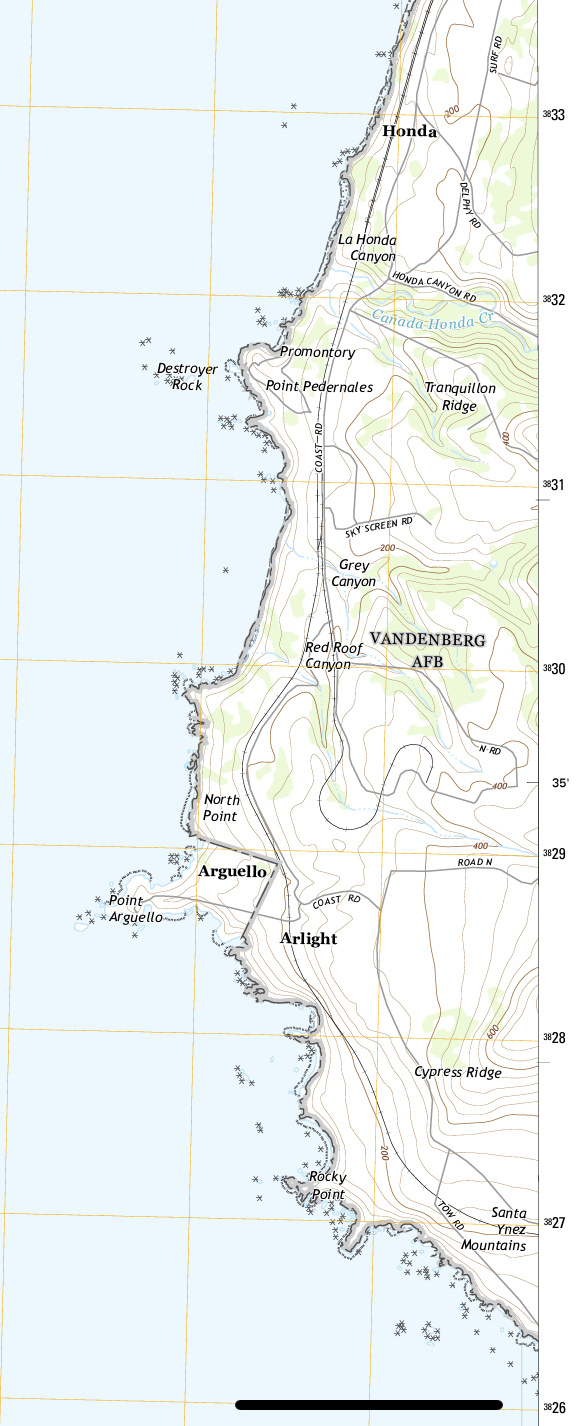
- Detail of Guadalupe quadrangle, 2015

- Location within California
- Coordinates: 34°36′56″N 120°38′01″W
- Country: United States
- State: California
- County: Santa Barbara
- Elevation: 92 ft (28 m)
- Time zone: UTC-8 (Pacific (PST))
  - Summer (DST): UTC-7 (PDT)
- Area codes: 805 & 820
- GNIS feature ID: 1660767

Honda was a remote and sparsely populated rural district in the vicinity of Cañada Honda Creek in Santa Barbara County, California, United States. The area produced sweet peas and beans, and supported dairy farms. A newspaper account of 1947 stated, "The Jesus Maria rancho, Packard rancho, Bear Creek ranch, Honda section, and a large area in the lower [Lompoc] valley once yielded great crops of cattle and produce and furnished a livelihood for many families." The area is now part of Vandenberg Space Force Base.

== History ==
The main feature of the area, other than the creek, was a Southern Pacific rail stop that opened in 1898. The station, located between Arlight and Surf, was built on land that was part of the "old Steele place now owned by H. Dutard." Honda station was the site of a 1907 train wreck that killed 32 people. The victims were primarily Shriners coming from a conference.

Due to a sharp turn in the coastline, and sharp rocks and reef formations underwater, the spot was risky for ships when the coastal landmarks and/or lighthouses of Point Arguello, Point Sal, and Point Sur were obscured by darkness and foggy, low-visibility conditions. Honda was the site of several shipwrecks including 1923 Honda Point disaster that destroyed seven U.S. Navy ships off the coast, just north of Point Arguello. Locals pulled up railroad ties from Honda station and lit them on fire with kerosene to provide illumination for the nighttime rescue of the shipwrecked sailors. The steamer Santa Rosa ran aground at the mouth of Honda Creek in 1911; four crewmembers were killed. The steamer Harvard ran aground "directly opposite Honda station" in 1931.

A seawall was also built along the Honda coastline in 1906 but there was little evidence of it left 30 years later. In 1926 Honda was the site of a rock-crushing operation that was providing road-construction materials to the county. A new schoolhouse was built for the Honda district in 1933. There are no buildings or people left at Honda today, only a "long passing track" north of the arroyo.

== See also ==
- Guadalupe-Nipomo Dunes
- Peninsulas of California
