= Cape Creek =

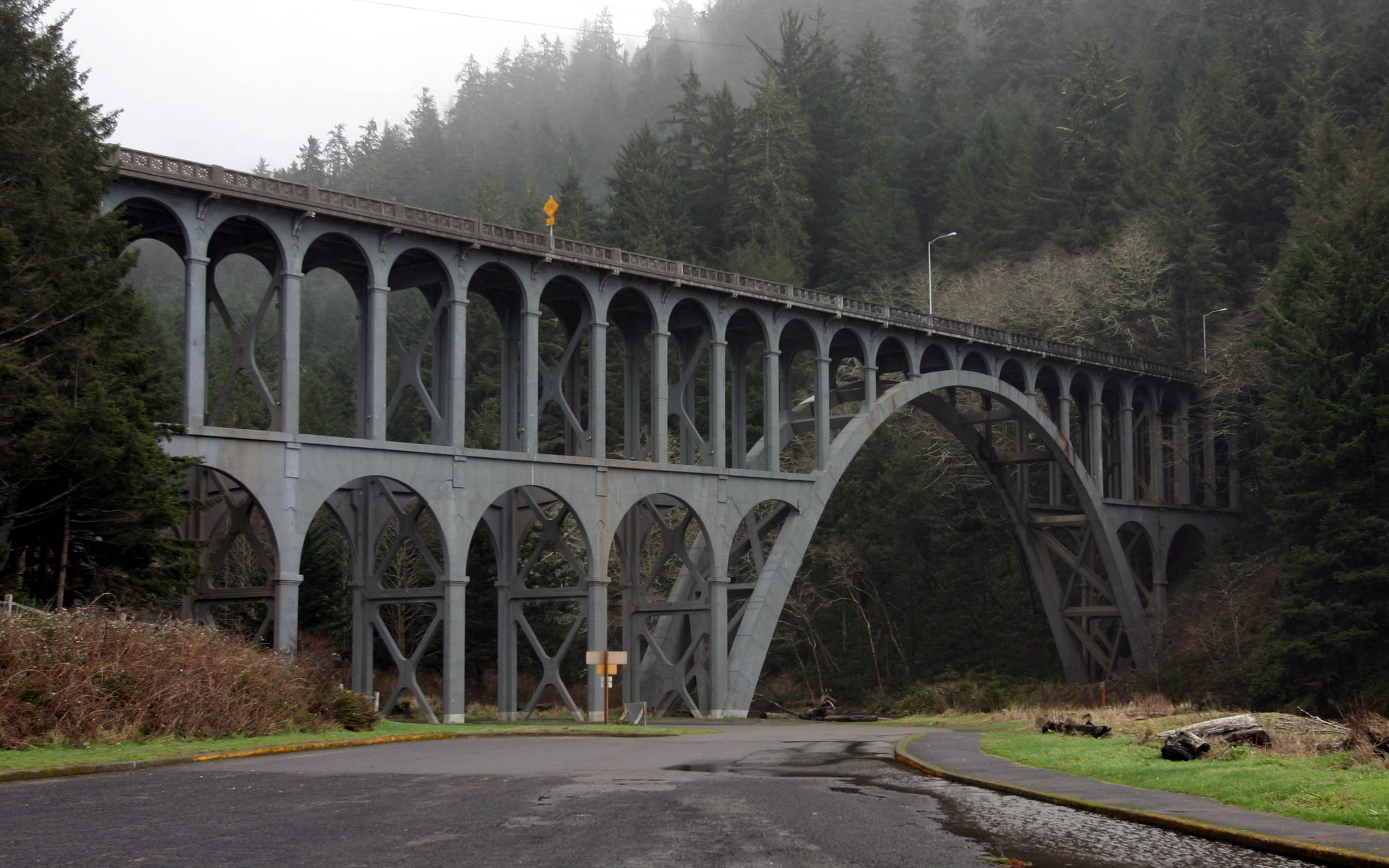
- Cape Creek passes under Cape Creek Bridge, which carries U.S. Route 101.

- Location of the mouth of Cape Creek in Oregon

Location
- Country: United States
- State: Oregon
- County: Lane

Physical characteristics
- Source: near Herman Peak
  - location: Central Oregon Coast Range, Siuslaw National Forest
  - coordinates: 44°07′47″N 124°00′19″W
- Mouth: Pacific Ocean
  - location: Heceta Head
  - coordinates: 44°08′03″N 124°07′25″W

Cape Creek is a stream that enters the Pacific Ocean along the coast of Lane County in the U.S. state of Oregon. Beginning near Herman Peak in the Central Oregon Coast Range, it flows generally west through the Siuslaw National Forest to the ocean at Heceta Head. The creek's named tributaries are North Fork Cape Creek and, further downstream, Wapiti Creek.

Along its lower reaches, the creek flows through the former Devil's Elbow State Park, which was expanded and renamed Heceta Head Lighthouse State Scenic Viewpoint. Near its mouth, the creek passes under Cape Creek Bridge, which carries U.S. Route 101, and enters an ocean cove on the south side of the headland.

The state scenic viewpoint, a day-use area, has picnic tables above the cove at the mouth of Cape Creek. Amenities in the park include lighthouse tours and access to fishing, hiking, and wildlife watching. Groups can rent Heceta House, an historic structure related to the lighthouse, for special events or as a bed and breakfast lodge.

== See also ==
- List of rivers of Oregon
