= Cape Creek Bridge =

- Cape Creek Bridge No. 01113
- U.S. National Register of Historic Places
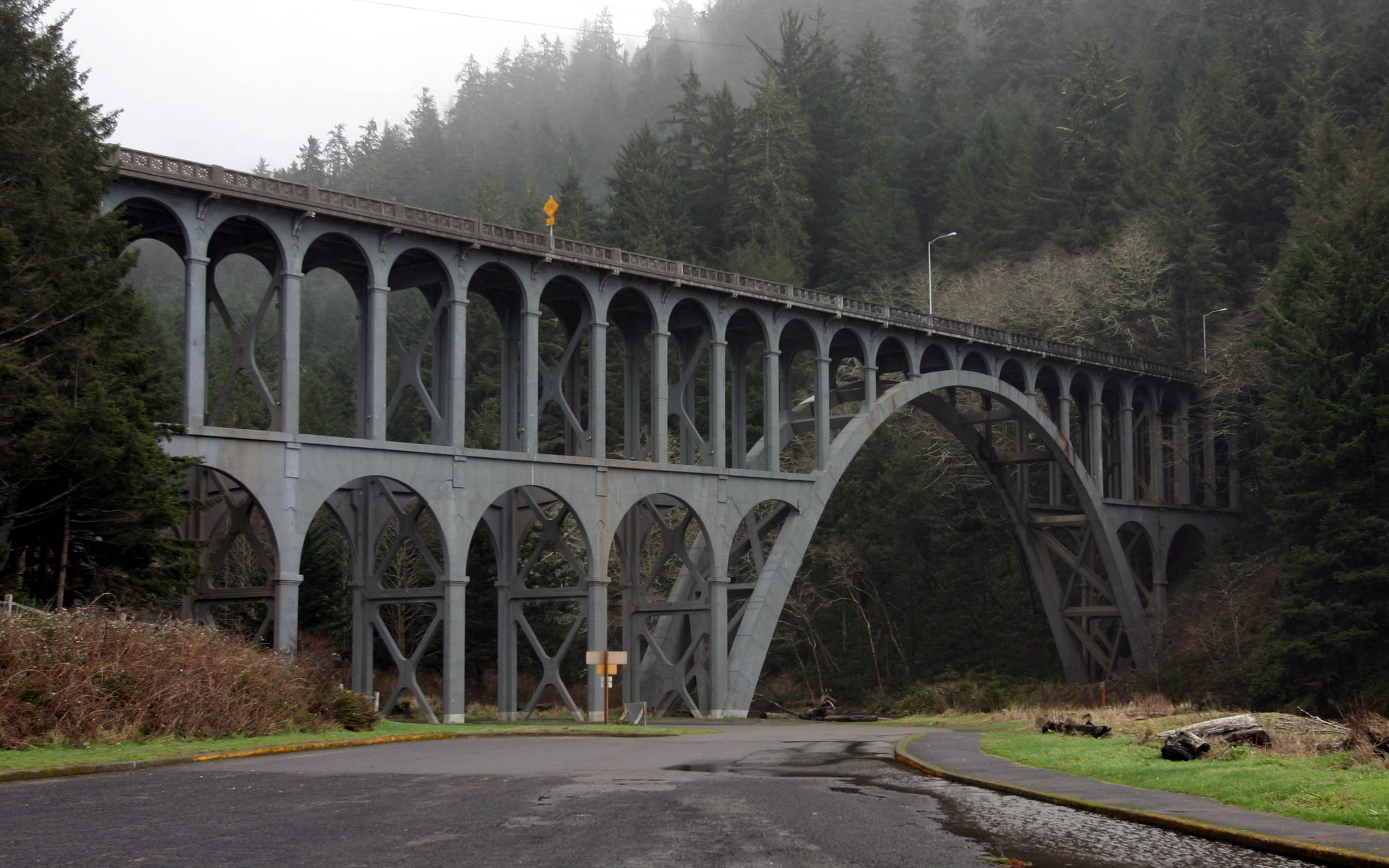
- Location: US 101
- Coordinates: 44°08′01″N 124°07′19″W
- Built: 1932
- Architect: Conde B. McCullough
- MPS: C. B. McCullough Major Oregon Coast Highway Bridges, 1927-1936 MPS
- NRHP reference No.: 05000820
- Added to NRHP: 2005

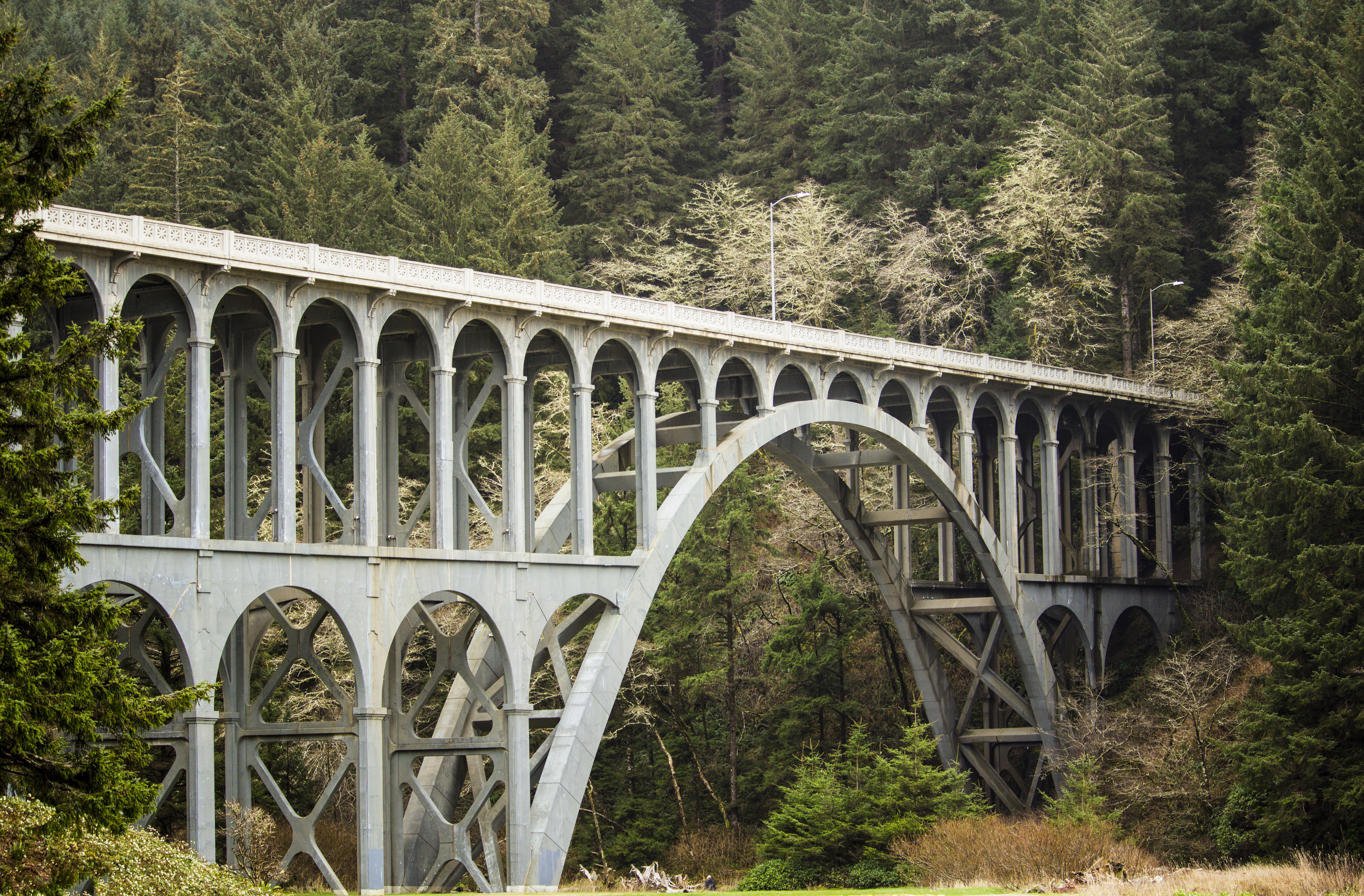
Cape Creek Bridge, Oregon

Cape Creek Bridge is an arch bridge that spans Cape Creek in Lane County, Oregon, United States. The bridge carries U.S. Route 101. Opened in 1932, it was designed by noted bridge engineer Conde McCullough and built of reinforced concrete by John K. Holt. The total length of the bridge is 619 feet (189 m), with a main span of 220 feet (67 m). The bridge resembles a Roman aqueduct, with a single parabolic arch that spans half its length. It was listed as Cape Creek Bridge No. 01113 on the National Register of Historic Places in 2005, as part of the C. B. McCullough Major Oregon Coast Highway Bridges MPS (Multiple Property Submission).

== Corrosion protection ==
The Cape Creek Bridge has been impressed-current cathodically protected (ICCP) from corrosion since 1991. Rebar in concrete is highly susceptible to corrosion by chloride ions from seawater and de-icing salts. Contractors to the Oregon Department of Transportation have plasma-sprayed 102,000 square feet (9,500 m^{2}) of 0.020-inch-thick (0.5 mm) zinc onto the exposed concrete to provide a sacrificial anode that corrodes in lieu of the steel rebar.

== See also ==
- Heceta Head
- List of bridges documented by the Historic American Engineering Record in Oregon
- List of bridges on the National Register of Historic Places in Oregon
- List of bridges on U.S. Route 101 in Oregon
