= Castle Rock, Clatsop County, Oregon =

Landform in Oregon, United States

Coordinates: 45.8059°N 123.9829°W

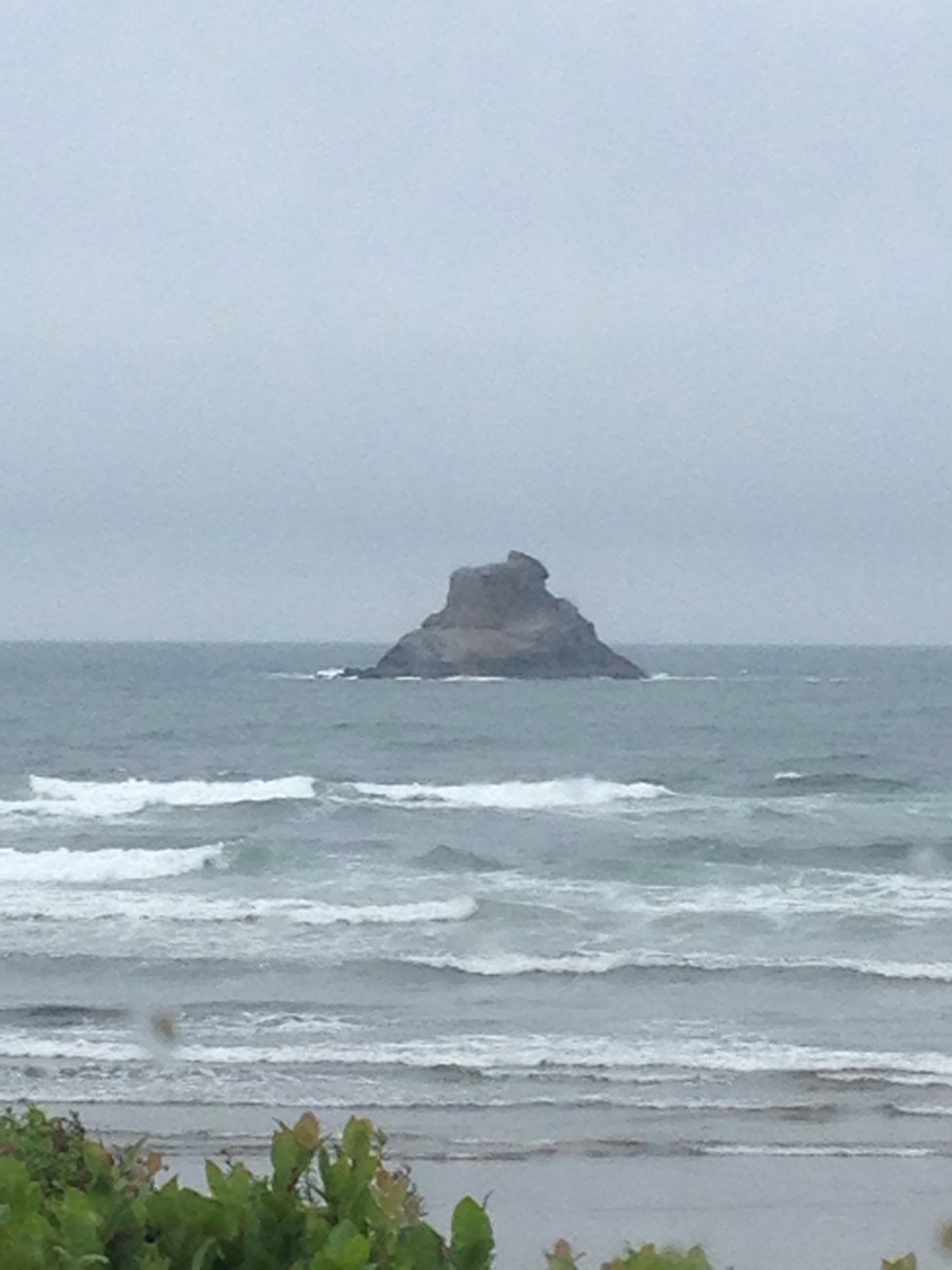
A view of Castle Rock from the east

Castle Rock is a large monolith right off the coast of Arch Cape, Oregon. It is named Castle Rock because it resembles a castle turret. The rock is Basalt, formed millions of years ago from lava flows.

It is sometimes called Queen Vic rock by locals, (referring to Queen Victoria) because on the west side, there is a rock pattern that loosely resembles the face of Queen Victoria.
