= Big Creek Bridge (Oregon) =

- Big Creek Bridge No. 01180
- U.S. National Register of Historic Places
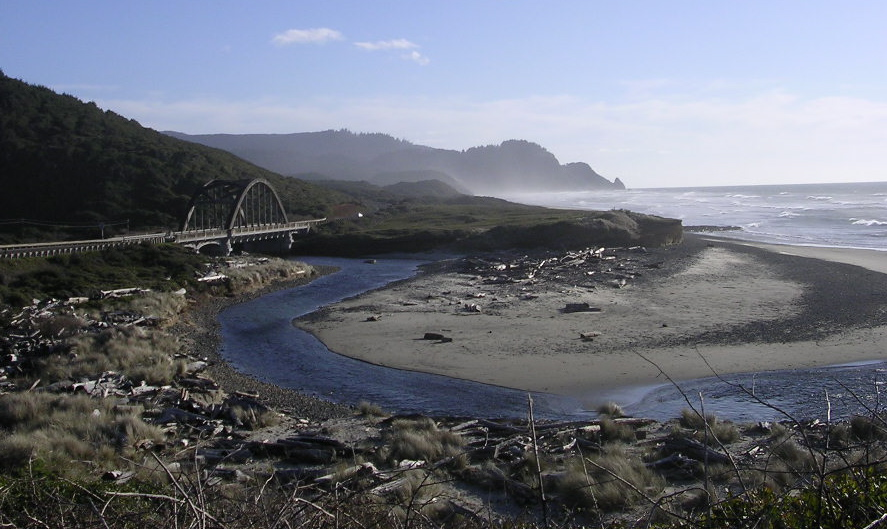
- Big Creek Bridge

- Location within Oregon Location within the United States
- Location: US 101
- Nearest city: Heceta Head, Oregon
- Coordinates: 44°10′28″N 124°06′55″W
- Built: 1931
- Architect: Conde B. McCullough, Union Bridge Company
- Architectural style: Classical Revival, Art Deco
- MPS: C. B. McCullough Major Oregon Coast Highway Bridges MPS
- NRHP reference No.: 05000819
- Added to NRHP: August 5, 2005

The Big Creek Bridge is a bowstring arch bridge that spans Big Creek on U.S. Route 101 in Lane County, Oregon. It was designed by Conde McCullough and opened in 1931.

The bridge has a total length of 180 ft (55 m) and contains one 120 ft (37 m) reinforced concrete tied arch, identical in design to Ten Mile Creek Bridge and Wilson River Bridge. The locations for all three bridges were similar in that the sandy foundations were not secure enough for the abutment piers required to relieve the lateral pressure of traditional arches. The flood levels of the rivers approached the road grade and ruled out the use of reinforced concrete girders. The corrosive salt air eliminated the practicality of steel truss bridges. The design of the bridge was similar to the rainbow arch design patented by James Barney Marsh.

The bridge, along with the Ten Mile Creek Bridge and the Wilson River Bridge, was rehabilitated in 1996 to increase the overhead clearance and add a cathodic protection system to protect the embedded steel reinforcement against the corrosive air. A project to replace the cathodic protection system began in February 2014.

== See also ==
- List of bridges documented by the Historic American Engineering Record in Oregon
- List of bridges on U.S. Route 101 in Oregon
- List of bridges on the National Register of Historic Places in Oregon
