= Peninsulas of California =

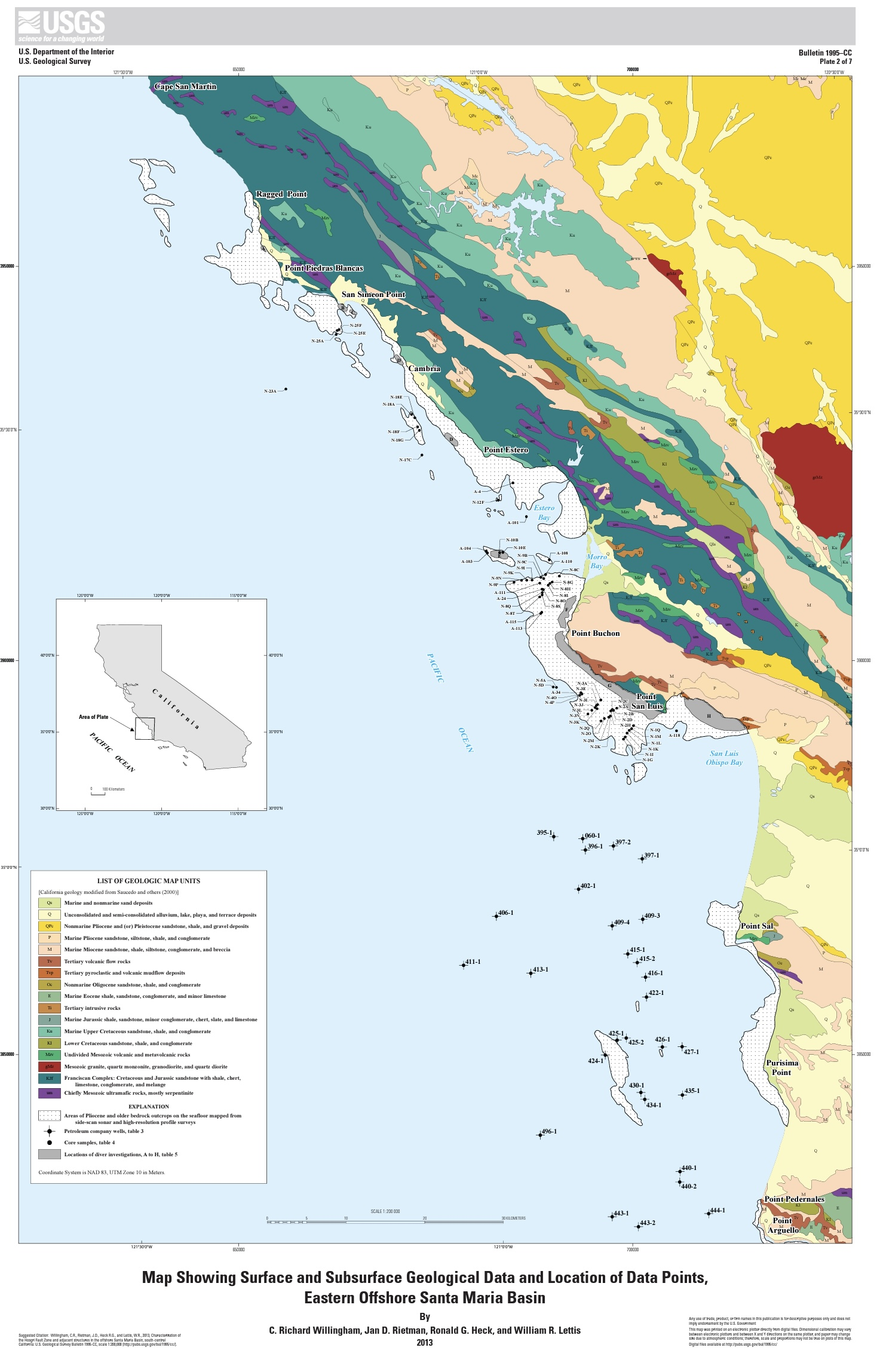
USGS map marking Cape San Martin, Ragged Point, Point Piedras Blancas, San Simeon Point, Point Estero, Point Buchon, Point San Luis, Point Sal, Purisima Point, Point Pedernales, and Point Arguello

Many coastal peninsulas in California are properly headlands. They are often called points, as in Oxford English Dictionary's senses 19b "projecting part of anything of a more or less tapering form...a sharp prominence" and 22 "a promontory or cape; the tip of a piece of land running out to sea...frequently in place names."

== Major navigation and geographic landmarks ==
This is a list of landmark coastal peninsulas of the U.S. state of California, ordered north to south. Unless otherwise noted, the source is plate 144 from the Atlas of the War of the Rebellion, drawn in 1867 and published in 1895.

1. Point St. George
2. Patrick's Point, also Rocky Point (see Sue-meg State Park)
3. Cape Fortuna, or False Mendocino
4. Cape Mendocino
5. Punta Gorda (see also Punta Gorda Light)
6. Point Arena (see also Point Arena Light and Point Arena State Marine Conservation Area)
7. Bodega Head (see also Bodega Head State Marine Conservation Arena)
8. Point Tomales (see Tomales Bay)
9. Tiburon Peninsula
10. Point Reyes
11. Duxbury Reef (see Duxbury Reef State Marine Conservation Area)
12. Marin Headlands
13. San Francisco Peninsula
14. Point Bonita (see Point Bonita Lighthouse)
15. Point Lobos
16. Point San Pedro
17. Pillar Point
18. Pigeon Point (see Pigeon Point Lighthouse)
19. Point Año Nuevo (see also Año Nuevo Island, Año Nuevo State Park, Año Nuevo State Marine Conservation Area and Greyhound Rock State Marine Conservation Area)
20. Monterey Peninsula
21. Point Pinos (see Point Pinos Lighthouse)
22. Point Cypress
23. Point Carmel
24. Point Sur (see also Point Sur Lighthouse and Point Sur State Marine Reserve and Marine Conservation Area)
25. Cape San Martin (originally another Point Gorda, Punta Gorda "fat tip" in Spanish, see Gorda, California)
26. Piedras Blancas (see also Piedras Blancas Light Station and Piedras Blancas State Marine Reserve and Marine Conservation Area)
27. Cayucos Point
28. Point Buchon (see also Point Buchon State Marine Reserve and Marine Conservation Area)
29. Point San Luis (see also Point San Luis Lighthouse and Port San Luis harbor)
30. Fossil Point
31. Mallagh Landing
32. South Point
33. Mussel Rock
34. Point Sal (see also Point Sal State Beach)
35. Purísima Point (see also La Purísima Mission)
36. Point Pedernales, aka Honda Point (see also Honda, California, Honda Point disaster, and Vandenberg Space Force Base)
37. Point Arguello (see also Point Arguello Light)
38. Rocky Point
39. Point Conception (see also Point Conception Light and Point Conception State Marine Reserve)
40. Point Salinas
41. Point Mugu (see also Point Mugu State Park)
42. Point Dume (see also Point Dume State Marine Conservation Area)
43. Point Vicente (see Point Vicente Lighthouse)
44. Palos Verdes Peninsula
45. Point Fermin (see Point Fermin Light)
46. "False Point at False Bay" (gone, see Mission Bay (San Diego) § History)
47. Point Loma

== Other headlands, promontories and rocks ==
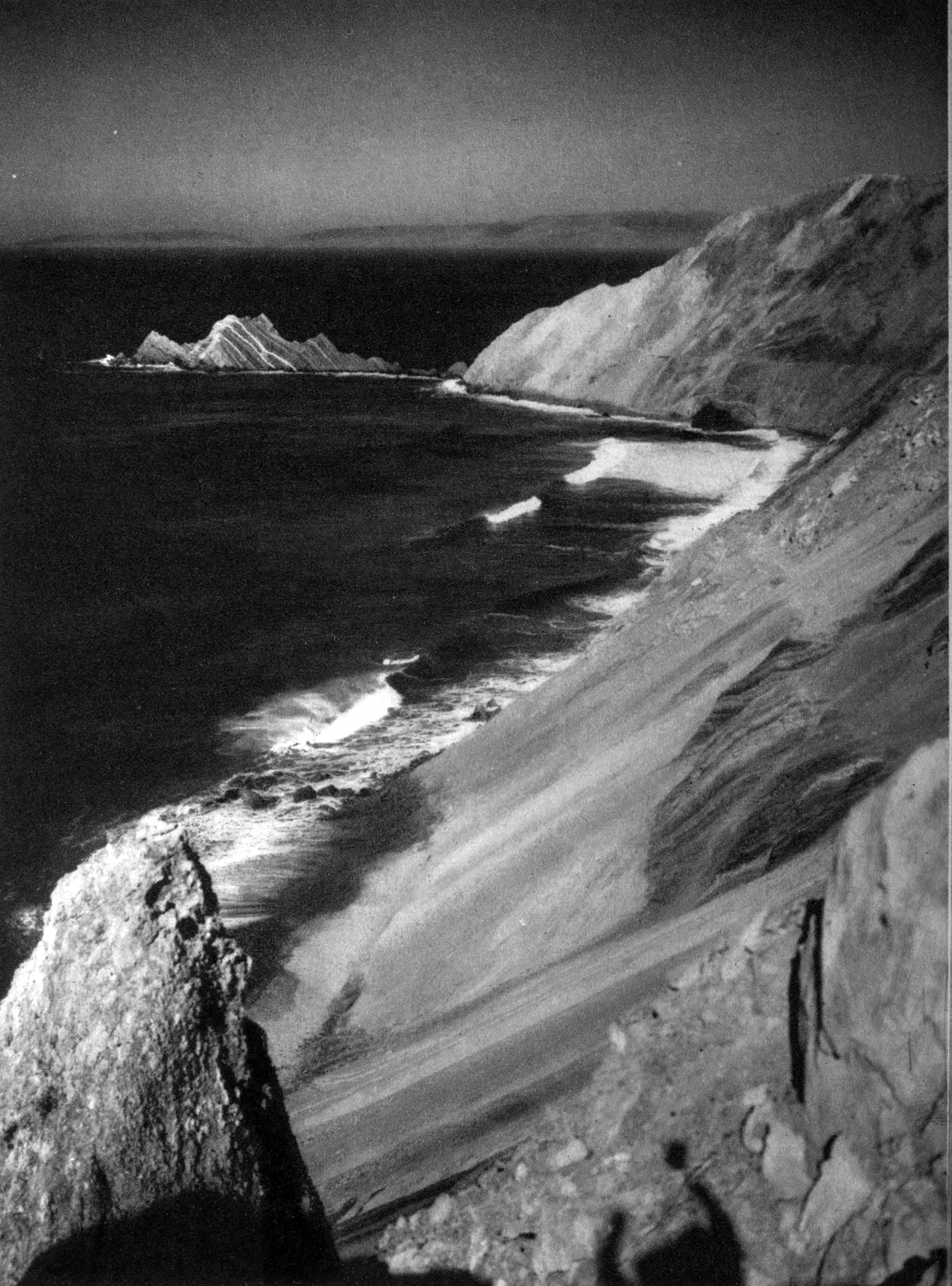
Pedro Point, Gulf of the Farallones

Ordered alphabetically:

- Black Point
- Comanche Point
- Dana Point
- Duncans Point
- Muir Beach Overlook
- Point Cabrillo (see also Point Cabrillo Light)
- Point Lobos
- Point Pinole Regional Shoreline
- Point San Quentin
- Point Potrero
- Potrero Point
- Ragged Point
- San Francisco Peninsula
- Steamboat Point
- Trinidad Head
- Salt Point (see Salt Point State Park)
- White Point

== See also ==
- California Coastal National Monument
- California Coastal Trail
- List of lighthouses in California
- Baja California peninsula
- Peninsulas of Oregon
