= Big Creek (Lane County, Oregon) =

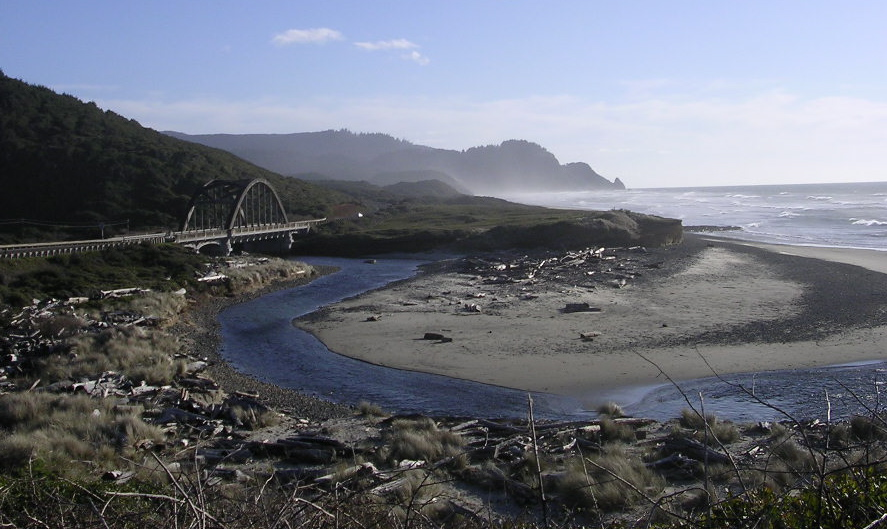
- The creek flows under Big Creek Bridge and enters the ocean north of Heceta Head.

- Location of the mouth of Big Creek in Oregon

Location
- Country: United States
- State: Oregon
- County: Lane

Physical characteristics
- Source: Saddle Mountain Spring
  - location: Central Oregon Coast Range, Siuslaw National Forest
  - coordinates: 44°11′13″N 123°58′04″W
  - elevation: 2,095 ft (639 m)
- Mouth: Pacific Ocean
  - location: north of Heceta Head
  - coordinates: 44°10′35″N 124°06′53″W
  - elevation: 52 ft (16 m)

Big Creek is a stream that enters the Pacific Ocean along the coast of Lane County in the U.S. state of Oregon. Beginning at Saddle Mountain Spring in the Central Oregon Coast Range, it flows generally west through the Siuslaw National Forest to the ocean north of Heceta Head. Near its mouth, it passes under Big Creek Bridge, which carries U.S. Route 101.

The creek's two named tributaries are Panther Creek and, further downstream, Fryingpan Creek. Upstream of Panther Creek is the Big Creek Campground, a Lane County park with four sites for tents. Amenities include toilets but no drinking water, and the campground provides access to fishing, hiking, and hunting.

== See also ==
- List of rivers of Oregon
