= Hug Point State Recreation Site =

State park in Oregon, United States

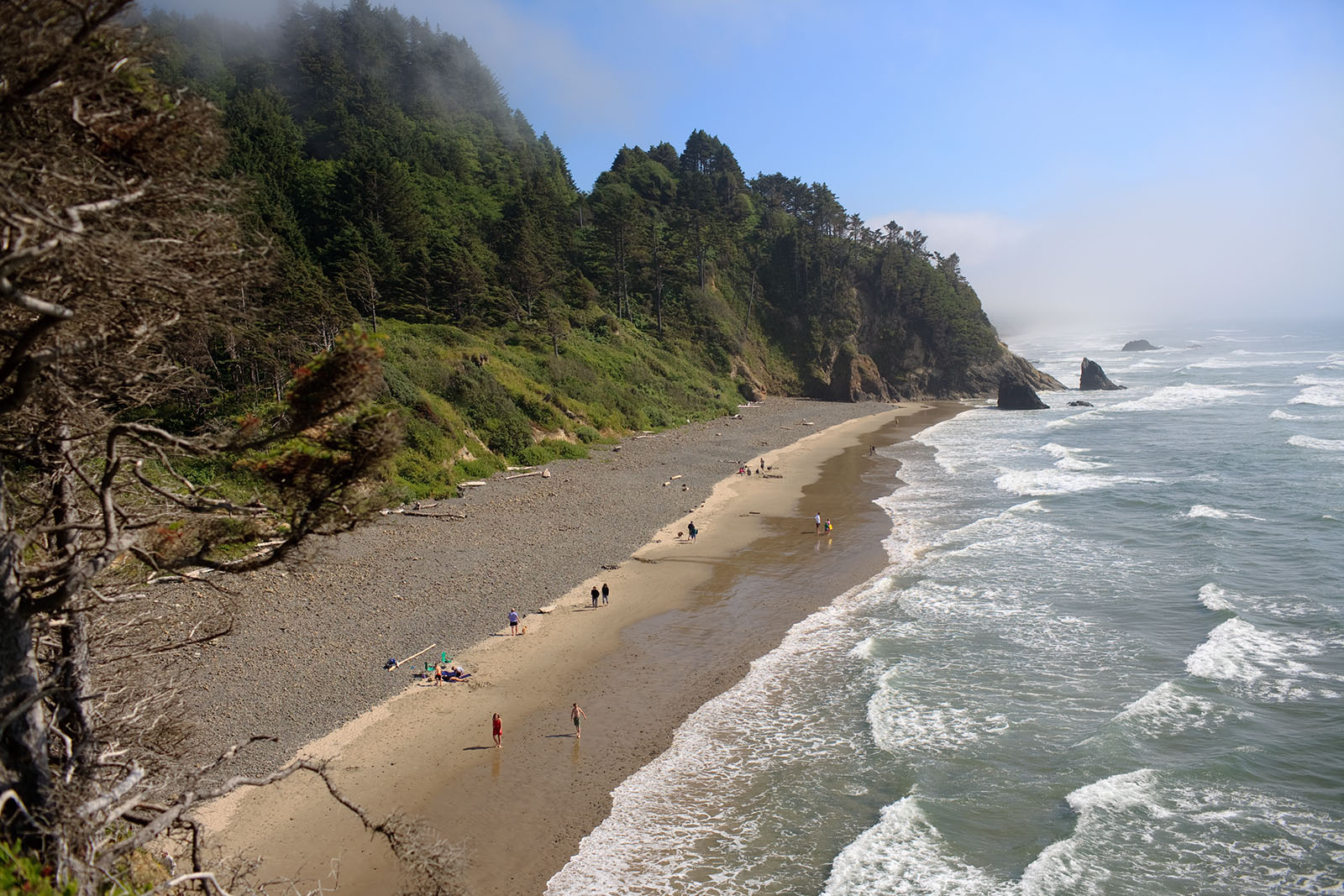
- View from near the parking area

- Location within Oregon Location within the United States
- Type: Public, state
- Location: Clatsop County, Oregon
- Nearest city: Cannon Beach
- Coordinates: 45°49′31″N 123°57′40″W
- Area: 43 acres (17 ha)
- Operator: Oregon Parks and Recreation Department
- Status: Day use, year-round
- Parking: One parking area

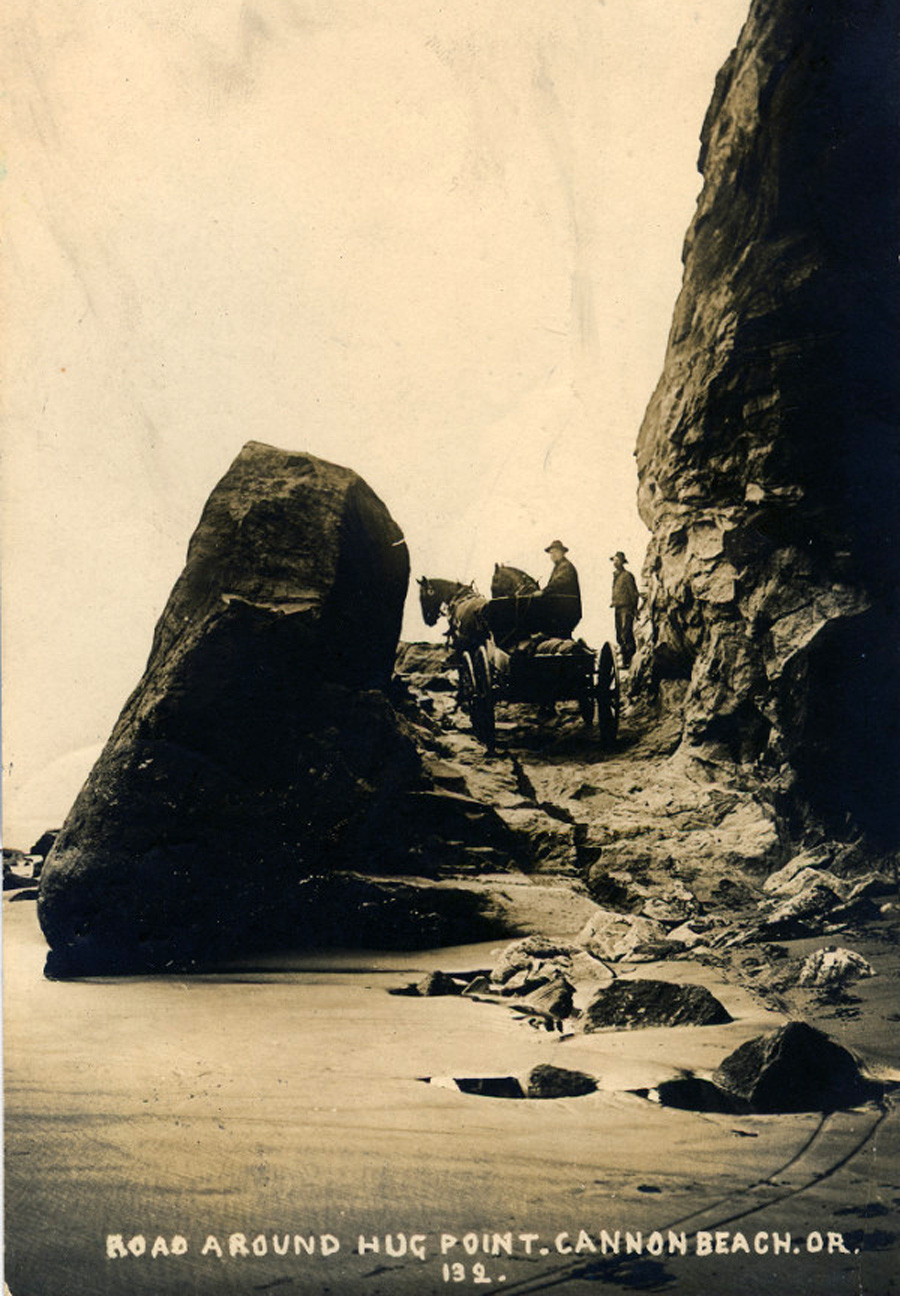
A wagon and team cross Hug Point around the turn of the 20th century. The road, which is still there, was chipped into the rocky headland so wagons, stagecoaches and cars would not have to drive out into the surf to get around the point.

Hug Point State Recreation Site is a state park on the northern Oregon Coast in the U.S. state of Oregon. Administered by the Oregon Parks and Recreation Department, the park is open to the public and is fee-free. Amenities at the park, which is 5 miles (8.0 km) south of Cannon Beach along U.S. Route 101, include picnicking, fishing, and a Pacific Ocean beach.

== History ==
Late 19th century stagecoaches that used the beach as a highway "had to 'hug' this particular point even at low tide to get around it", hence the name, Hug Point. Hug Point, the cape for which it is named, lies in the park.

The recreation site, in 2024, was the location of the first sighting in the United States of a Blue rock thrush, a bird indigenous to Asia and Europe.

== Roadbed around the head ==
The primitive roadbed was chipped into the head by unknown persons around the turn of the 20th century to facilitate access to Arch Cape, which at the time was accessible only by driving a horse-drawn or motorized vehicle on the beach. This sometimes necessitated driving directly into the surf—an inconvenience in a stagecoach or wagon, but a real hazard in motorcars, which were far easier to get stuck and were disabled and immobilized by relatively small waves. A persistent rumor claims that the roadbed was made by a man whose brand-new Maxwell car got stuck and was submerged by the incoming tide in the 1920s; however, photographic evidence shows the road was there well before 1920, and Oregon popular historian Ralph Friedman interviewed a stage driver who remembered using it before World War I.

== Site description ==
The 43-acre (17 ha) park has a large parking area, public restrooms, and a sloping walkway to the beach. Erosion has formed caves in sandstone cliffs along the headland's south side, which is also the site of a seasonal waterfall. The Oregon Coast Trail passes through the park along the beach.

== See also ==
- List of Oregon state parks
