= Lompoc Hills =

Mountain range in Santa Barbara County, California, United States

- Location within California Location within the United States

Highest point
- Elevation: 411 m (1,348 ft)

Geography
- Country: United States
- State: California
- District: Santa Barbara County
- Range coordinates: 34°34′55.943″N 120°27′44.587″W
- Topo map: USGS Lompoc Hills

The Lompoc Hills are a low mountain range in the Transverse Ranges, near the coast and Lompoc in western Santa Barbara County, California.

Part of the range is located within the Vandenberg Air Force Base.
