= Heceta Island =

Island in southeastern Alaska, United States

Coordinates: 55°45′52″N 133°31′55″W

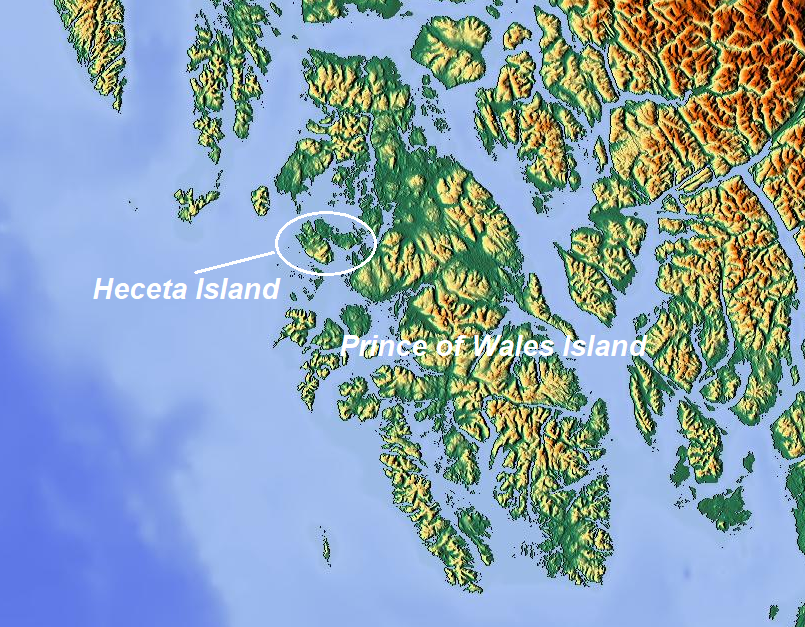
Location of Heceta Island

Heceta Island (pronounced HECK–ah–Ta) is an island in the Alexander Archipelago of southeastern Alaska, United States. It lies just off the west coast of Prince of Wales Island. Kosciusko Island lies to its north, while Tuxekan Island lies to its northeast. Directly to its south are the Maurelle Islands group, while further south are Noyes Island, Lulu Island, and San Fernando Island. The island's area is 181.0 km^{2} (69.88 sq mi).

The island was given its name by W. H. Dall in 1879, in honor of Spanish navigator Bruno de Heceta.
