= Comanche Point =

- Location within California

Highest point
- Elevation: 1,073 ft (327 m) NAVD 88
- Coordinates: 35°07′26″N 118°49′21″W

Geography
- Location: Kern County, California, U.S.
- Parent range: Transverse Ranges, Tejon Hills
- Topo map: USGS Tejon Hills

Comanche Point is the northwestern headland and prominence of the Tejon Hills, notably extending westward into the southern San Joaquin Valley, west of the Tehachapi Mountains. It is approximately 4 miles (6.4 km) south of Arvin, in Kern County, California.

== Ecology ==
Comanche Point and the rest of the Tejon Hills are on the Tejon Ranch, in the section managed by the Tejon Ranch Conservancy.

There are natural alkali springs and marshes on Comanche Point and the alkaline uplifted marine sediment deposits that form it, which support locally and regionally endemic and rare California native plants (flora).

The major threats to the areas rare flora and fauna are overgrazing, rooting feral pigs, and invasive plant species.

== See also ==
- Tehachapi Mountains-related articles — see " ~ " section for endemic flora.
