= Arch Cape, Oregon =

Unincorporated community in the state of Oregon, United States

- Unincorporated community
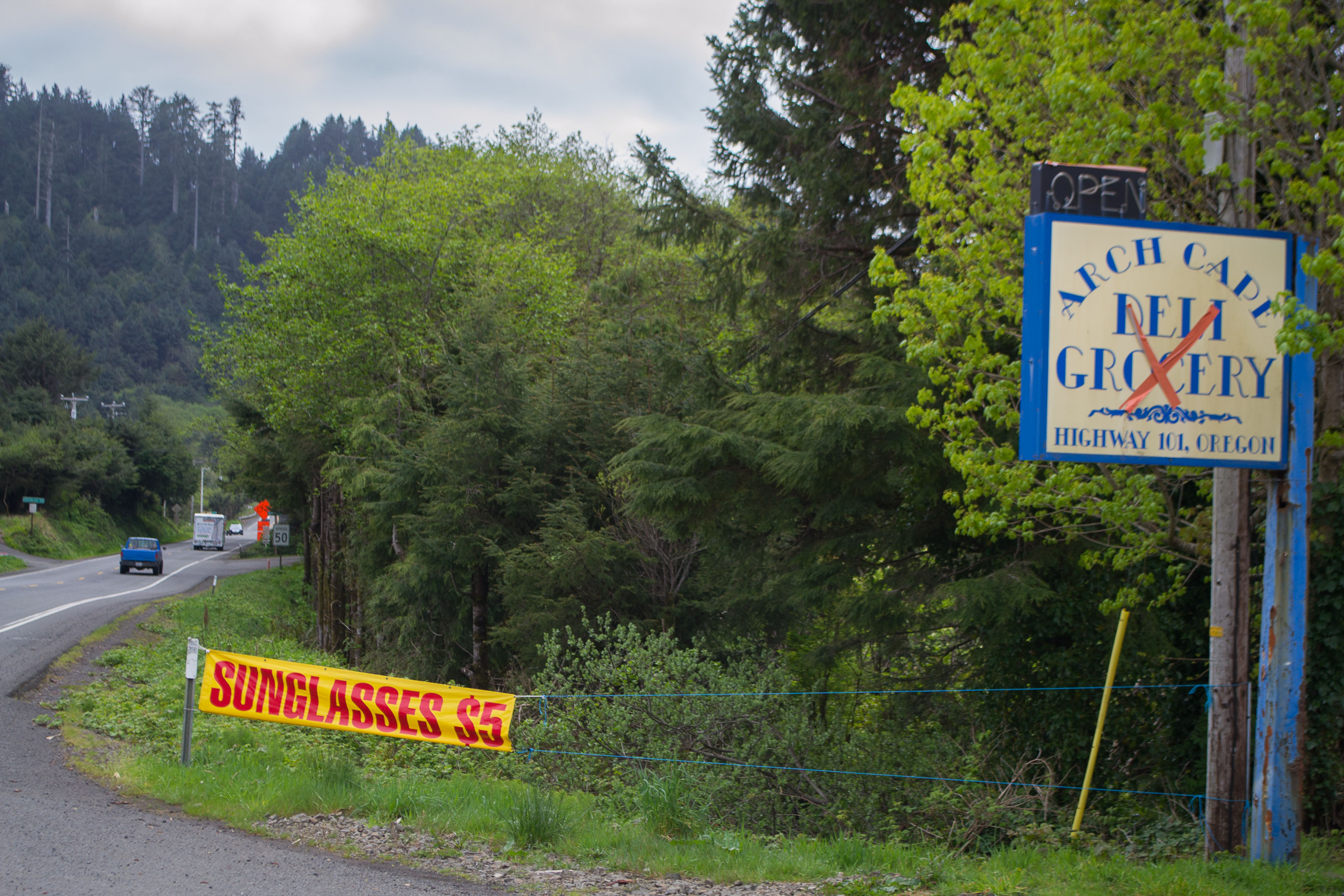
- South on Hwy 101 at Arch Cape

- Location within Oregon Location within the United States
- Coordinates: 45°49′44″N 123°57′44″W
- Country: United States
- State: Oregon
- County: Clatsop
- Elevation: 82 ft (25 m)

Population (2015)
  - Total: 900
- Time zone: UTC-8 (Pacific (PST))
  - Summer (DST): UTC-7 (PDT)
- ZIP code: 97102
- Area codes: 503 & 971
- GNIS feature ID: 1117030

Arch Cape is an unincorporated community in Clatsop County, Oregon, United States. Named for the natural arch in the coastal rocks and the headland (cape) that extends into the Pacific Ocean, it is located along the Pacific coast, approximately four miles south of Cannon Beach, between Hug Point State Recreation Site to the north and Oswald West State Park to the south.

== History ==
According to The Oregon Companion by Richard H. Engeman, Arch Cape in 1912 was a "remote hamlet...at the end of a wagon road from Seaside, Oregon."

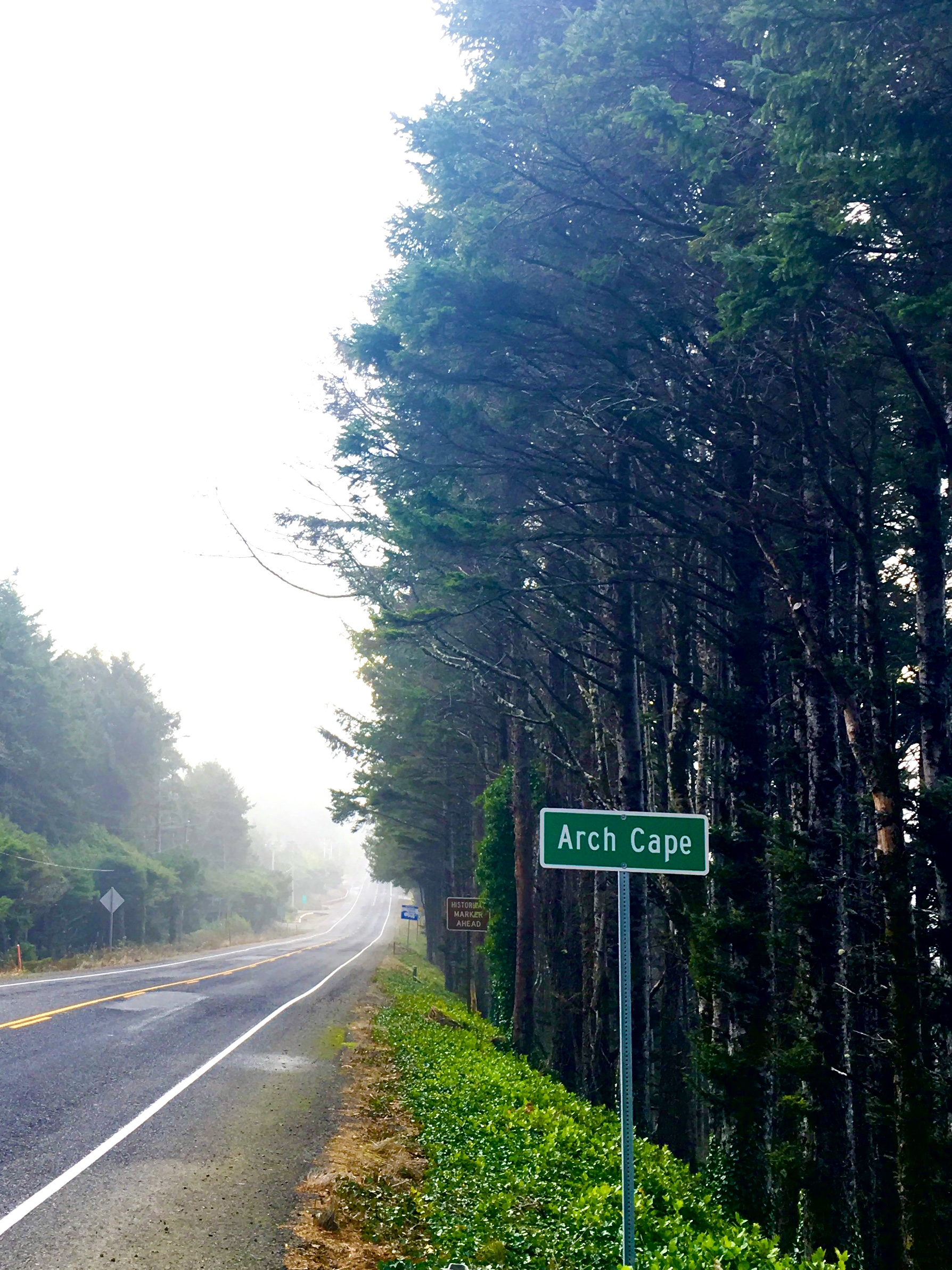

Prior to 1938, U.S. Route 101 in Oregon (Oregon Coast Highway), which was completed in 1936, ended at Arch Cape, just south of Arch Cape Creek. In February 1936, the Oregon State Highway Commission began work on a 1,228-foot tunnel through the Arch Cape headland. According to the July 1937 issue of Western Construction News, at the time, it was the longest tunnel on the Oregon highway system. Work was completed in March 1940.

In 1939, just prior to the opening of the tunnel, Ernest White built a three-room home that later served as the Arch Cape post office and general store. In the 1960s, the building was expanded and converted into the Inn at Arch Cape, which remains today.

Before U.S. Route 101 was built, the only way to reach Arch Cape from Cannon Beach was to venture around Hug Point, traveling along the beach at low tide. According to the January 8, 1910, edition of The Club Journal, "Only at low tide is it possible to get around this point in an automobile."

According to the book Images of Cannon Beach by Deborah Coyle, an Arch Cape post office was established in 1891, with weekly mail delivery by foot or horseback until 1912, when train service began. The post office, which was inside the Austin House, a hotel/general store about a quarter mile south of Hug Point in north Arch Cape, operated there until 1901 when a new post office was opened near Elk Creek in present-day Cannon Beach. As described by authors David and Alma English in their book Arch Cape Chronicles, about 10 years later, a post office for Arch Cape opened in the Arch Cape Hotel in south Arch Cape near Arch Cape Creek. In the 1940s and '50s, Ernest White's former beach house (the present day Inn at Arch Cape) served as the post office and general store for the community. White's mother, Mrs. Ross White, along with Maxine Smith, and Ethel LeGault, ran the post office over the years.

A historical marker on the east side of Highway 101 at the north end of Arch Cape describes the wreck of the USS Shark (1821) in 1846. Three of the ship's cannons washed ashore on the beaches of Arch Cape. According to John Piatt, former president of the Arch Cape-Falcon Cove Beach Community Club, which helped fund the project, the historical marker "tells how a piece of the shipwrecked schooner, the Shark, with three small cannons, ended up on the beach in Arch Cape and how they were eventually found. It also explains that Arch Cape was once named 'Cannon Beach,' changed its name, and later the community of Ecola to the north renamed their town Cannon Beach."

== Demographics ==
The 2000 United States census showed that Arch Cape had a population of 205. However, according to the 2015 Arch Cape Domestic Water Supply District Water Management and Conservation Plan, in the summer months, Arch Cape's population is closer to 900.

== Geography ==
According to the 2007 Clatsop County Comprehensive Plan, the Arch Cape headland "represents an important scenic landmark for the community, the region and the State." The northern border of the Cape Falcon Marine Reserve sits just south of the Arch Cape headland.

Castle Rock, a large castle-shaped monolith formed by lava flows millions of years ago, sits just off the coast of Arch Cape. According to the Oregon Ocean Resources Management Task Force (1991), "In 1988, more than 10,000 common murres were recorded nesting here in addition to 4 other species of marine birds. This site also serves as a roosting area for [the] endangered brown pelican."

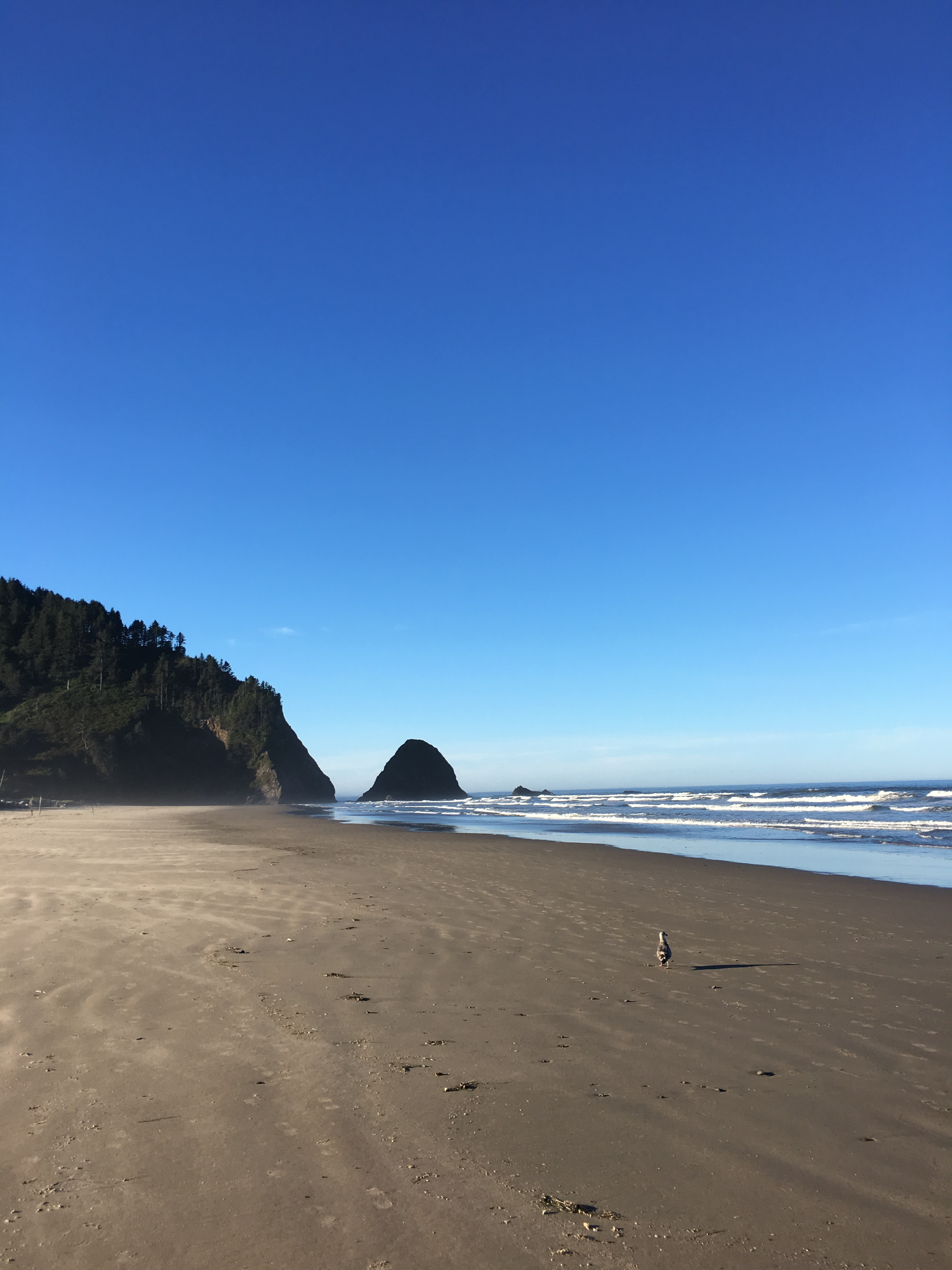

In the second edition of her book Day Hiking: Oregon Coast (2015), author Bonnie Henderson points out that "the longest unbroken forested stretch of the Oregon Coast Trail (about 8 miles) runs from Arch Cape to Neahkahnie Mountain" to the south. With a trailhead off Shingle Mill Lane at Arch Cape Creek, the Arch Cape Trail is the longest hiking trail in Oswald West State Park (6.3 miles).

In 2008, winter storms uncovered a rare "ghost forest" on the Arch Cape beach. Previously covered by deep sand, the giant tree stumps are estimated to be at least 4,000 years old.

=== Climate ===
As part of the North Oregon Coast region, Arch Cape has mild, dry summers, with no average monthly temperatures above 71.6 °F (22.0 °C) and is classified by the Köppen Climate Classification system as a "warm-summer Mediterranean climate" (also called "Cool-summer Mediterranean climate"), a subtype of the Mediterranean climate, a less common form of the Mediterranean climate.

This region experiences comfortable, generally dry summers, with no average monthly temperatures above 72 °F during the summer months. Winters in the region are rainy and generally mild, though Arch Cape and surrounding areas get occasional snowfall.

According to a 1974 report titled "An Environmental Plan of Southwest Clatsop County" (Morgan & McKey, Western Interstate Commission for Higher Education, Boulder, Colo.), temperatures in the area are "remarkably stable throughout the year. Mean temperatures will vary perhaps only 20 degrees between August and January." According to the same report, "Heavy fogs form easily [in the area] whenever warm, moist air moves over the colder ocean. Thus the area between the Pacific Ocean and the summit of the [Oregon] Coast Range is known as the fog belt."

According to IQAIR Arch Cape has the cleanest air in the world.

Arch Cape, Oregon

Climate chart (precipitation, max. and min. temperature)
| J | F | M | A | M | J | J | A | S | O | N | D |
| 10 38 52 | 8 38 53 | 8.2 39 55 | 5.8 41 57 | 3.8 45 60 | 2.6 50 63 | 1.3 52 66 | 1.2 53 67 | 2.7 49 68 | 5.8 45 63 | 11 41 55 | 11 38 51 |
- █ Average max. and min. temperatures in °F
- █ Precipitation totals in inches
- Source: NOAA
Metric conversion
| J | F | M | A | M | J | J | A | S | O | N | D |
| 259 3 11 | 203 3 12 | 208 4 13 | 147 5 14 | 97 7 16 | 66 10 17 | 33 11 19 | 30 12 19 | 69 9 20 | 147 7 17 | 272 5 13 | 277 3 11 |
- █ Average max. and min. temperatures in °C
- █ Precipitation totals in mm

== Infrastructure and economy ==
While Arch Cape has no retail stores or restaurants, it includes a Catholic church and three small hotels. Part of the Cannon Beach Rural Fire Protection District, Arch Cape also has a fire station.

A large shingle mill operated along Arch Cape Creek from the 1940s until July 1967 when it burned down. In their book Arch Cape Chronicles, authors David and Alma English assert that the shingle mill "had an enormous impact on this area since it was...a large operation [that] employed 40 men at one time." Today, the Arch Cape Water and Sanitary Districts operate near the site of the old mill.

In September 2017, Arch Cape was recognized by the Oregon Water Resources Department for its water conservation program. That same year, the Oregon Department of Forestry’s State Forest Stewardship Coordinating Committee recommended that the United States Forest Service consider a request from the Arch Cape Water District and North Coast Land Conservancy for $4.5 million to help acquire the watershed that provides Arch Cape's water. Once acquired, the land would serve as a 2100-acre community forest.
