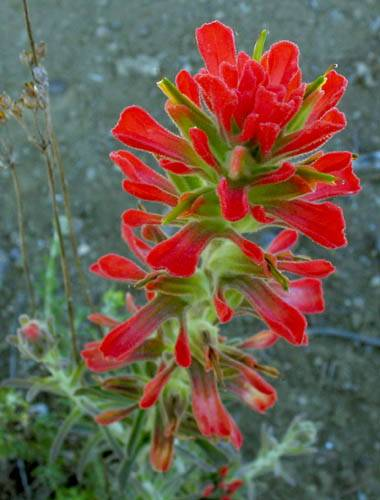

Scientific classification
- Kingdom: Plantae
- Clade: Tracheophytes
- Clade: Angiosperms
- Clade: Eudicots
- Clade: Asterids
- Order: Lamiales
- Family: Orobanchaceae
- Genus: Castilleja
- Species: C. foliolosa

Binomial name
- Castilleja foliolosa Hook. & Arn.

= Castilleja foliolosa =

Species of flowering plant

Castilleja foliolosa is a species of paintbrush, known by the common names felt paintbrush and chaparral paintbrush.

It is native to California and northern Baja California, where it grows in chaparral and rocky desert and mountain slopes.

== Description ==
Castilleja foliolosa is a perennial wildflower that grows up to 60 centimeters tall and is coated in woolly white or gray branching hairs. The leaves are linear in shape and up to 5 centimeters long.

The inflorescence is made up of layers of bracts tipped in bright orange-red to dull yellowish green. Between the colorful bracts appear the nondescript flowers, which are greenish in color and pouch-shaped. The fruit is a capsule just over a centimeter long.

=== Names ===
Castilleja foliolosa is known in English by the common names of "felt paintbrush", "chaparral paintbrush", or "wooly painted-cup". It is also called "wooly paintbrush", however it shares this name with the species Castilleja lanata.
