= Bruno de Heceta =

Spanish explorer (1743–1807)

Bruno de Heceta y Dudagoitia
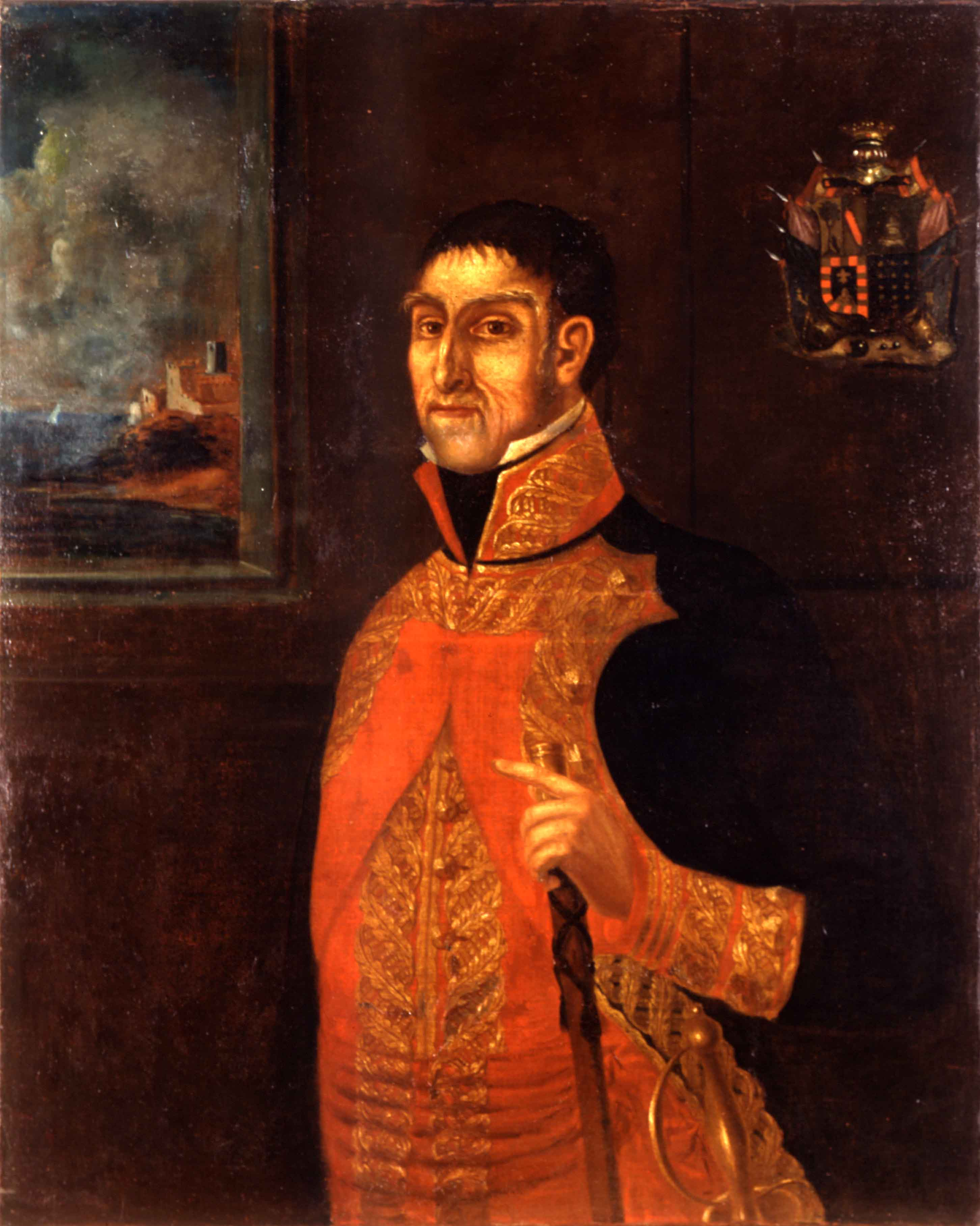
- Portrait, c. 1785
- Born: 1 March 1743; Bilbao, Basque Country, Spain
- Died: 16 August 1807 (aged 64); Málaga, Andalusia, Spain
- Military career
- Allegiance: Spain
- Branch: Spanish Navy
- Rank: Vice Admiral

Bruno de Heceta (Hezeta) y Dudagoitia (1743–1807) was a Spanish explorer of the Pacific Northwest. Born in Bilbao of an old Basque family, he was sent by the viceroy of New Spain, Antonio María Bucareli y Ursúa, to explore the area north of Alta California in response to information that there were colonial Russian settlements there.

== Background ==
The Spanish claim to Alaska and the Pacific Northwest dated back to the 1493 papal bull (Inter caetera) and rights contained in the 1494 Treaty of Tordesillas. These two formal acts formed the basis of Spain's claim of the exclusive right to colonise all of the Western Hemisphere (excluding present-day Brazil), including all of the west coast of North America. The first European expedition to actually reach the Pacific coast was led by the Spaniard Vasco Núñez de Balboa, which reached the western coast of present-day Panama in 1513. Balboa claimed the Pacific Ocean for the Spanish Crown, as well as all the lands touching it. This action of Balboa further solidified the Spanish claim of exclusive control over the entire west coast of North America.

Confident of their claims, the Spanish Empire did not explore or settle the northwest coast of North America in the 250 years after Balboa's claim. By the late 18th century, however, learning of Russian and British arrivals along the Pacific Northwest and Alaskan coasts, Spain finally grew sufficiently concerned about their claims to the region and set out to determine the extent of any Russian or British encroachment.

== Pacific expedition ==
A first expedition led by Juan José Pérez Hernández in 1774 with just one ship, the frigate Santiago (alias Nueva Galicia), did not reach as far north as planned. Thus, in 1775, when a small group of officers from Spain reached the Pacific port of San Blas in the Viceroyalty of New Spain (present-day Mexico), the viceroy placed one of them, Bruno de Heceta, in charge of a second expedition. This expedition was to have two ships, with the second a smaller ship that could explore in shallower waters.

Heceta was given command of the Santiago. Accompanying Heceta was the schooner Sonora (alias Felicidad, also known as Nuestra Señora de Guadalupe) initially under the command of Juan Manuel de Ayala. The 36-foot-long (11 m) Sonora, with a crew of 16, was to perform coastal reconnaissance and mapping, and could make landfall in places the larger Santiago was unable to approach on its previous voyage. In this way, the expedition could officially lay claim to the lands of northern New Spain it visited.

The two ships sailed together as far north as Punta de los Martires (or "Point of the Martyrs"), present day Point Grenville in the U.S. state of Washington, named by Heceta in response to an attack by the local Quinault Native Americans.

By design, the vessels parted company on the evening of 30 July 1775, with the Santiago continuing north, to what is today the border between Washington and British Columbia, Canada. The Sonora, with second officer Juan Francisco de la Bodega y Quadra at the helm, following its orders continuing further north up the coast, ultimately reaching 56°08´N on 15 August 1775, sighting Kruzof Island at the entrance to Sitka Sound the next morning. The sailed north and entered Sea Lion Cove on the north side of Kruzof Island, where they encountered a Tlingit house. The Spaniards performed numerous "acts of sovereignty" claiming the territory. Bodega y Quadra named the cove Puerto de Nuestra Señora de los Remedios. A group of Tlingit were seen carrying off the cross after it had been erected on shore and the crew had returned to their vessels. The mountain on Kruzof Island would be named Mount Edgecumbe three years later in 1778 by English explorer James Cook.

On his return journey south, still with only the larger Santiago and a reduced crew, Heceta discovered a large bay penetrating far inland. He was the first European to sight the mouth of the Columbia River. He tried to sail in, but the strong currents prevented it, even under a full press of sails. His crew was so reduced that they could not handle the anchor, so he could not easily wait for better conditions. He wrote that the seething currents led him to believe it was the mouth of a great river or a passage to another sea. Later, he guessed it to be the Strait of Juan de Fuca. He named the entrance bay Bahia de la Asunción and produced a map of what he could discern from outside the Columbia Bar. Later Spanish maps often showed the Columbia River's estuary with the name Entrada de Hezeta, Rio de San Roque, and other similar variants.

Throughout the voyage, the crews of both vessels endured many hardships, including food shortages and scurvy. On 8 September 1775, the ships rejoined and headed south for the return trip to San Blas.

== Later years ==
Subsequently, Heceta returned to Spain, fighting in various naval battles against France and Great Britain in Europe. He died in Málaga in 1807 with the rank of Vice Admiral.

== Legacy ==
Heceta Island in Alaska, and Heceta Head and the Heceta Head Light on the Oregon Coast, are named after him. In Oregon it is pronounced "Ha–SEE–Ta" and in Alaska it is pronounced "HECK–ah–Ta."

== See also ==
- Spanish expeditions to the Pacific Northwest

== Bibliography ==
- Hezeta, Bruno de (1985). For honor & country : the diary of Bruno de Hezeta. H. K. Beals. Portland, Or.: Western Imprints. ISBN 0-87595-120-1. OCLC 11915690.
- Martín-Merás, María Luisa. "Bruno Heceta Dudagoitia y de Fontecha". Real Academia de la Historia (in Spanish).
- Pethick, Derek (1976). First approaches to the Northwest coast. Vancouver, B.C.: J.J. Douglas. ISBN 0-88894-056-4. OCLC 2686027.
- Tovell, Freeman M. (1995). "The Hezeta-Bodega Voyage of 1775: Its Significance for Spain's Presence in the Pacific Northwest". Terrae Incognitae. 27 (1): 57–65. doi:10.1179/tin.1995.27.1.57. ISSN 0082-2884.
- Tovell, Freeman (2008). At the Far Reaches of Empire: the life of Juan Francisco de la Bodega y Quadra. Vancouver: UBC Press. ISBN 978-0-7748-5595-2.
