= Santa Rosa (steamship) =

American steamship

The Santa Rosa was an U.S. steamship that sunk off the California coast on July 8, 1911. 192 people survived, out of about 200 people who had been on board.
