= Heceta Head =

Coastal headland in Oregon, United States

Coordinates: 44.13889°N 124.12639°W

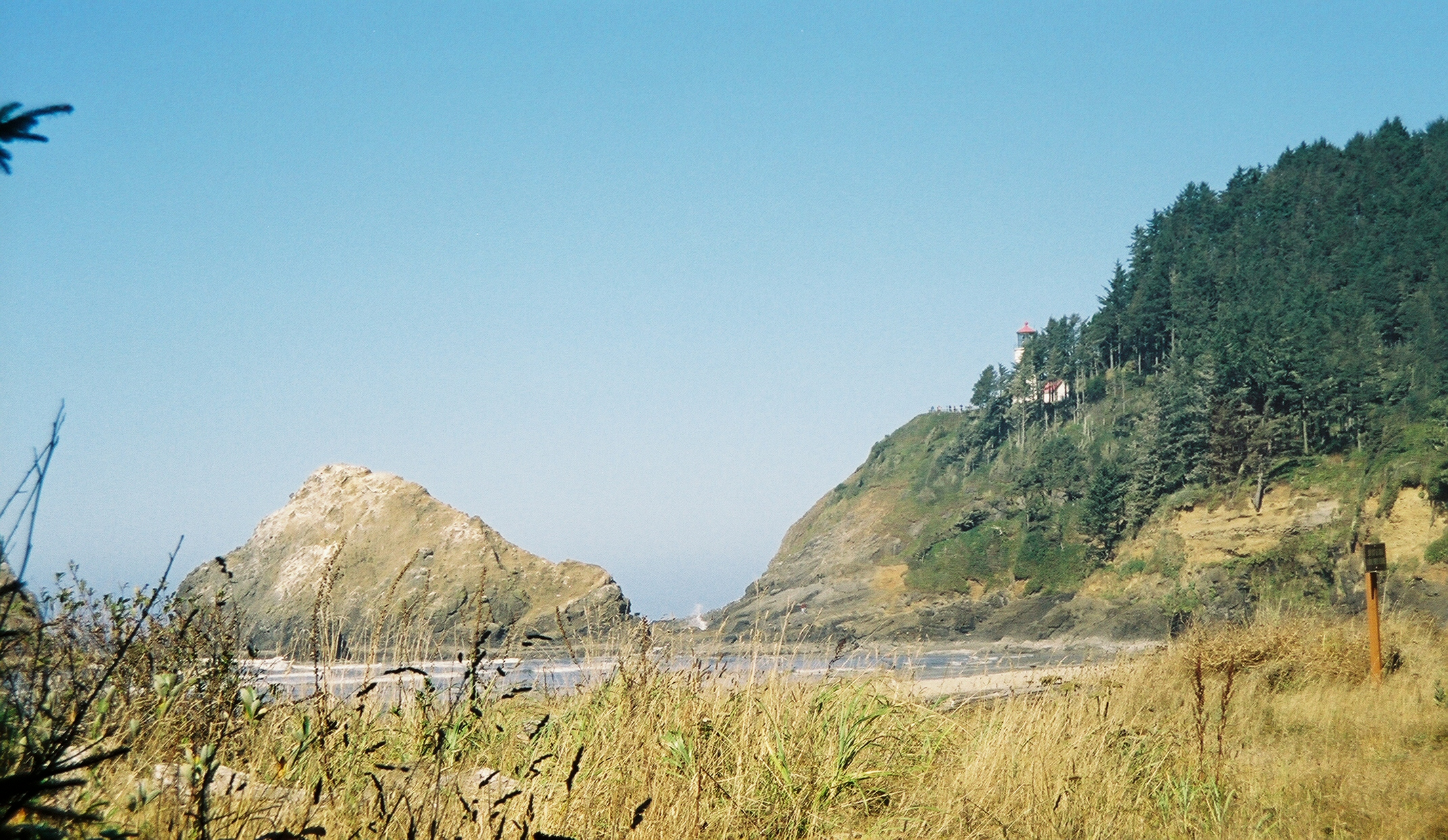
Heceta Head and lighthouse surrounded by salal meadows, rhododendrons and Sitka spruce groves, with Parrot Rock to the left

Heceta Head (/həˈsiːtə/ hə-SEE-tə) is a headland that stands 1,000 feet (300 m) above the Pacific Ocean in Lane County, Oregon, United States. The Heceta Head Light is located on its south side. Heceta Head is named after a Basque explorer under Spanish commission, Bruno de Heceta, who explored the Pacific Northwest in the 1770s. The headland marks the end of a lower-lying stretch of the coastline to the south dominated by sand dunes; the coastline to the north is more varied. Devils Elbow is the bay south of the headland at the mouth of Cape Creek, and with the headland formed Devils Elbow State Park, which is now part of Heceta Head Lighthouse State Scenic Viewpoint.

== Historic structures ==
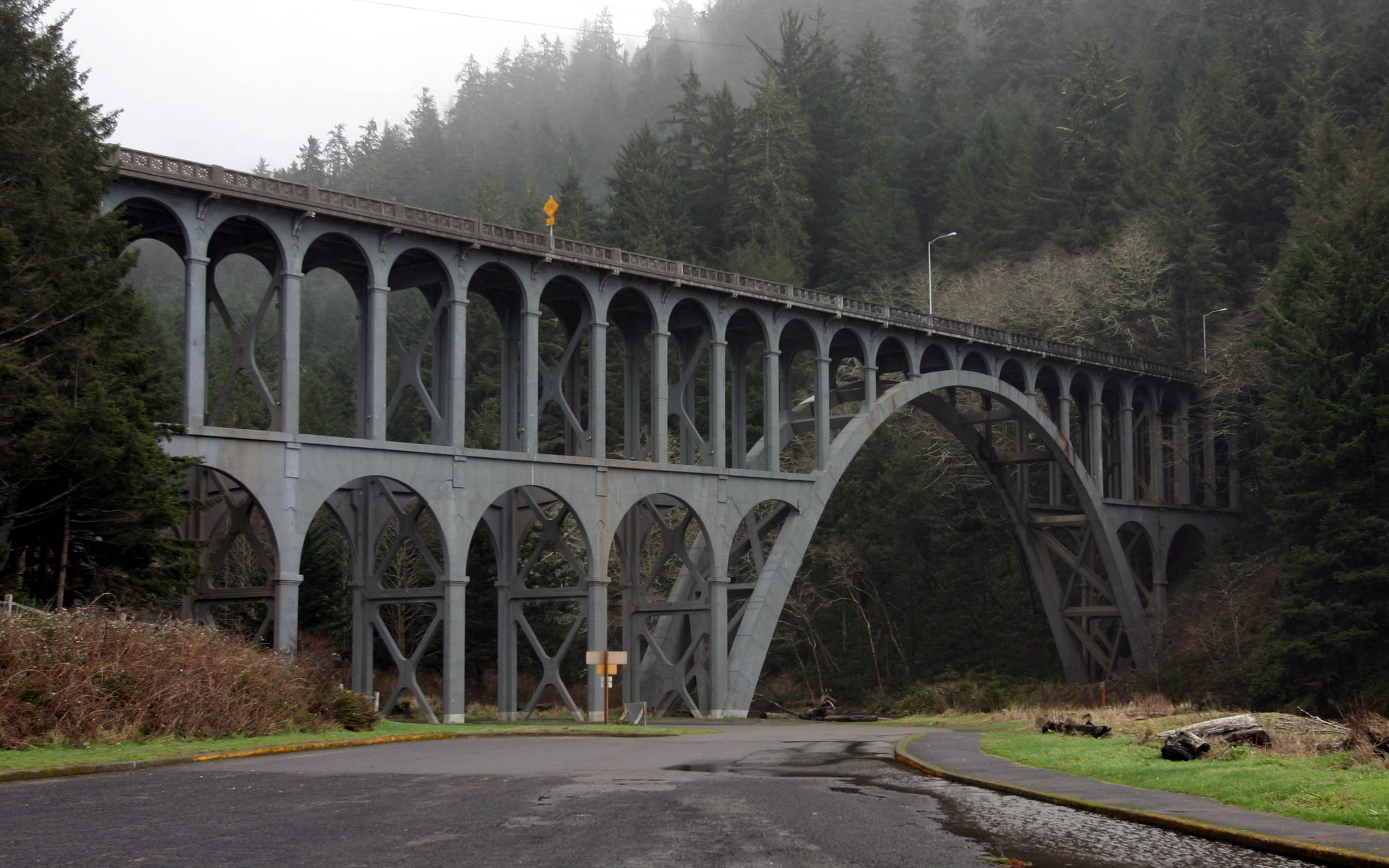
Cape Creek Bridge, at the heart of Heceta Head Lighthouse Scenic Viewpoint, is the first bridge in the world to have zinc thermal sprayed over the entire structure.

Heceta Head Light, the assistant lightkeepers’ house, and two bridges located near the headland are listed on the National Register of Historic Places. Big Creek Bridge brings U.S. Route 101 across Big Creek, about 2 miles (3 km) north of the headland. Cape Creek Bridge carries U.S. 101 across Cape Creek, just south of the headland.

Heceta Head Light, a lighthouse, is 205 feet (62 m) up the headland. Built in 1894, the 56-foot (17 m) lighthouse shines a beam visible for 21 miles (34 km) out to sea, making it the strongest light on the Oregon Coast.

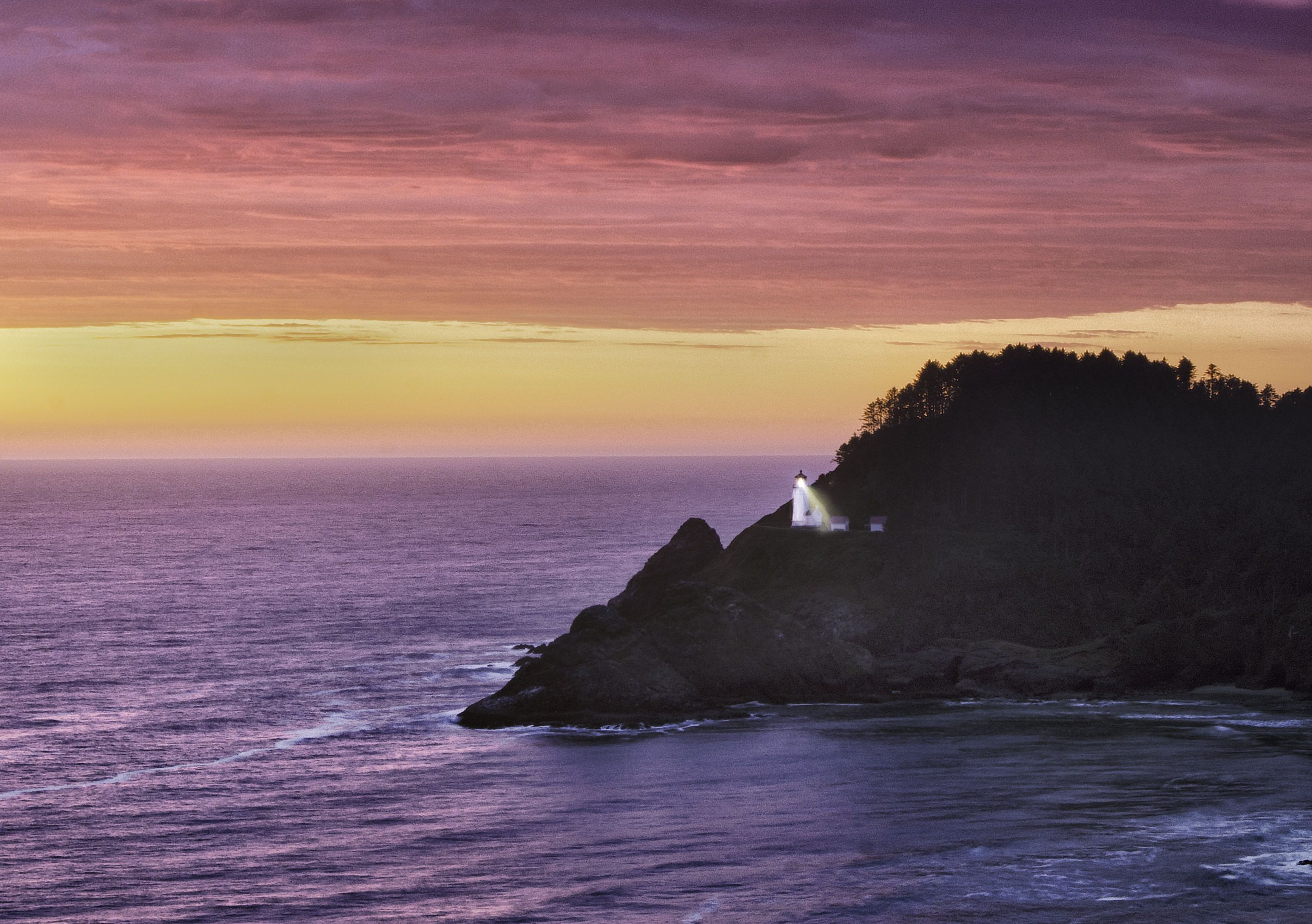
Sunset at Heceta Head

== Geology ==
Heceta Head is the ending point of an ancient lava flow from the Columbia River Basalt Group.
