= Heceta Head Light =

Lighthouse in Oregon, United States

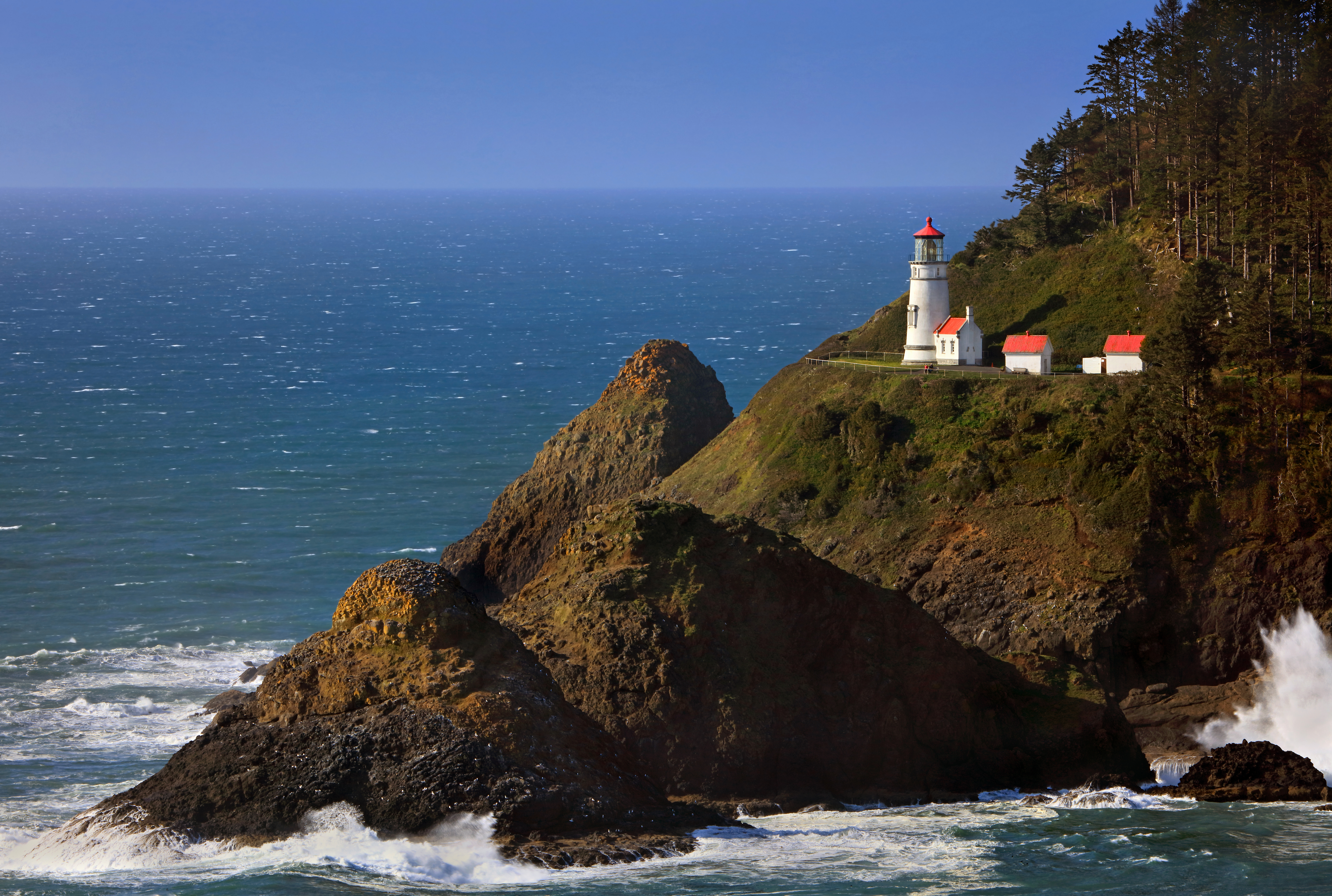
- View of Heceta Head Light showing Heceta Head
- Location: Heceta Head, Florence, Oregon
- Coordinates: 44.13737°N 124.127835°W

Tower
- Constructed: 1892
- Foundation: Natural/emplaced
- Construction: Brick/stuccoed
- Automated: 1963
- Height: 56 feet (17 m)
- Shape: Conical attached to workroom
- Heritage: National Register of Historic Places listed place

Light
- First lit: 1894
- Focal height: 205 feet (62 m)
- Lens: First order Fresnel lens
- Range: 21 nautical miles (39 km; 24 mi)
- Characteristic: Flash white, 10 seconds
- Heceta Head Lighthouse and Keeper's Quarters
- U.S. National Register of Historic Places
- Nearest city: Florence, Oregon
- Area: 3.5 acres (1.4 ha)
- Built by: United States Coast Guard
- NRHP reference No.: 78002296
- Added to NRHP: November 28, 1978

Heceta Head Light is a lighthouse on the Oregon Coast 13 miles (21 km) north of Florence, and 13 miles (21 km) south of Yachats in the United States. It is located at Heceta Head Lighthouse State Scenic Viewpoint, a state park, midway up a 205-foot-tall (62 m) headland. Built in 1894, the 56-foot (17 m)-tall lighthouse shines a beam visible for 21 nautical miles (39 kilometres; 24 miles), making it the strongest light on the Oregon Coast.

The light is maintained by the Oregon Parks and Recreation Department (OPRD). At the same time, the assistant lighthouse keepers' house, operated as a bed-and-breakfast inn, is maintained by the U.S. Forest Service. The lighthouse is 2 miles (3 km) from Sea Lion Caves.

== History and construction ==
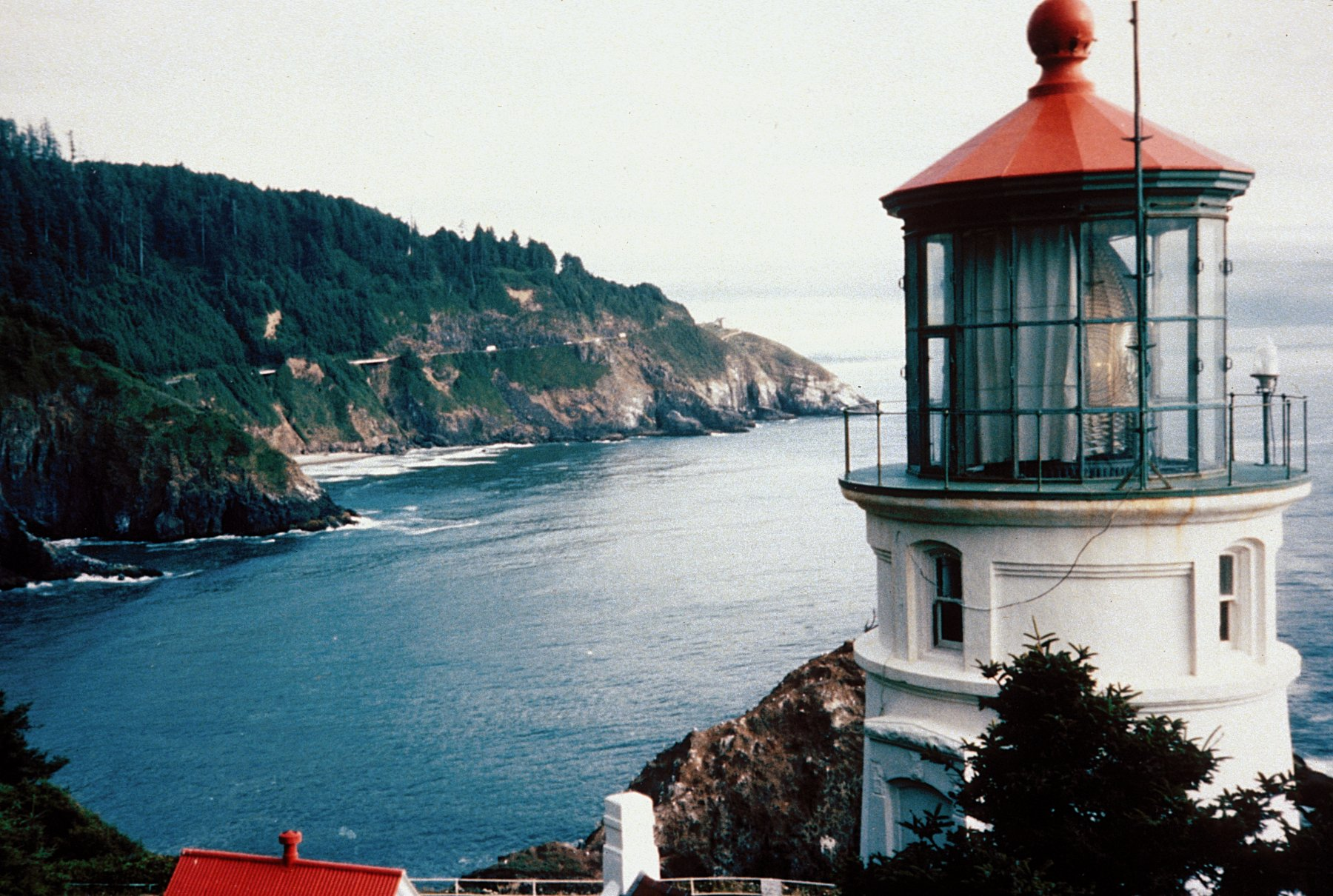
Closeup view of the Heceta Head Light tower

Heceta Head is named after the Spanish explorer Bruno de Heceta, who explored the Pacific Northwest during the late 18th century. Before him, Heceta Head was a spot of frequent fishing and hunting by the American Indian tribes that populated the area. Heceta Head is part of the Siuslaw traditional lands, known in their language as ɫtúwɪs. They hunted sea lions in the area and gathered seabird eggs from the offshore rocks. It was also the site of a legend—the Animal People built a great stone wall, which is now the cliffs. They tricked the Grizzly Bear brothers to their deaths there. In 1888, white settlers moved into the area and claimed 164 acres (66 ha) of the surrounding land. That same year, the United States Lighthouse Service approved construction of the lighthouse, and the government bought 19 acres (7.7 ha) of the 164 acres (66 ha) previously purchased for the lighthouse structures.

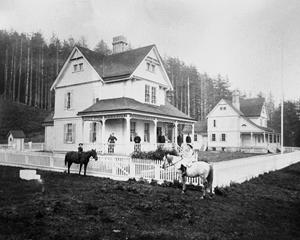
The lightkeepers' houses, circa 1900. The house on the left was razed in 1940.

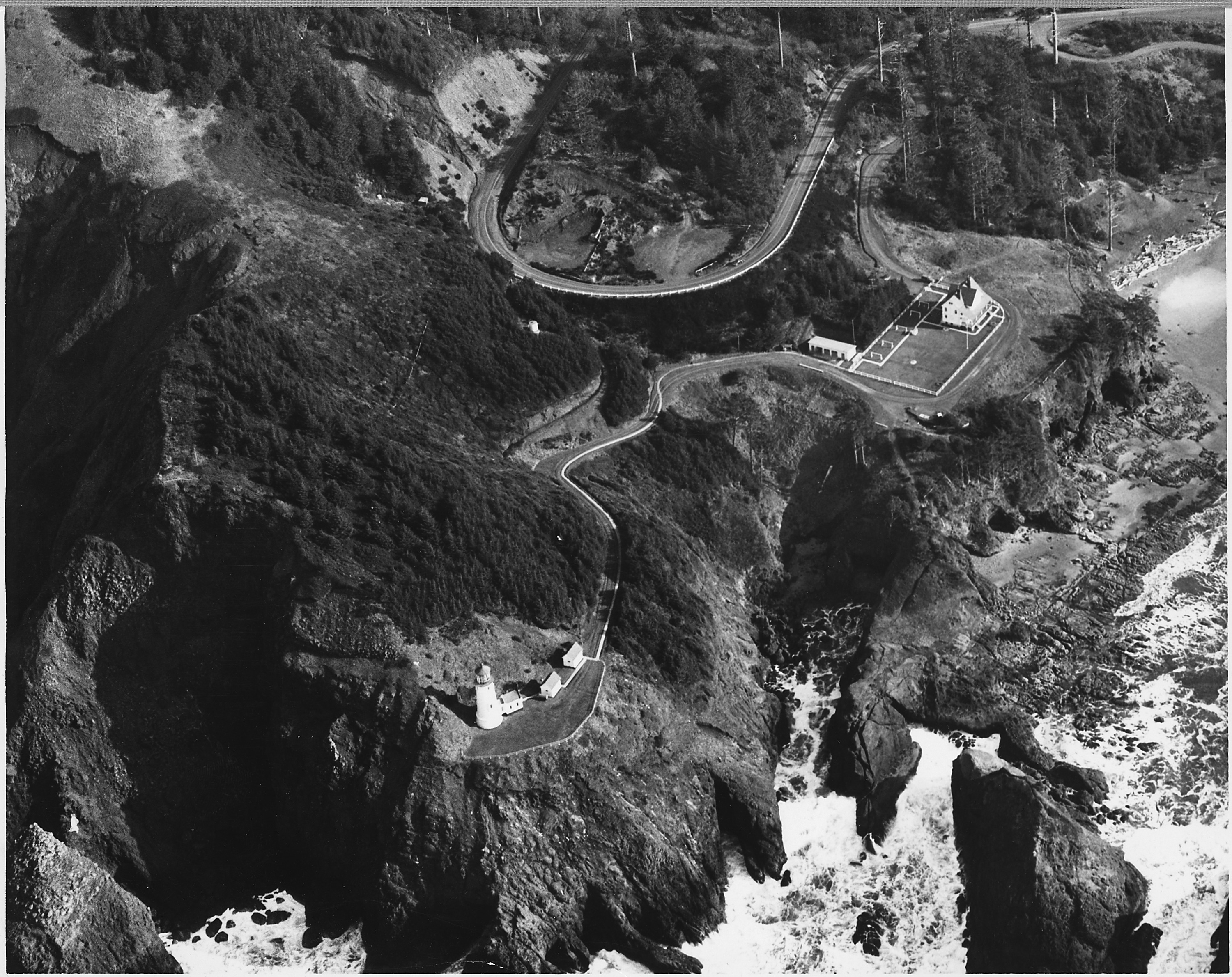
Aerial view, 1954

In 1892, a crew of 56 began construction on the site. Because of the site's seclusion, building materials were either shipped in, if the weather and tide permitted, or brought from Florence by wagon, the latter usually taking four to five hours. Stones were brought from the Clackamas River, and bricks came from San Francisco. The lens system was made by Chance Brothers and used a Fresnel lens that remained in use into the 21st century.

Completed in August 1893, the entire project cost $80,000 and consisted of:

- The lighthouse
- Houses for the head lightkeeper, the two assistant lightkeepers, and their families
- A barn
- Two kerosene oil storage buildings—if one had caught fire, there was a secondary source

Heceta Head Light and Keepers Quarters was placed on the National Register of Historic Places in 1978 for its architectural and engineering significance. The site originally included several other buildings—farm buildings and the single-family head lighthouse keeper's house, which was demolished in 1940. It was very similar in size and design to the remaining house. After electricity was installed in the lighthouse buildings, the position of head lighthouse keeper was no longer needed. The lighthouse keeper's house was sold for $10 and dismantled for its lumber, which was used to build Alpha Bit bookstore-cafe in Mapleton, which would still be there into the 21st century. The remaining keepers' house was a duplex that housed the first and second assistant lighthouse keepers and their families. After the light was automated in 1963, the last keepers moved away, and the remaining house was leased to Lane Community College by the U.S. Forest Service in 1970, which had taken over management of the building. The porch of the Queen Anne–style house underwent restoration in 1981.

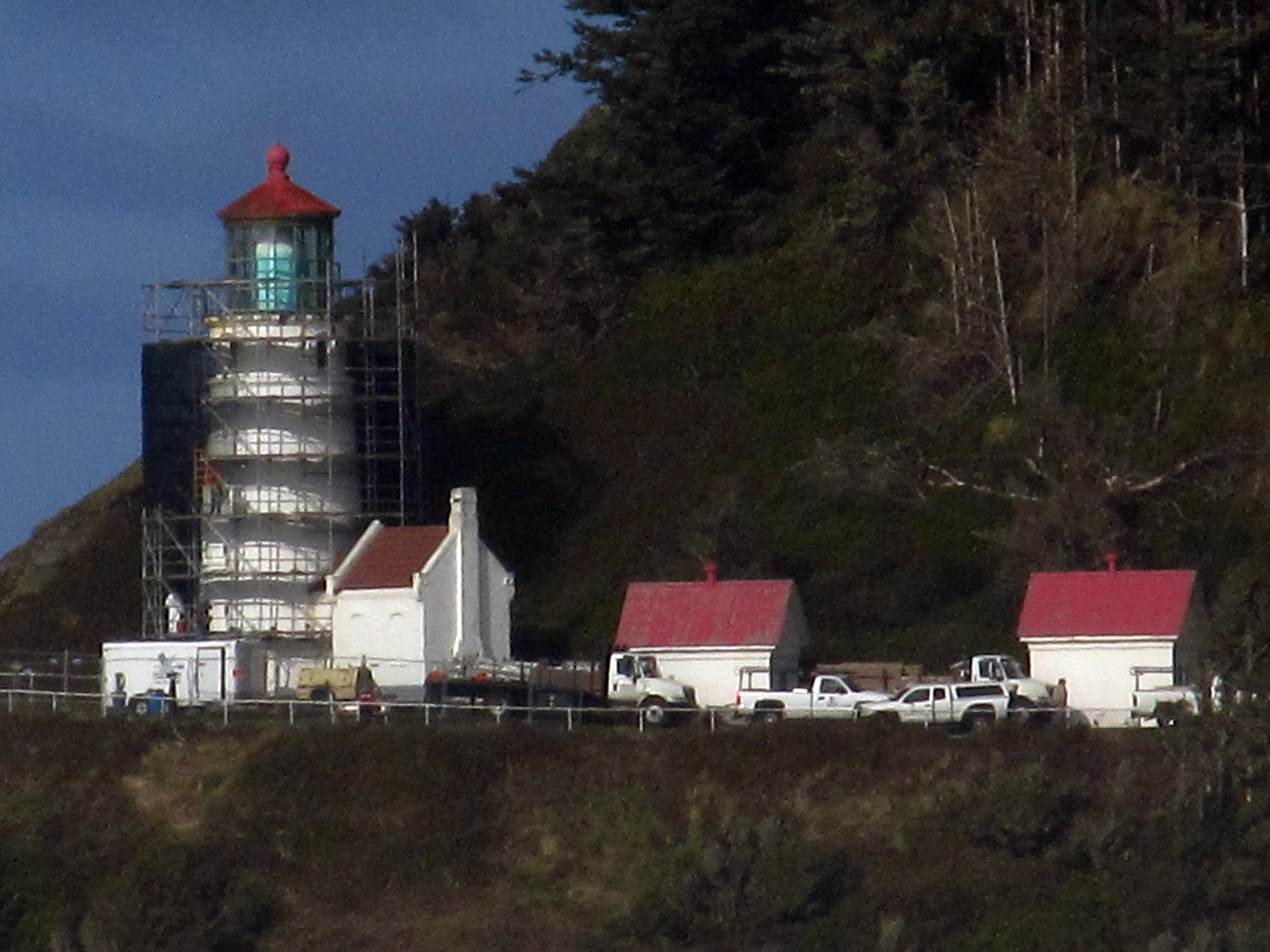
Restoring the lighthouse, February 2012

The Heceta Head Lighthouse was closed to the public in August 2011 for restoration and repairs. Under the supervision of OPRD preservation architect Sue Licht, a team of more than 100 subcontractors and craftsmen, the majority of whom were from Oregon, removed cement stucco that had sealed in moisture, allowing the lighthouse to air out in the damp coastal environment. They also replaced and restored the tower's historic metalwork and masonry, installed new windows, and repaired the lens's rotating mechanism. The interior and exterior of the lighthouse were repainted, and the original wood floor of the workroom was uncovered and reconditioned. The lighthouse has been returned as much as possible to the way it would have looked in 1894. When restoration work was completed, it reopened on June 8, 2013, after being closed for 2 years. That day, the OPRD welcomed nearly 100 supporters to Heceta Head State Scenic Viewpoint to celebrate the reopening.

== See also ==
- List of lighthouses in Oregon
- List of Oregon state parks
