= Sunset Bay =

Sunset Bay may refer to:

== Canada ==
- Sunset Bay, Alberta, a community in Lac La Biche County
- Sunset Bay Estates, Ontario, in the township of Tiny

== United States ==
- Sunset Bay, New York, a census-designated place
- Sunset Bay State Park, Oregon
