= T. J. Stevenson & Company, Inc. =

Former US Shipping Company

- Industry: Transportation and shipping
- Founded: 1935 in New York City
- Key people: Thomas J. Stevenson; Thomas J. Stevenson Jr.; Kenneth H. Stevenson; George F. Wood; Sidney H. Schell

T. J. Stevenson & Company, Inc. was a shipping firm founded in New York City by Thomas J. Stevenson on December 2, 1935. In 1920 Thomas J. Stevenson started working as a ship broker in New York City. Thomas J. Stevenson's father Henery Stevenson worked as a clerk at a shipping firm in New York City starting in 1910. T. J. Stevenson & Company supported the World War II effort by operating United States owned ships. After the war T. J. Stevenson & Company purchased surplus war cargo ships. Thomas J. Stevenson was born in 1892 and died on January 28, 1968.

== World War II ==
T. J. Stevenson & Company ships were used to help the World War II effort. During World War II T. J. Stevenson & Company operated Merchant navy ships for the United States Shipping Board. During World War II T. J. Stevenson & Company was active with charter shipping with the Maritime Commission and War Shipping Administration. T. J. Stevenson & Company operated Liberty ships and Victory ships for the merchant navy. The ship was run by its T. J. Stevenson & Company crew and the US Navy supplied United States Navy Armed Guards to man the deck guns and radio.

== Ships ==
- Ships owned:
- USS Valencia (AKA-81) purchased in 1947 and renamed Garden City.
- SS Raymond Clapper, Liberty ship purchased in 1947. Sold in 1954 and renamed Shamrock, sold in 1954 renamed Master Nicky, sold 1960 renamed Thryols, 1965 sold renamed Elias Dayfas II, on July 5, 1966, started leaking, abandoned off Yucatán Peninsula, towed to be scrap but sank.
- SS George S. Boutwell, Liberty ship built in 1943, purchased in 1955 and renamed Rayvah. During war operated by Alaska Packers' Association, then in 1947 Sudden & Christenson, then in by Blidberg Rothchild Co, then in 1952 by Orion Shipping renamed Seaglider. In 1957 sold to Ships & Freighters, in 1961 renamed Cara Seam, in 1962 renamed Diana B., scrapped in 1964 in Portland.
- SS George W. Kendall, built in 1943, a Liberty Tanker, purchased 1948 and renamed Dorothy Stevenson. During war operated by American Republics Corporation. Sold in 1948 renamed Cambridge, sold in 1956 renamed Wolna Polska, sold 1961 renamed Yi Ming, in 1967 scrapped in Taiwan.
- USS Ibex (IX-119), SS Nicholas Longworth Armadillo-class tanker built in 1943, purchased in 1948 and renamed Helen Stevenson.
- Alpha Carl R. Gray, Liberty Tanker built in 1943, purchased in 1948 and renamed Alpha. During war was US Navy tanker USS Gemsbok (IX-117). The USS Gemsbok after the war in 1946 was renamed in Carl R. Gray. Sold in 1951 renamed Stathday, sold 1955 renamed Columbia Trader, sold in 1963 renamed Pilot Rock. in 1966 scrapped in Portland
- William Winter, built in 1943, Liberty Tanker, during war US Navy USS Elk (IX-115), purchased in 1949 by Maris Transportation System with T.J.Stevenson & Company as operator. Other names: 1951 Seapearl, 1953 Korthi, 1957 Aandros County, 1960 Kalamas, on September 3, 190 ran ashore near Cape Arago Lighthouse, Oregon. In 1962 scrapped Oakland, California.
- SS Koloa Victory, built i 1945, During war operated by Seas Shipping Company. Sold 1948 renamed American Judge with United States Lines, sold 1956 renamed Transcape, sold 1957 Liberia firm, in 1959 rebuilt to 9,623 toms and lengthened. In 1961 sold and renamed John F. Shea with T. J. Stevenson & Co., sold in 1969 renamed Kentuckian, sold 1971 Panama firm, in 1971 scrapped in Taiwan.

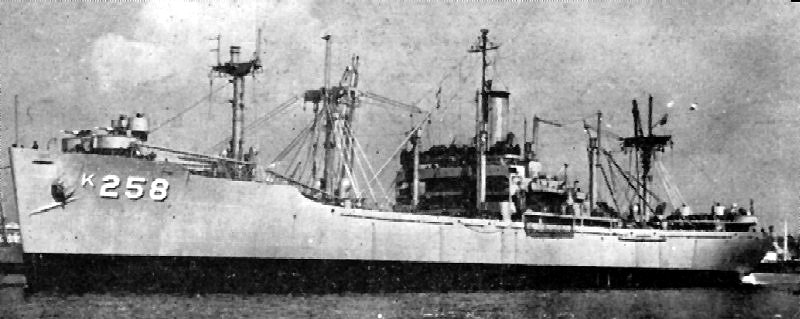
A Victory ship of World War II

Liberty ship of World War II

  - World War II operated ships:
  - Liberty Ships:
- Meyer London. built in 1944 WSA, On April 16, 1944, was torpedoed and sunk by German submarine U-407 off Libya.
- William W. Seaton
- SS William W. Loring operator in 1945 and 1946
- SS Stephen Beasley, operator from 1944 to 1948
- SS Henry Hadley, operator from 1944 to 1948
- Raymond Clapper, operator from 1944 to 1947. Sold and renamed T. J. Stevenson in honor of operator, by Ocean Freighting & Brokerage Corp. of New York
- William H. Jackson
- William H. Welch, on February 26, 1944, ran ashore in storm on Loch Ewe, Scotland, broke in two and total loss.
- Noah Brown, operated 1946 and 1947
- Edward L. Grant operated 1946 to 1948
- SS John B. Gordon, operated 1943 to 1946
- George Clement Perkins, operated 1946 and 1947
- Charles Paddock operated from 1948 to 1949
- Laura Drake Gill, operated from 1944 to 1946
- Edward W. Burton, operated from 1945 to 1948, became USS Interceptor (AGR-8) in 1956.
- Coastal Explorer operator in 1946, was USS Pipestone (AK-203)

  - Victory ships:
- East Point Victory, operated from 1945 to 1947
- M. I. T. Victory, troopship, operated from 1945 to 1947, part of Operation Magic Carpet
  - Other
  - USS Bosque (APA-135), T. J. Stevenson had her repaired in 1955.

== See also ==
- World War II United States Merchant Navy
