= USS Elk (IX-115) =

History

United States
- Name: William Winter; Elk
- Namesake: William Winter; The elk
- Launched: 6 November 1943
- Commissioned: 26 November 1943
- Decommissioned: 17 May 1946
- Fate: Reverted to the Maritime Commission

General characteristics
- Displacement: 14,500 tons
- Length: 441 ft 6 in (134.57 m)
- Beam: 56 ft 11 in (17.35 m)
- Draught: 28 ft 4 in (8.64 m)
- Speed: 10 knots
- Complement: 103 officers and men
- Armament: 1 × 5-inch 38 caliber dual purpose gun; 1 × 3 in (76 mm) gun; 8 × 20 mm cannons

USS Elk (IX-115), an Armadillo-class tanker designated an unclassified miscellaneous vessel, was the second ship of the United States Navy to be named for the elk, a large deer of the northern forests of Europe, Asia, and North America. Her keel was laid down by California Shipbuilding Corporation, in Wilmington, Los Angeles, as William Winter for the Maritime Commission. She was launched on 6 November 1943 sponsored by Mrs. H. H. Hall, delivered direct to the Navy 26 November 1943, and commissioned the same day.

Elk sailed from San Pedro, Los Angeles, on 12 January 1944 for Kwajalein where she served from 19 February to 19 April as station tanker to fuel ships in the assault and occupation of the Marshall Islands. Mooring to Majuro, she fueled combatant ships at this base until June, then carried petroleum products between Majuro, Kwajalein, and Eniwetok to support the Marianas operation. From 26 June she was based again on Majuro, providing fuel for destroyers of the Security Patrol who guarded the waters around the bypassed, enemy-held islands of Wotje, Mili, and Jaluit.

After a fueling assignment at Tarawa in September 1944, Elk reported to the advance fleet base at Ulithi on 15 October and there began the vital task of fueling the ships of the fast-moving Third Fleet and Fifth Fleet for their far-ranging air and surface strikes against Japanese bases. In April 1945 she arrived at Okinawa to fuel the destroyers of the radar picket line. When hostilities ceased, Elk was at Leyte preparing to sail with a convoy to Okinawa. In September she arrived at Sasebo, Japan, to serve in the occupation. Elk returned to the United States in early 1946, was decommissioned at Norfolk, Virginia, on 17 May 1946, and reverted to the Maritime Commission 20 May 1946. Elk received one battle star for World War II service.

== Post war ==
She was purchased in 1949 by Maris Transportation System with T. J. Stevenson & Company as the operator. In 1951 was sold and renamed Seapearl, in 1953 was sold and renamed Korthi, in 1957 was sold and renamed Aandros County, in 1960 was sold and renamed Kalamas, on Sept. 3, 190 ran ashore near Cape Arago Lighthouse, Oregon. In 1962 scrapped Oakland, California.
