= North Bend, Oregon =

- City
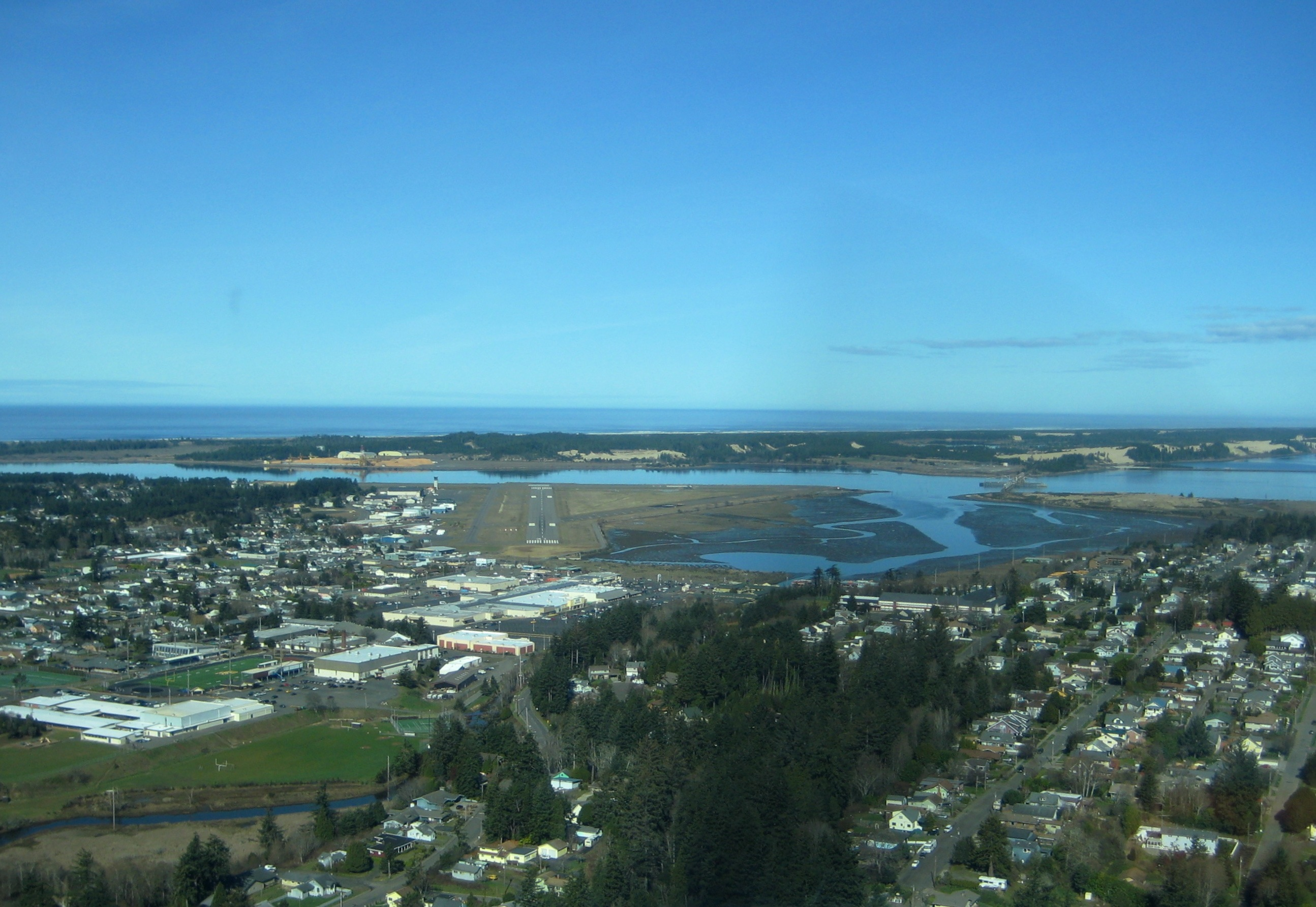
- North Bend from above, looking toward the Pacific Ocean

- Flag

- Location in Oregon
- Coordinates: 43°24′27″N 124°14′11″W
- Country: United States
- State: Oregon
- County: Coos
- Incorporated: 1903

Government
  - Mayor: Jessica Engelke

Area
  - City: 5.09 sq mi (13.19 km^{2})
  - Land: 3.93 sq mi (10.18 km^{2})
  - Water: 1.16 sq mi (3.01 km^{2})
- Elevation: 13 ft (4.0 m)

Population (2020)
  - City: 10,317
  - Density: 2,623.7/sq mi (1,013.01/km^{2})
  - Urban: 31,995
- Time zone: UTC−8 (Pacific)
  - Summer (DST): UTC−7 (Pacific)
- ZIP code: 97459
- Area code(s): 458, 541
- FIPS code: 41-53000
- GNIS feature ID: 2411269
- Website: www.northbendoregon.gov

North Bend is a city in Coos County, Oregon, United States with a population of 10,317 as of the 2020 census. North Bend is surrounded on three sides by Coos Bay, an S-shaped water inlet and estuary where the Coos River enters Coos Bay and borders the city of Coos Bay to the south. North Bend became an incorporated city in 1903.

== History ==
Before Europeans visited the Oregon coast, Native American tribes claimed the Coos Bay region as their homeland for thousands of years. Members of the Coos, Lower Umpqua, Siuslaw and Coquille tribes lived, fished, hunted and gathered along Coos Bay and its estuaries, along rivers, and in meadows and forests.

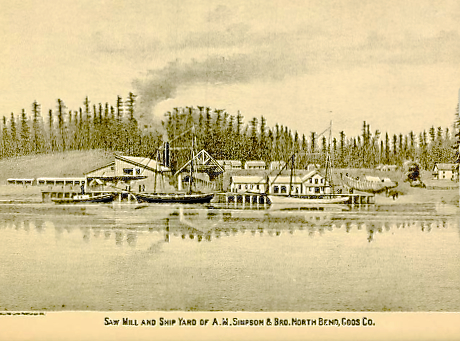
Saw mill and ship yard, North Bend, 1884 illustration

Approximately 400 years ago, British and Spanish explorers first approached the South Coast. In 1579, Sir Francis Drake is purported to have sought shelter for his ship, the Golden Hinde, around Cape Arago. Trader and explorer Jedediah Smith was in the region seeking furs and the Hudson's Bay Company sent Alexander Roderick McLeod to search for an inland passage.

The 1852 stranding of the schooner Captain Lincoln on the North Spit and the survivors' encampment and rescue brought attention to gold prospectors who came to mine placer from area beaches. In 1853, the Coos Bay Commercial Company arrived from the Rogue Valley and created routes for settlers.

Thomas Symons founded Yarrow in 1863. Louis J. Simpson bought it in 1902. Simpson brought Yarrow and his father Asa Meade Simpson's sawmill site in Old Town together in 1903 under the name North Bend.

Empire City was established and was the county seat of government until 1896. Entrepreneurs were drawn to the area's ample natural resources, and sawmills and shipyards at Old Town North Bend and Empire City spurred economic development and attracted workers. Rivers and sloughs provided a means to transport people, forest, agricultural and coal products, and towns provided hubs for inland transportation. Some of the early industries in the area included timber harvesting, shipbuilding, farming, coal mining and salmon canning.

Prior to around 1915, the Coos region was largely isolated from the rest of Oregon due to difficulties in crossing the Coast Range and fording rivers. Instead, the Pacific Ocean was used to link people to other areas, including San Francisco. That was an easier two-day trip compared to traveling inland over rugged terrain. In 1916, trains linked the region to other interior settlements and towns, increasing commercial trade and tourism

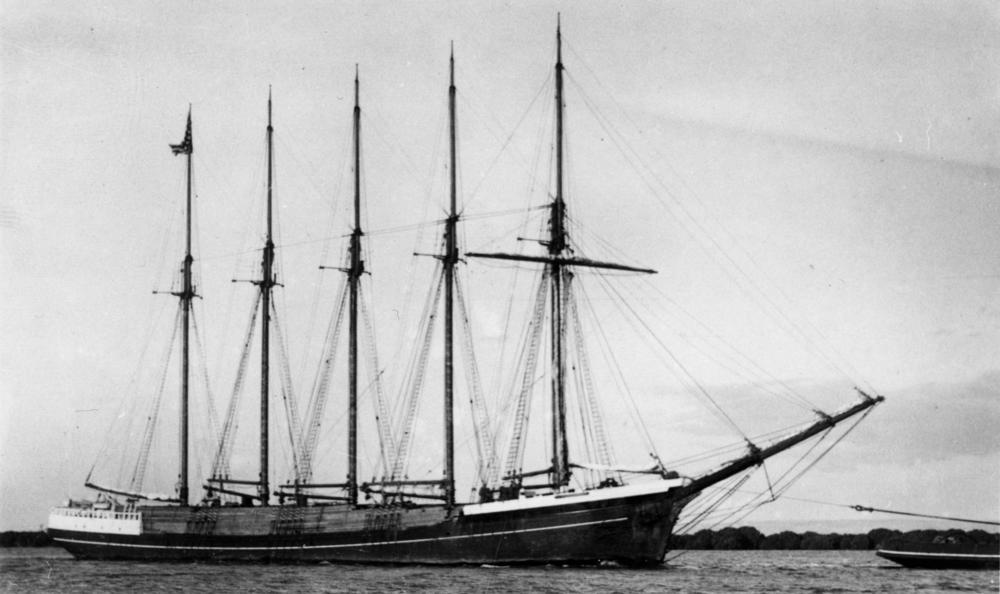
Schooner K.V. Kruse, built in 1920 by Kruse and Banks in North Bend

Significant urban growth occurred in the 1920s, and during the 1930s to 1950s, large-scale growth occurred. Per the Oregon Bay Area Chamber of Commerce, during the 1930s to 1950s:

Shipyards contracted with the U.S. Government to build minesweepers and rescue tugs for World War II defense purposes. Large national lumber companies set up operations and expanded significantly for the next two decades. Jetty improvements, commercial fishing and crabbing shaped the development of Charleston. The completion of the North Bend Bridge (now Conde McCullough Memorial Bridge) in 1936 and the Roosevelt Highway significantly improved modern transportation connections and provided the final link in opening the Coos region to the outside world. The formerly remote district known as the Coos Bay country had come of age.

During the interregnum of despair between Franklin Roosevelt's election and his inauguration, the only bank in North Bend, the First National, was forced to temporarily close its doors, precipitating a cash-flow crisis for the City of North Bend. The city solved this problem by minting currency using myrtlewood discs printed on a newspaper press. These coins, in denominations from 25 cents to $10, were used to make payroll and the city promised to redeem them for cash as soon as it became available.

However, when the bank reopened and the city appealed for people to bring their myrtlewood money in to redeem it, many opted to keep their tokens as collector's items. After several appeals, the city gave up and announced that the tokens would remain legal tender in the city of North Bend in perpetuity. Until the 1960s, people occasionally did cash in their tokens, but the remaining pieces have become very valuable through scarcity and historical interest. Fewer than 10 full sets are believed to exist.

== Geography ==
According to the United States Census Bureau, the city has a total area of 5.09 square miles (13.18 km^{2}), of which 3.92 square miles (10.15 km^{2}) is land and 1.17 square miles (3.03 km^{2}) is water.

=== Climate ===
The climate in North Bend and surrounds can be described as a very humid version of the Mediterranean climate or a dry-summer version of an oceanic climate. There is very little temperature variation throughout the year, with monthly means ranging from 46.4 °F (8.0 °C) in December to 60.1 °F (15.6 °C) in August, though on the rare occasions continental air masses penetrate they can be much more extreme, with the lowest on record being 17 °F (−8 °C) on December 21, 1990. Conversely, the record high is 96 °F (36 °C), set in July 1925. Cool breezes off the Pacific moderate the city's climate year round. Rain is abundant in winter, due to moist low pressure troughs from the Pacific Ocean. The city's annual rainfall is about 64.7 inches (1,643 mm), but totals are less than an inch in July and August. Fog often blankets the coastal fringe in summer due to the temperature gradient between the cool Pacific Ocean and the warm inland, which serves to keep temperatures markedly cooler than in Eugene or even Seattle. Snow almost never falls in the city, but can be heavy in the adjacent Oregon Coast Range. Nearby Cape Blanco is one of the windiest places on Earth, with gusts of 125 miles per hour (201 km/h) or more achieved during severe winter storms. Annually, the city sees 25 days that fail to reach 50 °F (10 °C) and just 12 days with a temperature at or below freezing.

The most recent temperature numbers show North Bend to be the northernmost subtropical climate weather station in North America according to the Trewartha climate classification. This is despite the station being higher in latitude than Milwaukee, Wisconsin. There are now eight months averaging above 50 °F (10 °C.)

Climate data for North Bend, Oregon (1991–2020 normals, extremes 1902–present)
Month	Jan	Feb	Mar	Apr	May	Jun	Jul	Aug	Sep	Oct	Nov	Dec	Year
Record high °F (°C)	74 (23)	82 (28)	86 (30)	88 (31)	95 (35)	100 (38)	98 (37)	96 (36)	94 (34)	95 (35)	78 (26)	70 (21)	100 (38)
Mean maximum °F (°C)	64.6 (18.1)	65.5 (18.6)	66.9 (19.4)	69.3 (20.7)	71.3 (21.8)	71.6 (22.0)	72.5 (22.5)	76.0 (24.4)	79.7 (26.5)	76.4 (24.7)	67.2 (19.6)	62.9 (17.2)	84.5 (29.2)
Mean daily maximum °F (°C)	53.5 (11.9)	54.1 (12.3)	55.1 (12.8)	56.7 (13.7)	60.5 (15.8)	63.5 (17.5)	66.1 (18.9)	67.3 (19.6)	66.7 (19.3)	62.8 (17.1)	56.8 (13.8)	52.9 (11.6)	59.7 (15.4)
Daily mean °F (°C)	47.3 (8.5)	47.6 (8.7)	48.5 (9.2)	50.4 (10.2)	54.2 (12.3)	57.4 (14.1)	59.8 (15.4)	60.4 (15.8)	59.0 (15.0)	54.9 (12.7)	50.2 (10.1)	46.7 (8.2)	53.0 (11.7)
Mean daily minimum °F (°C)	41.0 (5.0)	41.0 (5.0)	41.9 (5.5)	44.0 (6.7)	48.0 (8.9)	51.2 (10.7)	53.6 (12.0)	53.6 (12.0)	51.3 (10.7)	47.0 (8.3)	43.5 (6.4)	40.4 (4.7)	46.4 (8.0)
Mean minimum °F (°C)	31.2 (−0.4)	31.2 (−0.4)	33.3 (0.7)	35.7 (2.1)	38.7 (3.7)	44.0 (6.7)	47.5 (8.6)	46.9 (8.3)	43.7 (6.5)	37.9 (3.3)	32.8 (0.4)	30.5 (−0.8)	27.4 (−2.6)
Record low °F (°C)	16 (−9)	14 (−10)	18 (−8)	27 (−3)	26 (−3)	33 (1)	35 (2)	35 (2)	30 (−1)	26 (−3)	20 (−7)	13 (−11)	13 (−11)
Average precipitation inches (mm)	9.43 (240)	6.99 (178)	7.49 (190)	5.40 (137)	2.95 (75)	1.55 (39)	0.35 (8.9)	0.42 (11)	1.55 (39)	4.24 (108)	8.30 (211)	10.47 (266)	59.14 (1,502)
Average snowfall inches (cm)	0.0 (0.0)	0.0 (0.0)	0.0 (0.0)	0.0 (0.0)	0.0 (0.0)	0.0 (0.0)	0.0 (0.0)	0.0 (0.0)	0.0 (0.0)	0.0 (0.0)	0.0 (0.0)	0.2 (0.51)	0.2 (0.51)
Average precipitation days (≥ 0.01 inch)	19.2	17.5	19.0	17.3	12.4	9.1	3.3	4.2	5.8	12.8	18.9	19.6	159.1
Average snowy days (≥ 0.1 in)	0.2	0.1	0.1	0.0	0.0	0.0	0.0	0.0	0.0	0.0	0.1	0.1	0.6
Source: NOAA

== Demographics ==
Historical population
Census	Pop.	Note	%±
1880	84		—
1910	2,078		—
1920	3,268		57.3%
1930	4,012		22.8%
1940	4,602		14.7%
1950	6,099		32.5%
1960	7,512		23.2%
1970	8,553		13.9%
1980	9,779		14.3%
1990	9,614		−1.7%
2000	9,544		−0.7%
2010	9,695		1.6%
2020	10,317		6.4%

=== 2020 census ===
As of the 2020 census, North Bend had a population of 10,317. The median age was 41.9 years. 21.4% of residents were under the age of 18 and 22.2% of residents were 65 years of age or older. For every 100 females there were 92.5 males, and for every 100 females age 18 and over there were 89.6 males age 18 and over.

100.0% of residents lived in urban areas, while 0% lived in rural areas.

There were 4,294 households in North Bend, of which 28.6% had children under the age of 18 living in them. Of all households, 41.6% were married-couple households, 18.3% were households with a male householder and no spouse or partner present, and 31.0% were households with a female householder and no spouse or partner present. About 30.8% of all households were made up of individuals and 16.0% had someone living alone who was 65 years of age or older.

There were 4,593 housing units, of which 6.5% were vacant. Among occupied housing units, 55.6% were owner-occupied and 44.4% were renter-occupied. The homeowner vacancy rate was 2.1% and the rental vacancy rate was 3.9%.

Racial composition as of the 2020 census
Race	Number	Percent
White	8,573	83.1%
Black or African American	57	0.6%
American Indian and Alaska Native	231	2.2%
Asian	247	2.4%
Native Hawaiian and Other Pacific Islander	40	0.4%
Some other race	265	2.6%
Two or more races	904	8.8%
Hispanic or Latino (of any race)	749	7.3%

North Bend is the second largest city in Oregon's Bay Area.

=== 2010 census ===
As of the census of 2010, there were 9,695 people, 4,113 households, and 2,495 families residing in the city. The population density was 2,473.2 inhabitants per square mile (954.9/km^{2}). There were 4,450 housing units at an average density of 1,135.2 per square mile (438.3/km^{2}). The racial makeup of the city was 89.3% White, 0.3% African American, 2.3% Native American, 1.7% Asian, 0.2% Pacific Islander, 1.3% from other races, and 4.9% from two or more races. Hispanic or Latino people of any race were 5.8% of the population.

28.7% of households had children under the age of 18 living with them, 43.9% were married couples living together, 12.4% had a female householder with no husband present, 4.4% had a male householder with no wife present, and 39.3% were non-families. 30.8% of all households were made up of individuals, and 13.6% had someone living alone who was 65 years of age or older. The average household size was 2.33 and the average family size was 2.87.

The median age in the city was 41.3 years. 21.9% of residents were under the age of 18; 8.8% were between the ages of 18 and 24; 23.3% were from 25 to 44; 28.2% were from 45 to 64; and 17.6% were 65 years of age or older. The gender makeup of the city was 47.6% male and 52.4% female.

=== 2000 census ===
Per the 2000 census, there were 9,544 people, 3,969 households, and 2,556 families residing in North Bend and the population density was 2,445.7 inhabitants per square mile (944.3/km^{2}). There were 4,291 housing units at an average density of 1,099.6 per square mile (424.6/km^{2}). The ethnic statistics for the city were 92.49% White, 0.38% African American, 1.79% Native American, 1.31% Asian, 0.34% Pacific Islander, 1.03% from other races, and 2.67% from two or more races. Hispanic or Latino of any race were 3.71% of the population.

There were 3,969 households, out of which 30.9% had children under the age of 18 living with them, 49.8% were married couples living together, 11.5% had a female householder with no husband present, and 35.6% were non-families. The statistics for how many male householders without a wife present was not recorded by the 2000 Census. 30.1% of all households were made up of individuals, and 13.9% had someone living alone who was 65 years of age or older. The average household size was 2.35 and the average family size was 2.91. North Bend's population dispersal was 24.6% under the age of 18, 7.9% from 18 to 24, 25.8% from 25 to 44, 24.6% from 45 to 64, and 17.1% who were 65 years of age or older. The median age was 40 years. For every 100 females, there were 90.3 males. For every 100 females age 18 and over, there were 87.5 males. The median income for a household in the city was $33,333, and the median income for a family was $41,755. Male median income was $34,494 and female median income was $23,244. The per capita income for the city was $16,703. About 11.8% of families and 14.8% of the population were below the poverty line, including 20.0% of those under age 18 and 13.0% of those age 65 or over.

== Arts and culture ==
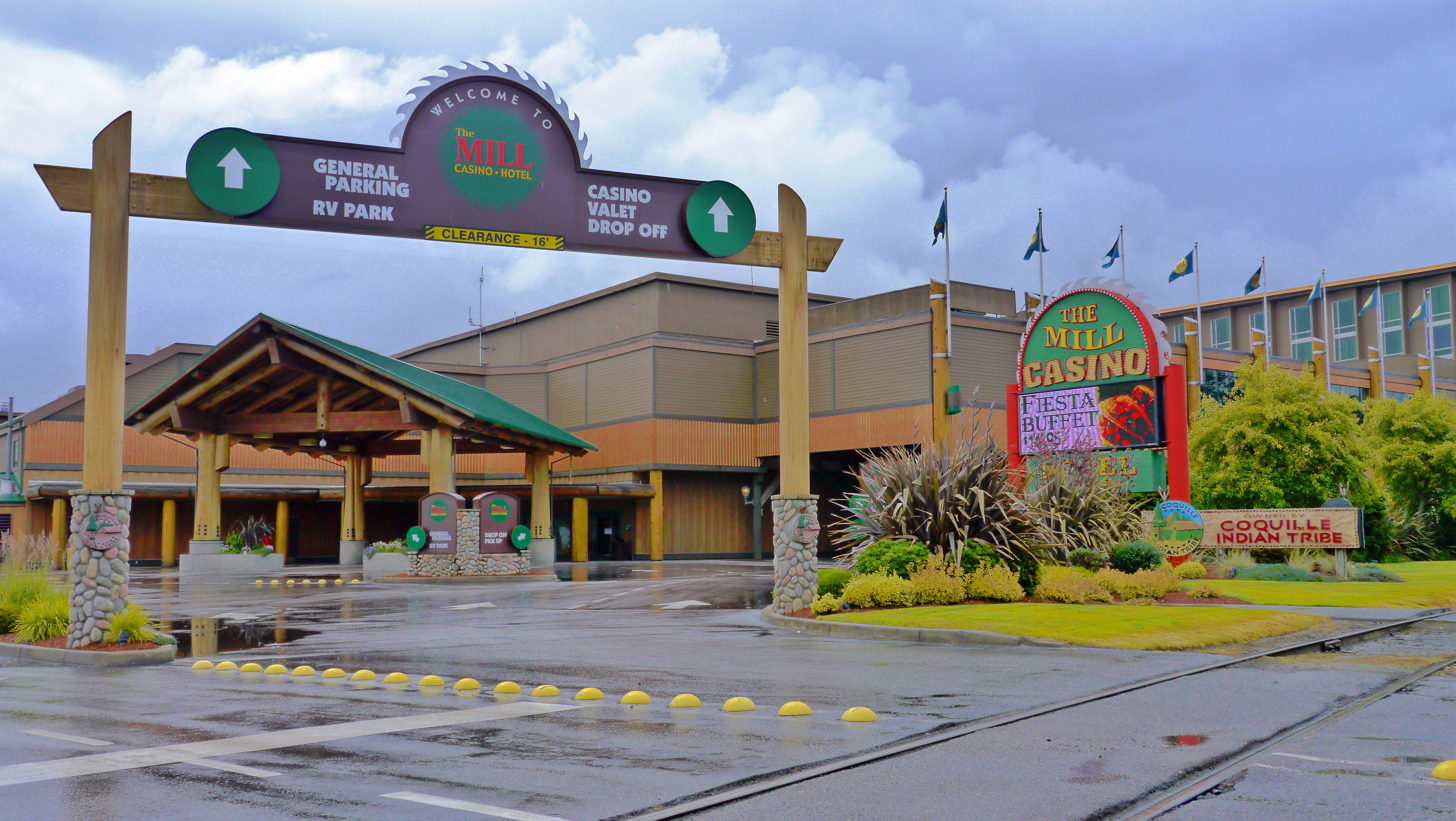
The Mill Casino in North Bend

North Bend has a public recreational boat ramp that accesses Coos Bay, along with a concrete pier and boardwalk area completed in 2010 per North Bend's regional urban renewal policy. North Bend has a public Olympic-sized indoor pool. The Pony Village Mall in North Bend is an indoor shopping mall. The Mill Casino is a Native American gaming entertainment center in North Bend with a hotel, gambling, and restaurants.

Oregon's freight wagon from the Merci Train is on display in a protected enclosure in Simpson Park.

== Tribal government ==
The seat of the Coquille Indian Tribe's tribal government is located in North Bend, which is a United States recognized sovereign tribe of Native Americans who have traditionally lived on the southern Oregon Coast. The Coquille Tribe owns several businesses, including The Mill Casino and Hotel, an organic cranberry growing and packing operation in North Bend, Heritage Place assisted living center, and ORCA Communications, a telecommunications provider.

== Education ==
The North Bend School District provides K–12 public education for residents of the area.

== Media ==
=== Radio ===
- KTEE 94.9 FM (commercial)
- KOOS 107.3 FM (commercial)
- KBBR 1340 AM (commercial)
- KMHS 1420 AM (high school)

== Notable people ==
- Louis J. Simpson (1877–1949) shipping and timber magnate

== Transportation ==
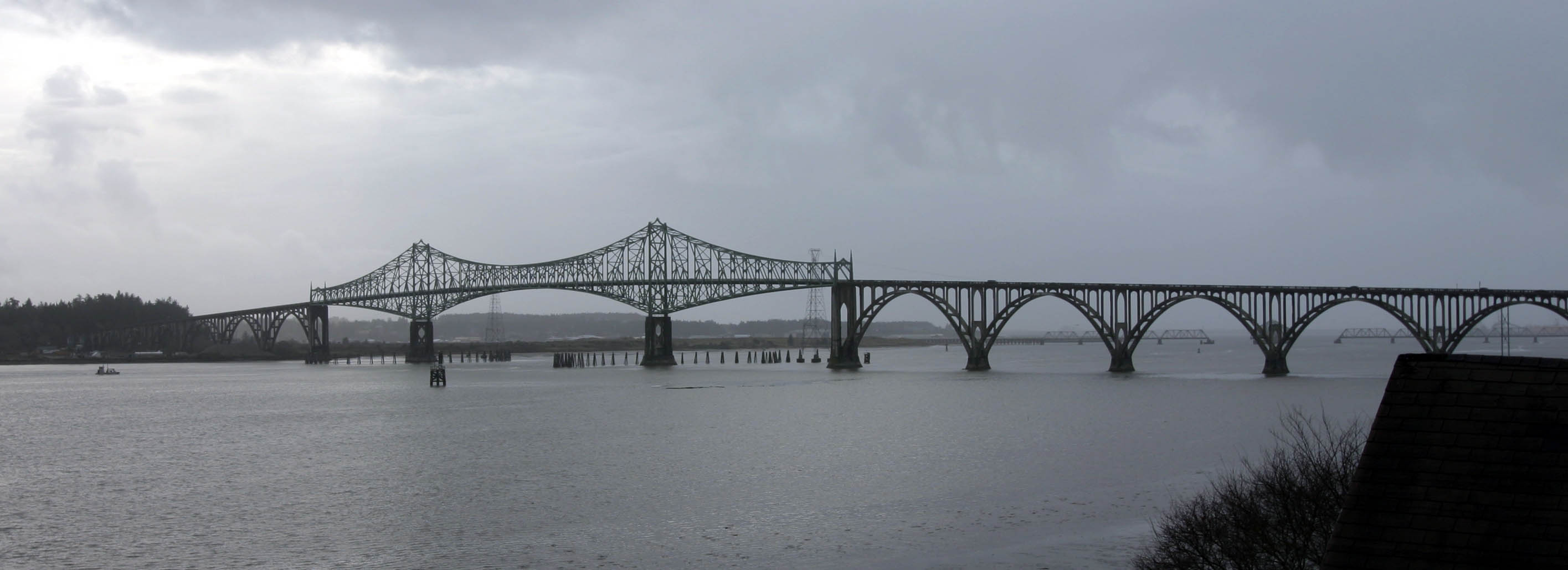
The Conde McCullough Memorial Bridge (in North Bend), also known as the "North Bend Bridge", as seen from the east

=== Air ===
The Southwest Oregon Regional Airport near North Bend and Coos Bay is the only commercial airport on the Oregon Coast.

=== Road ===
The Conde McCullough Memorial Bridge is located in North Bend. It carries U.S. Route 101, which runs between Tumwater, Washington and Los Angeles, California.

=== Rail ===
The city is served by the Coos Bay Rail Line, which runs from Coquille to Eugene. The route is freight only, and is owned by the Port of Coos Bay.

== See also ==
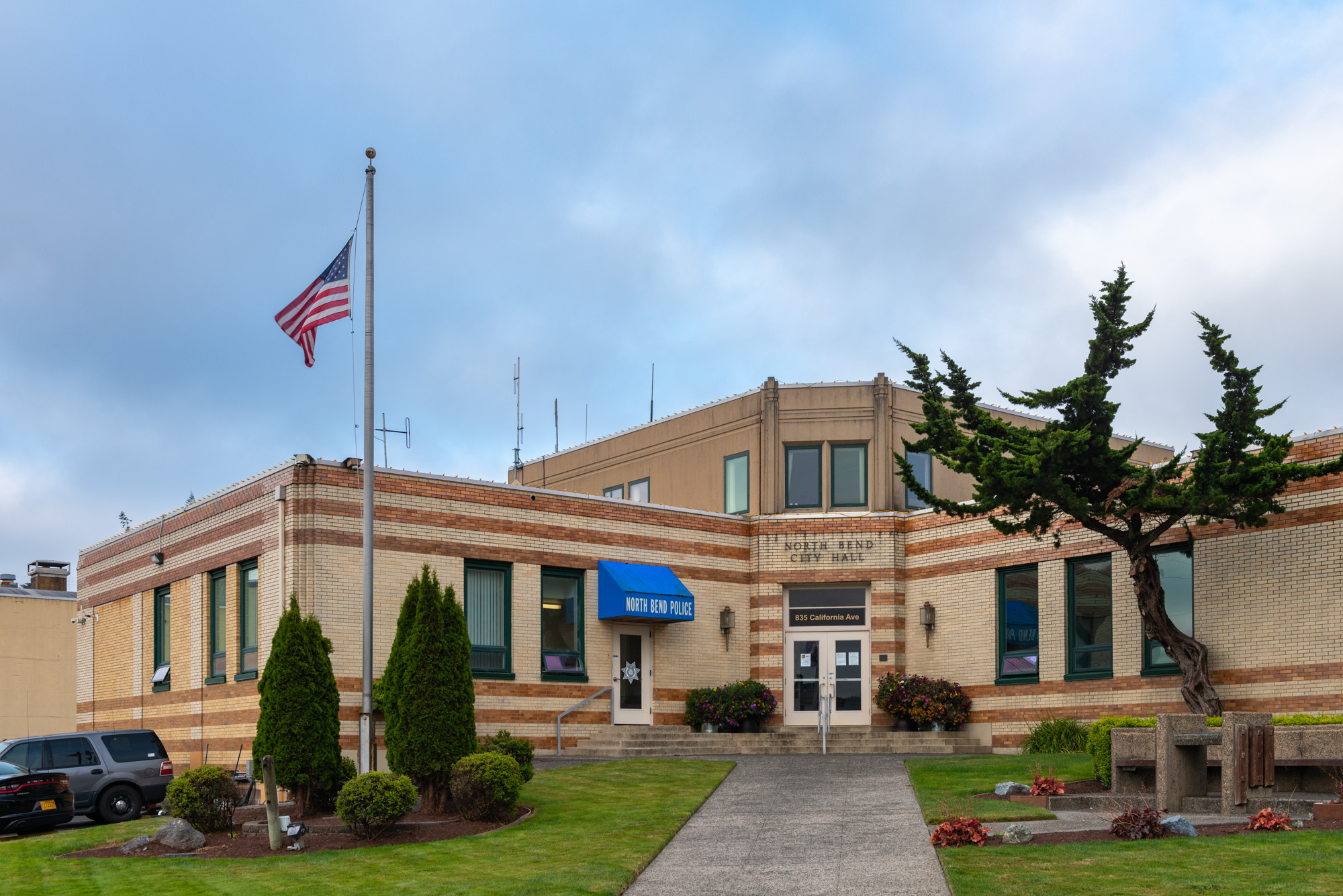
North Bend City Hall

- Coast Guard Air Station North Bend
- Steamboats of Coos Bay (historical)
- Steamboats of the Oregon Coast (historical)
