= Raymond Clapper =

American journalist (1892–1944)

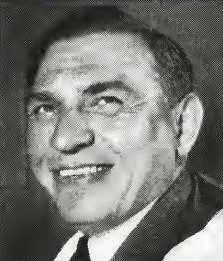
- Born: Raymond Lewis Clapper; May 30, 1892; La Cygne, Kansas, United States
- Died: February 1, 1944 (aged 51); Marshall Islands, South Seas Mandate, Japan
- Occupation: Journalist
- Spouse: Olive Ewing (m. 1913)
- Children: 1 son, 1 daughter

Raymond Lewis Clapper (May 30, 1892 – February 1, 1944) was an American journalist, commentator and news analyst for both radio and newspapers who was described in a Life magazine article as "one of America's ablest and most-respected journalists." Clapper died in a plane crash while covering the invasion of the Marshall Islands during World War II.

== Early years ==
Raymond Lewis Clapper was born on May 30, 1892 in La Cygne, Kansas, the son of a farmer of Pennsylvania Dutch ancestry. When he was young, his father moved the family to Kansas City, Kansas in order to take a factory job to better support his family. Clapper married Olive Ewing in 1913. They had a daughter and a son.

Clapper was a graduate of the University of Kansas. In 1915, he was elected editor-in-chief of the University Daily Kansan, the campus newspaper.

== Newspapers ==
In the summer of 1916, while he was still enrolled at the University of Kansas, Clapper worked as a reporter for The Kansas City Star. That fall, he began working for the United Press (UP) wire service in Chicago. In 1917, he was promoted to manager of UP's Northwest Bureau, which had headquarters in Chicago and served newspapers in western Canada and portions of six states.

In 1923, Clapper was transferred to Washington, D.C., to report on politics there. Six years later, he was made the manager of UP's Washington operation.

Clapper's success resulted to a large extent from "his objective writing style and his ability to explain the politics and policies of Washington for the average reader." His reputation was enhanced nationally by an exposé, "Racketeering in Washington," that was published in 1933. Later that year he was hired by The Washington Post. A year later, he began a column, Between You and Me, which was distributed daily to 176 Scripps-Howard Newspapers newspapers.

== Radio ==
Clapper was a newscaster for the Mutual Broadcasting System in the 1930s and 1940s. In 1942, he replaced Raymond Gram Swing on Mutual's evening newscast when Swing moved to another network. A reviewer writing about Clapper's debut broadcast wrote, "His approach is colloquial, colorful and vivid ..."

He also "read and interpreted" election results on NBC in November 1938 and was part of NBC's team of reporters covering the 1940 Republican National Convention.

Clapper's success in newspapers and radio led to opportunities in public speaking. An article in the January 24, 1942, issue of Billboard listed Clapper among "top radio names who are currently lecturing or have recently lectured, and who have been getting between $1,000 and $1,500."

== Death ==
Clapper was killed February 1, 1944, during World War II, when an airplane in which he was riding collided with another plane while reporting on the Allied invasion of the Marshall Islands. "Both planes crashed into a lagoon," a news report said, leaving no survivors. When he died, Clapper was still officially a political columnist for Scripps-Howard, but he was reporting on the invasion of the Marshall Islands.

Famed war correspondent Ernie Pyle, the first recipient of the Raymond Clapper Memorial Award (May 1944), wrote: "Ray Clapper's passing hit us hard. He had many friends in the war theater. He traveled to all the wars because he felt it his duty to inform himself, and everywhere he went he was liked for himself and respected for his fine mind."

Marquis Childs took over Clapper's column Washington Calling when he died.

== Book ==
Clapper's widow edited some of his columns into a book, Watching the World, published on July 10, 1944, by Whittlesey House, McGraw-Hill Book Company, Inc. The book was described in a contemporary advertisement as containing "the cream of his work -- columns, broadcasts, articles ... reflecting outstanding events during those critical years." The book included a 32-page biography of Clapper by Mrs. Clapper.

== Legacy ==
Clapper's legacy included the following:

- The Raymond Clapper Memorial Association was incorporated on March 10, 1944, in Washington, D.C. "to perpetuate the memory of Clapper" through the Raymond Clapper Memorial Award, which was presented annually "to a journalist or team for distinguished Washington reporting." The White House Correspondents' Association, and sometimes the American Society of Newspaper Editors, distributed the Raymond Clapper Award from 1944 to 2003, at which point it passed to Scripps Howard's National Journalism Awards. Under Scripps Howard, the Washington Reporting Raymond Clapper Award was presented from 2004 to 2011, at which point it was discontinued.
- In 1944, the World War II Liberty ship SS Raymond Clapper was launched in Jacksonville, Florida. It was sponsored by Clapper's widow and daughter and built by St. Johns River Shipbuilding Company.
- The Library of Congress has 75,000 items in its "Raymond Clapper papers, 1908-1962" collection.
