= SS Raymond Clapper =

Liberty ship of WWII

History

United States
- Name: Raymond Clapper
- Namesake: Raymond Clapper
- Owner: War Shipping Administration (WSA)
- Operator: T. J. Stevenson & Company, Inc.
- Ordered: as type (EC2-S-C1) hull, MC hull 2479
- Awarded: 23 April 1943
- Builder: St. Johns River Shipbuilding Company, Jacksonville, Florida
- Cost: $1,087,111
- Yard number: 43
- Way number: 1
- Laid down: 17 April 1944
- Launched: 22 May 1944
- Sponsored by: Miss Jane Clapper
- Completed: 13 June 1944
- Identification: Call sign: WOEW
- Fate: Sold for commercial use, 12 June 1947

United States
- Name: T.J. Stevenson
- Namesake: T.J. Stevenson
- Owner: Ocean Freighting & Brokerage Corp.
- Fate: Sold, 1954

Liberia
- Name: Shamrock
- Owner: Shamrock Steamship Corp.
- Fate: Sold, 1954

(1954-1960) (1960-1965)
- Name: Master Nicky (1954-1960); Thrylos (1960-1965)
- Owner: Niki Cia. Nav., SA
- Fate: Sold, 1965

Greece
- Name: Elias Dayfas II
- Owner: Volbay Navigation, SA
- Operator: Daymark Shiping Agency
- Fate: Abandoned, 7 May 1966, presumed sunk

General characteristics
- Class & type: Liberty ship; type EC2-S-C1, standard
- Tonnage: 10,865 LT DWT; 7,176 GRT
- Displacement: 3,380 long tons (3,434 t) (light); 14,245 long tons (14,474 t) (max)
- Length: 441 feet 6 inches (135 m) oa; 416 feet (127 m) pp; 427 feet (130 m) lwl
- Beam: 57 feet (17 m)
- Draft: 27 ft 9.25 in (8.4646 m)
- Installed power: 2 × Oil fired 450 °F (232 °C) boilers, operating at 220 psi (1,500 kPa); 2,500 hp (1,900 kW)
- Propulsion: 1 × triple-expansion steam engine, (manufactured by Filer and Stowell, Milwaukee, Wisconsin); 1 × screw propeller
- Speed: 11.5 knots (21.3 km/h; 13.2 mph)
- Capacity: 562,608 cubic feet (15,931 m^{3}) (grain); 499,573 cubic feet (14,146 m^{3}) (bale)
- Complement: 38–62 USMM; 21–40 USNAG
- Armament: Varied by ship; Bow-mounted 3-inch (76 mm)/50-caliber gun; Stern-mounted 4-inch (102 mm)/50-caliber gun; 2–8 × single 20-millimeter (0.79 in) Oerlikon anti-aircraft (AA) cannons and/or, 2–8 × 37-millimeter (1.46 in) M1 AA guns

SS Raymond Clapper was a Liberty ship built in the United States during World War II. She was named after Raymond Clapper, a commentator and news analyst for both radio and newspapers.

== Construction ==
Raymond Clapper was laid down on 17 April 1944, under a Maritime Commission (MARCOM) contract, MC hull 2479, by the St. Johns River Shipbuilding Company, Jacksonville, Florida; she was sponsored by Miss Jane Clapper, the daughter of the namesake, and was launched on 23 May 1944.

== History ==
She was allocated to the T.J. Stevenson & Co.Inc., on 13 June 1944. She was sold for commercial use, 12 June 1947, to Ocean Freighting & Brokerage Corp., and renamed T.J. Stevenson. After several name and owner changes on 7 May 1966, named Elias Dayfas II, she was abandoned off the Yucatán Peninsula, near 21°09′N 86°28′W, after developing leaks. She was taken in tow but later broke loose and was presumed sunk.

== Bibliography ==
- "St. John's River Shipbuilding, Jacksonville FL". www.ShipbuildingHistory.com. 16 October 2010.
- Maritime Administration. "Raymond Clapper". Ship History Database Vessel Status Card. U.S. Department of Transportation, Maritime Administration.
- Davies, James (May 2004). "Specifications (As-Built)" (PDF). p. 23.
- "SS Raymond Clapper".
