= USS Pipestone =

Cargo ship of the United States Navy

History

United States
- Name: Coastal Explorer (1944–1945, 1945–); Pipestone (1945)
- Namesake: Pipestone County, Minnesota
- Ordered: as type (C1-M-AV1) hull, MC hull 2157
- Builder: Globe Shipbuilding Co., Superior, Wisconsin
- Yard number: 124
- Launched: 6 March 1945
- Completed: 23 November 1945
- Acquired: April 1945
- Commissioned: Returned to the US Maritime Commission (MARCOM) prior to commissioning
- Identification: Hull symbol: AK-203
- Fate: Returned to MARCOM, 23 November 1945

United States
- Name: Coastal Explorer
- Owner: MARCOM
- Operator: Grace Line, Inc. (1945); T. J. Stevenson & Company, Inc. (1946)
- Acquired: 23 November 1945
- In service: 23 November 1945
- Out of service: 13 March 1946
- Fate: Sold, 20 February 1947

Peru
- Name: Putumayo
- Namesake: Putumayo Province
- Operator: Corperacion Peruana e Vapores, Callao, Peru
- Acquired: 20 February 1947
- Fate: Sold, 1968

Peru
- Name: Felipe
- Operator: Naviera Panamar S.A., Callao, Peru
- Acquired: 1968
- Fate: Sold

Panama
- Name: Felipe
- Operator: Gold Shipping S.A., Panama
- Fate: Scrapped, 1974

General characteristics
- Class & type: Alamosa-class cargo ship
- Type: C1-M-AV1
- Tonnage: 5,032 long tons deadweight (DWT)
- Displacement: 2,382 long tons (2,420 t) (standard); 7,450 long tons (7,570 t) (full load)
- Length: 388 ft 8 in (118.47 m)
- Beam: 50 ft (15 m)
- Draft: 21 ft 1 in (6.43 m)
- Installed power: 1 × Nordberg, TSM 6 diesel engine; 1,750 shp (1,300 kW)
- Propulsion: 1 × propeller
- Speed: 11.5 kn (21.3 km/h; 13.2 mph)
- Capacity: 3,945 t (3,883 long tons) DWT; 9,830 cu ft (278 m^{3}) (refrigerated); 227,730 cu ft (6,449 m^{3}) (non-refrigerated)
- Complement: 15 Officers; 70 Enlisted
- Armament: 1 × 3 in (76 mm)/50-caliber dual-purpose gun (DP); 6 × 20 mm (0.8 in) Oerlikon anti-aircraft (AA) cannons

USS Pipestone (AK-203) was an Alamosa-class cargo ship that was constructed for the US Navy during the closing period of World War II. By the time she was scheduled for commissioning, the war's end caused her to be declared “excess to needs” and she was returned to the US Government and struck by the Navy.

== Construction ==
Pipestone was laid down under US Maritime Commission (MARCOM) contract, MC hull 2157, by Globe Shipbuilding Co., Superior, Wisconsin. She was transferred to the Navy in April 1945. Pipestone was scheduled for commissioning. However, because of the Allied victory in the Pacific Ocean theatre of operations, her commissioning was delayed.

== Merchant service ==
Pipestone was ordered returned to MARCOM for disposal. Her name subsequently reverted to Coastal Explorer.

Coastal Explorer was used by a couple of shipping companies from 1945 to 1946, before being sold to the government of the Republic of Peru for $693,862.

On 20 February 1947, she was sold to the Peru. She was operated by Corperacion Peruana e Vapores, Callao, Peru, and renamed Putumayo. In 1968 she was sold to Naviera Panamar S.A., also of Callao, and renamed Felipe.

She was eventually sold to Gold Shipping S.A., Panama, and finally sold for scrapping to Spanish ship breakers in 1974.

== Notes ==
Citations

== Bibliography ==
Online resources

- "C1 Cargo Ships". www.ShipbuildingHistory.com. 28 August 2009.
- "USS Pipestone (AK-203)". NavSource. 12 November 2010.
- "Coastal Explorer". United States Department of Transportation. Archived from the original on November 4, 2016.
