= Shore Acres State Park =

State park in Oregon, United States

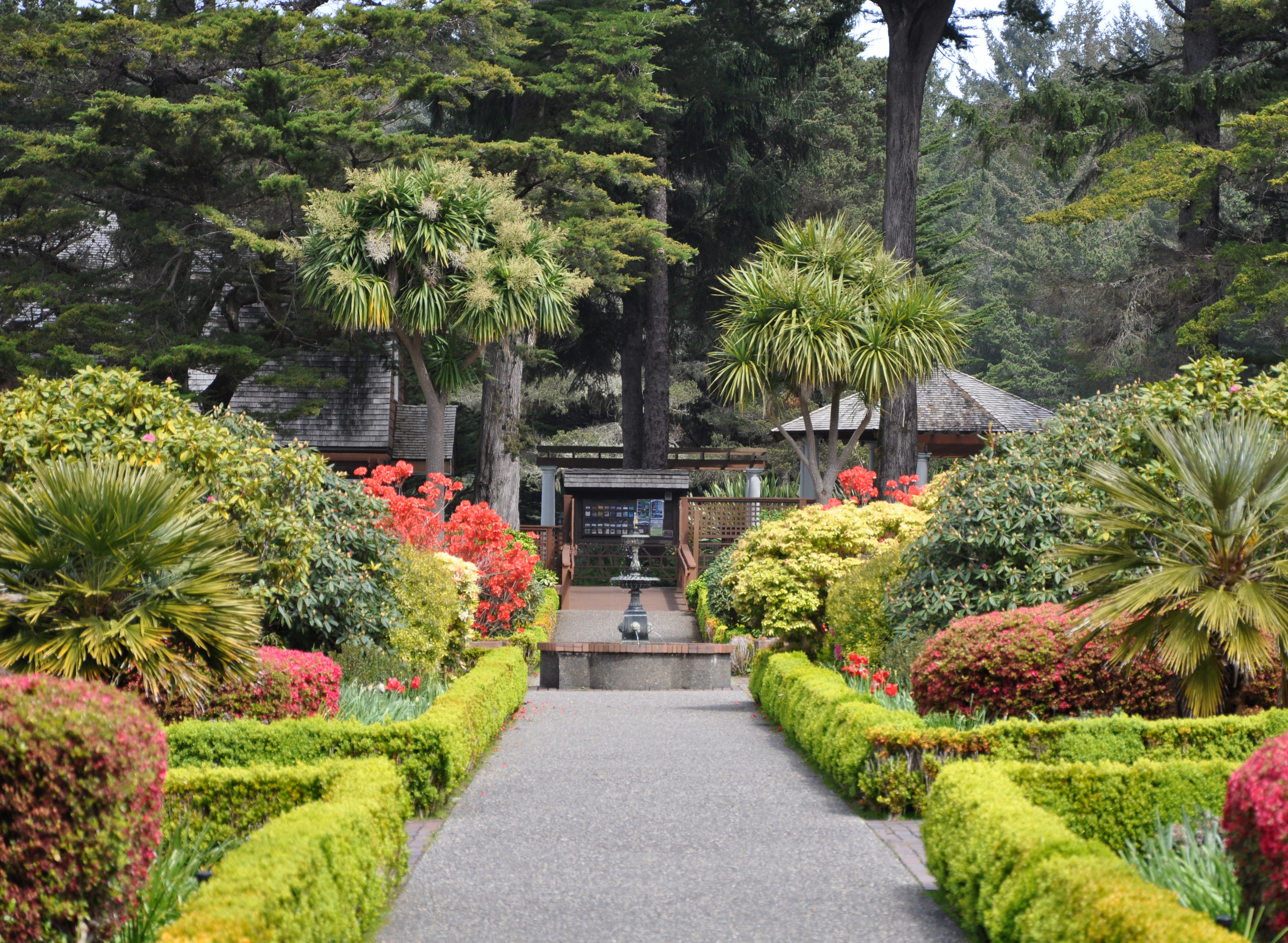
- Formal garden in the park

- Location within Oregon Location within the United States
- Type: Public, state
- Location: Coos County, Oregon
- Nearest city: Coos Bay
- Coordinates: 43°19′25″N 124°22′55″W
- Area: 745 acres (301 ha)
- Created: 1942
- Operator: Oregon Parks and Recreation Department
- Visitors: About 250,000 a year
- Open: 8am to dusk
- Website: Official website

Shore Acres State Park is a state park 13 miles (21 km) south of Coos Bay in the U.S. state of Oregon. It is one of three state parks along the Cape Arago Highway, which runs along the Pacific Ocean west of U.S. Route 101. Sunset Bay State Park is about 1 mile (1.6 km) north of Shore Acres, and Cape Arago State Park is about a mile south.

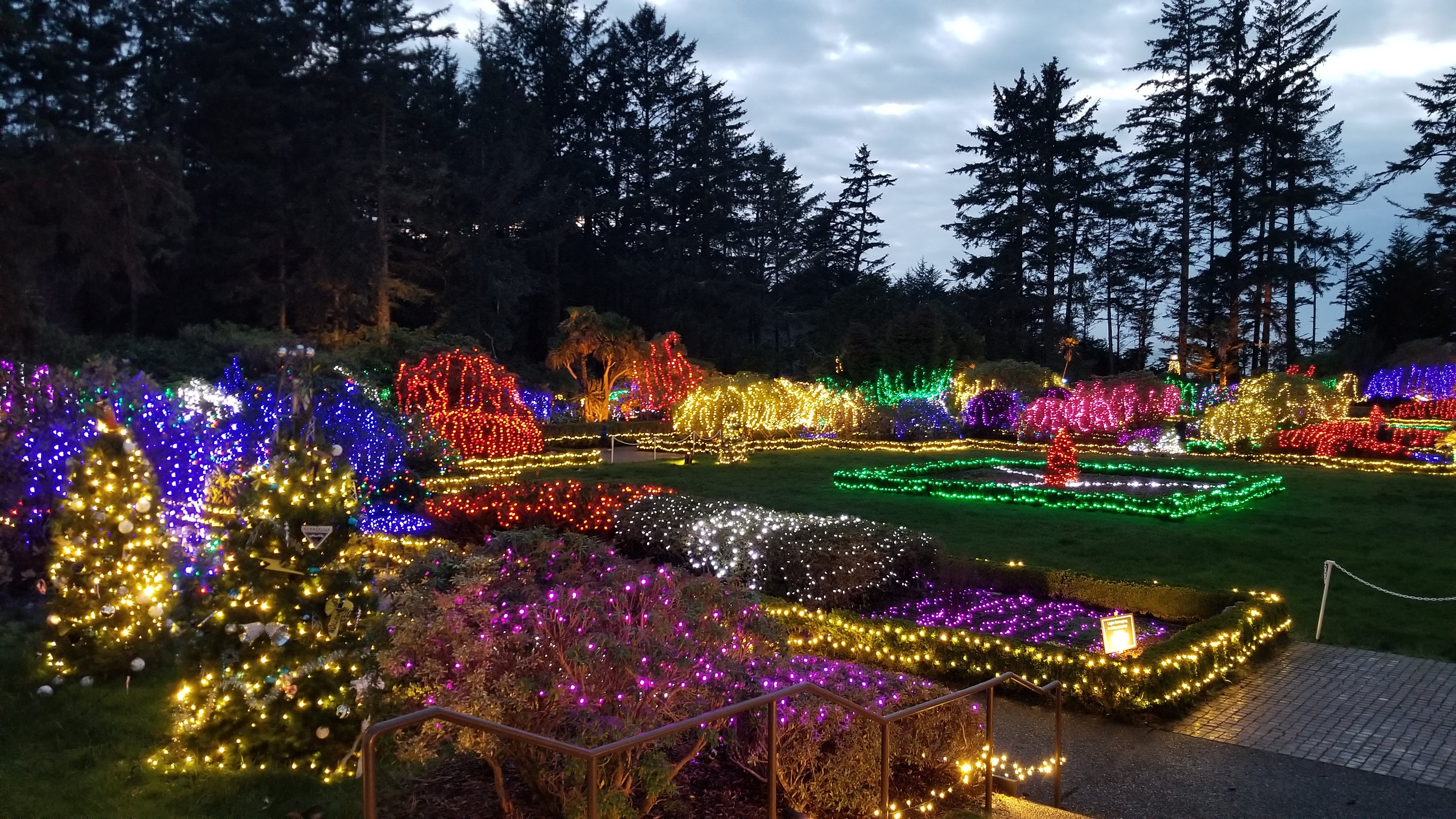
Shore Acres Holiday Lights

The park features 5 acres (2 ha) of formal gardens including a rose-testing plot and Japanese lily pond, as well as ocean views and beach access. In the cooler months, visitors can watch storms and migrating whales from the park's sandstone cliffs. Another seasonal attraction is the Shore Acres Holiday Lights, lasting from Thanksgiving to New Year's Eve, when the gardens are decorated with lights and illuminated sculptures.

Shore Acres was originally built as an estate in 1910 for Louis J. Simpson, a Coos County timber baron and son of shipping magnate Asa Meade Simpson. After a 1921 fire and financial losses devastated his estate holdings, Simpson sold the land to the State of Oregon for use as a park in 1942. The site was initially used as a radar station by the U.S. Army during World War II and decommissioned in 1948; the buildings on the property were used as barracks and were demolished after the war. The state, which acquired park additions from other owners between 1956 and 1980, began restoring the garden in 1970.

== See also ==
- List of Oregon state parks
