= Louis J. Simpson =

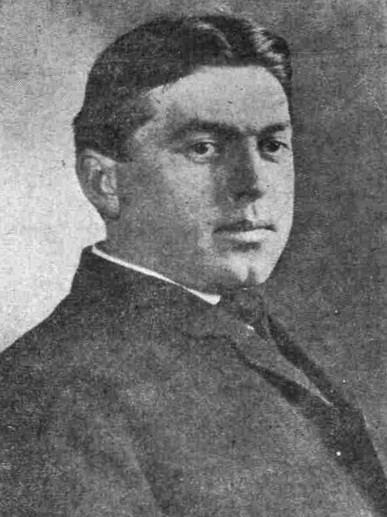
Simpson, circa 1906

Louis Jerome Simpson (1 September 1877 – 17 January 1949) was an American shipping and timber magnate and the founder of North Bend, Oregon. He also ran unsuccessfully for governor of Oregon in 1918. Simpson dropped out of the University of California in 1897 to run his father Asa Meade Simpson's ship fleet and lumber mills on Coos Bay. The gardens of his clifftop estate are now part of Shore Acres State Park.
