= USS Interceptor =

Guardian-class radar picket ship

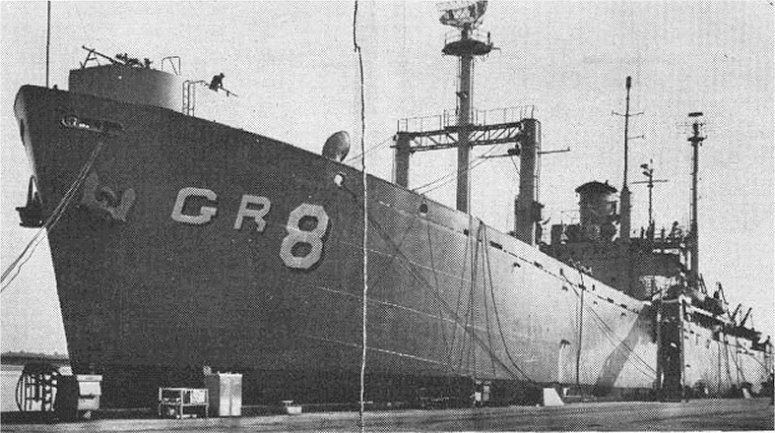
- USS Interceptor (YAGR-8), ex-Edward W. Burton, moored pierside at Charleston Naval Shipyard, Charleston, S.C., c. 1955-56.

History

United States
- Name: Edward W. Burton
- Namesake: Edward W. Burton
- Owner: War Shipping Administration (WSA)
- Operator: R.A.Nichol & Co.Inc.
- Ordered: as type (EC2-S-C5) hull, MC hull 3147
- Builder: J.A. Jones Construction, Panama City, Florida
- Cost: $850.797
- Yard number: 107
- Way number: 4
- Laid down: 10 July 1945
- Launched: 12 September 1945
- Sponsored by: Miss Juanita M. Kaylor
- Completed: 28 September 1945
- Identification: Call sign: AOHR
- Fate: Acquired by US Navy, 28 June 1955

United States
- Name: Interceptor
- Namesake: One who intercepts
- Commissioned: 15 February 1956
- Decommissioned: 5 July 1965
- Reclassified: Guardian-class radar picket ship
- Refit: Charleston Naval Shipyard, Charleston, South Carolina
- Stricken: 1 September 1965
- Home port: San Francisco, California
- Identification: Hull symbol: YAGR-8 (1956–1958); Hull symbol: AGR-8 (1958–1978)
- Fate: Scrapped, 16 February 1978

General characteristics
- Class & type: Liberty ship; type EC2-S-C5, boxed aircraft transport
- Tonnage: 10,600 LT DWT; 7,200 GRT
- Displacement: 3,380 long tons (3,434 t) (light); 14,245 long tons (14,474 t) (max)
- Length: 441 feet 6 inches (135 m) oa; 416 feet (127 m) pp; 427 feet (130 m) lwl
- Beam: 57 feet (17 m)
- Draft: 27 ft 9.25 in (8.4646 m)
- Installed power: 2 × Oil fired 450 °F (232 °C) boilers, operating at 220 psi (1,500 kPa); 2,500 hp (1,900 kW)
- Propulsion: 1 × triple-expansion steam engine, (manufactured by Filer and Stowell, Milwaukee, Wisconsin); 1 × screw propeller
- Speed: 11.5 knots (21.3 km/h; 13.2 mph)
- Capacity: 490,000 cubic feet (13,875 m^{3}) (bale)
- Complement: 38–62 USMM; 21–40 USNAG
- Armament: Varied by ship; Bow-mounted 3-inch (76 mm)/50-caliber gun; Stern-mounted 4-inch (102 mm)/50-caliber gun; 2–8 × single 20-millimeter (0.79 in) Oerlikon anti-aircraft (AA) cannons and/or, 2–8 × 37-millimeter (1.46 in) M1 AA guns

General characteristics (US Navy refit)
- Class & type: Guardian-class radar picket ship
- Capacity: 443,646 US gallons (1,679,383 L; 369,413 imp gal) (fuel oil); 68,267 US gallons (258,419 L; 56,844 imp gal) (diesel); 15,082 US gallons (57,092 L; 12,558 imp gal) (fresh water); 1,326,657 US gallons (5,021,943 L; 1,104,673 imp gal) (fresh water ballast)
- Complement: 13 officers; 138 enlisted
- Armament: 2 × 3 inches (76 mm)/50 caliber guns

USS Interceptor (AGR-8/YAGR-8) was a Guardian-class radar picket ship acquired by the US Navy in 1955, from the "mothballed" reserve fleet. She was reconfigured as a radar picket ship and assigned to radar picket duty in the North Pacific Ocean as part of the Distant Early Warning Line.

== Construction ==
Interceptor (YAGR-8) was laid down on 10 July 1945, under a Maritime Commission (MARCOM) contract, MC hull 3147, as the Liberty Ship Edward W. Burton, by J.A. Jones Construction, Panama City, Florida. She was launched 12 September 1945; sponsored by Miss Juanita M. Kaylor; and delivered to T. J. Stevenson & Company, Inc., 8 November 1945.

== Service history ==
She served several lines as a cargo ship until being placed in the National Defense Reserve Fleet at Wilmington, North Carolina, 20 June 1948.

Acquired by the Navy, 28 June 1955, the ship was converted to a radar picket ship at Charleston Naval Shipyard, Charleston, South Carolina, and commissioned Interceptor (YAGR-8), 15 February 1956.

Interceptor was designed to carry the latest in long-range radar and communications equipment and to act as an ocean radar station ship. Following shakedown training she sailed from Charleston, 17 March 1956, en route to her new home port, San Francisco, California.

Arriving via the Panama Canal, 11 April, the ship began a regular cycle of 3– to 4–week at–sea periods as a picket ship under the Continental Air Defense Command (CONAD). Operating with search aircraft, Interceptor could detect, track, and report aircraft at great distances as well as control interceptor aircraft in the event of an air attack on the United States.

Patrolling off the coast of Canada, she formed an integral part of North America's air early warning system. Reclassified AGR-8, radar picket ship, 28 September 1958, Interceptor, for the next 7 years, operated with NORAD, in forming an important link in the nation's defenses.

== Decommissioning ==
Interceptor was struck from the Navy List 1 September 1965, and placed in the Suisun Bay Reserve Fleet, Suisun BayCalifornia, where she remained until sold for scrapping, 16 February 1978.

== See also ==
- United States Navy
- Radar picket

== Bibliography ==
- "Interceptor". Dictionary of American Naval Fighting Ships. Navy Department, Naval History and Heritage Command. This article incorporates text from this source, which is in the public domain.
- "Jones Construction, Panama City FL". www.ShipbuildingHistory.com. 13 October 2010.
- Davies, James (May 2004). "Specifications (As-Built)" (PDF). p. 23.
- "SS Edward W. Burton".
- "USS Interceptor (AGR-8)". NavSource. 9 October 2015.
