= Sunset Bay State Park =

State park in Oregon, United States

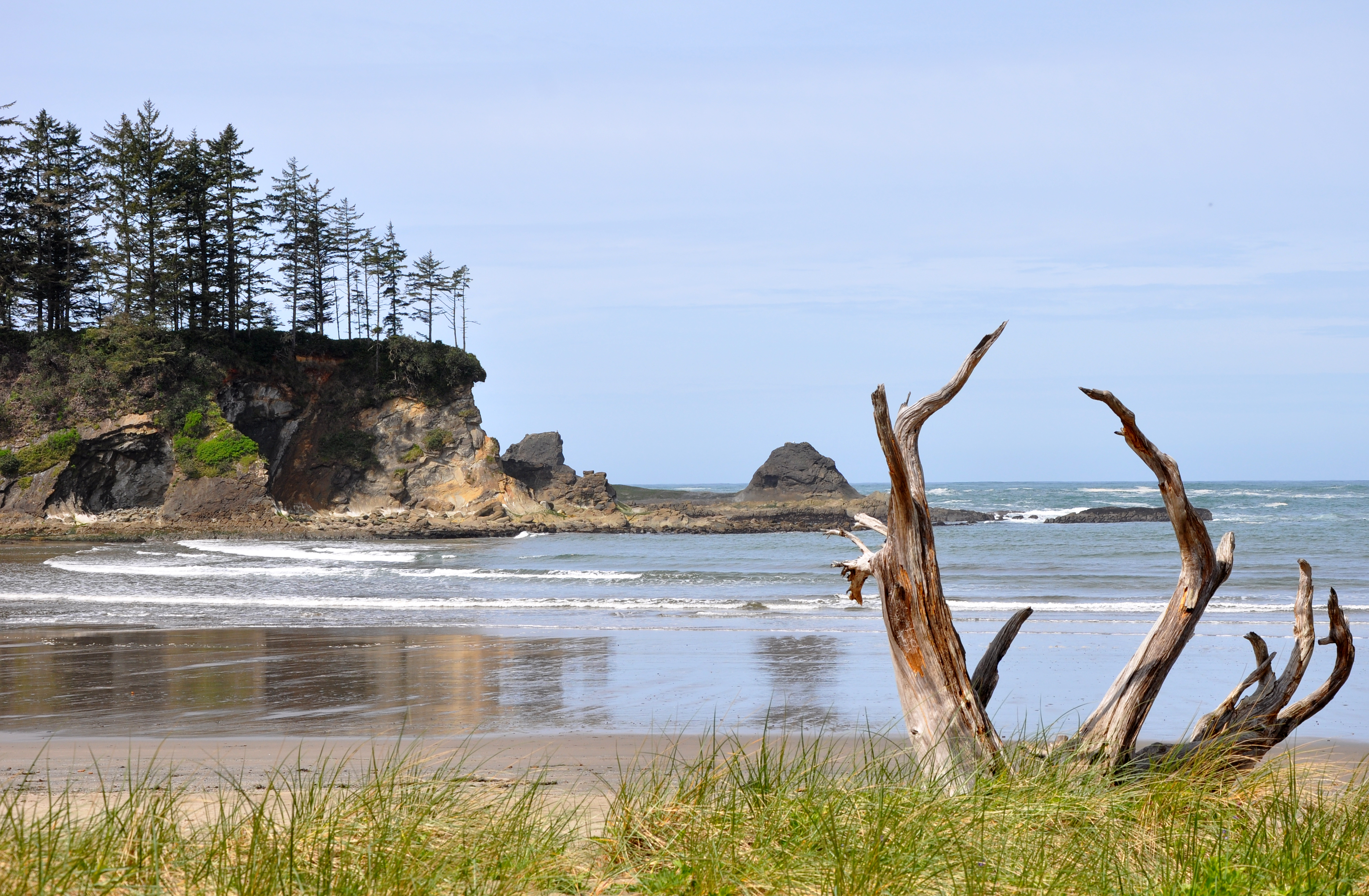
- View from the south end of the beach

- Location within Oregon Location within the United States
- Type: Public, state
- Nearest city: Coos Bay
- Coordinates: 43°20′3.70″N 124°22′14.73″W
- Area: 405 acres (164 ha)
- Created: 1948
- Operator: Oregon Parks and Recreation Department
- Visitors: Day-use: about 1.4 million annually. Overnight: about 70,000.
- Status: Open all year

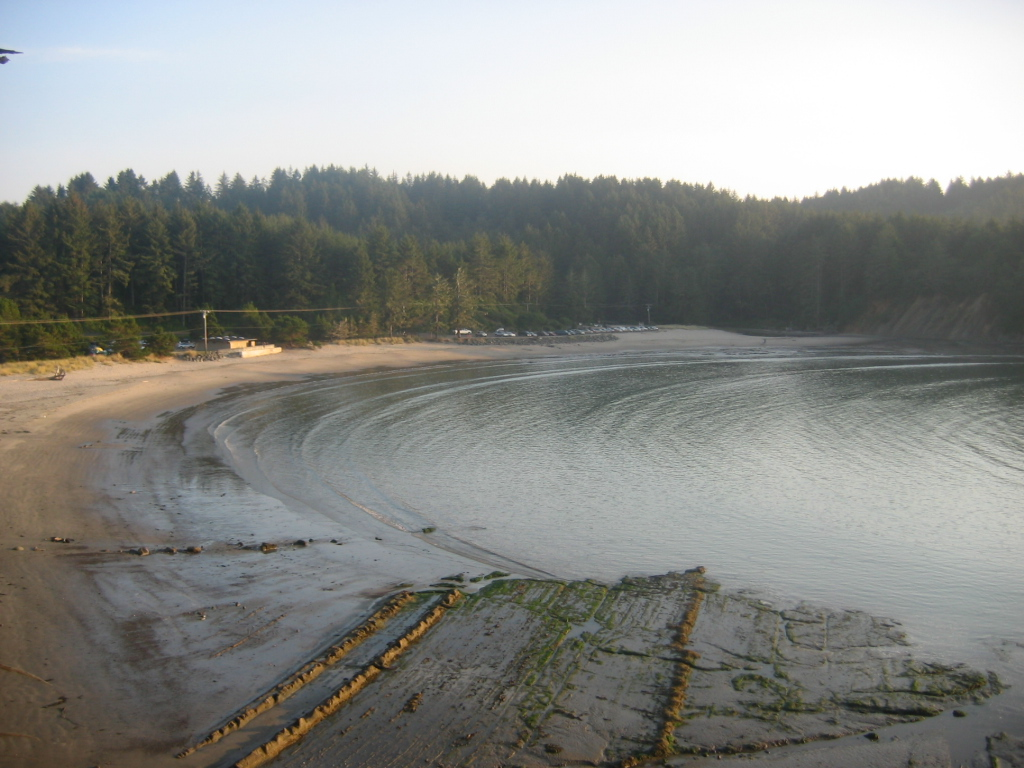
The bay from above

Sunset Bay State Park is a state park in the U.S. state of Oregon. Administered by the Oregon Parks and Recreation Department, it is about 0.4 miles (0.6 km) south of Cape Arago Lighthouse and 2.5 miles (4.0 km) outside the town of Charleston on Coos Bay. The park offers a crescent shaped beach, tide pools, hiking trails and a year-round campground.

The park is one of three along the Cape Arago Highway, which runs along the Pacific Ocean west of U.S. Route 101. Sunset Bay State Park is about 1 mile (1.6 km) north of Shore Acres State Park and about 2 miles (3 km) north of Cape Arago State Park. A hiking trail links Sunset Bay to Shore Acres.

Land for the park was acquired in stages through 1984. Coos County donated the original tract to the state in 1948. In 1954, Ralph Barker donated a parcel with a water supply. The Bureau of Land Management later added tracts through a grant to the state, which also bought, exchanged, or otherwise acquired land from private owners. The combined size of the parcels is about 405 acres (164 ha).

Sunset Bay is home to one of Oregon's ghost forests, created by an earthquake on the Cascadia subduction zone that dropped the shoreline about 1,200 years ago. The shoreline contains stumps of drowned spruce trees.

== Climate ==
Located on the Oregon Coast, Sunset Bay State Park has a mild oceanic climate (Cfb), with minimal temperature variation throughout the year. As is typical of coastal locations in Oregon, Sunset Bay is very wet, with nearly 65 inches (1,700 mm) of annual precipitation, the vast majority of it falling between the months of October and May. Summers are dry, but still cool, partly-to-mostly cloudy and foggy. Temperatures below 40 °F (4 °C) or above 70 °F (21 °C) are uncommon, while snowfall is fairly rare. The record high temperature at Sunset Bay State Park is 82 °F (28 °C), which was observed on both October 10, 1991 and February 8, 2016, while the record low is 15 °F (−9 °C), which was observed on December 21, 1990.

Climate data for Sunset Bay State Park
Month	Jan	Feb	Mar	Apr	May	Jun	Jul	Aug	Sep	Oct	Nov	Dec	Year
Record high °F (°C)	67 (19)	82 (28)	69 (21)	79 (26)	81 (27)	69 (21)	69 (21)	75 (24)	76 (24)	82 (28)	67 (19)	64 (18)	82 (28)
Mean daily maximum °F (°C)	52 (11)	52 (11)	52 (11)	53 (12)	56 (13)	58 (14)	59 (15)	61 (16)	59 (15)	58 (14)	55 (13)	52 (11)	56 (13)
Mean daily minimum °F (°C)	44 (7)	44 (7)	45 (7)	46 (8)	49 (9)	51 (11)	53 (12)	53 (12)	52 (11)	50 (10)	47 (8)	44 (7)	48 (9)
Record low °F (°C)	28 (−2)	18 (−8)	32 (0)	35 (2)	39 (4)	45 (7)	43 (6)	45 (7)	43 (6)	39 (4)	32 (0)	15 (−9)	15 (−9)
Average precipitation inches (mm)	7.7 (200)	9.3 (240)	9.4 (240)	6.1 (150)	2.8 (71)	2.0 (51)	0.4 (10)	0.5 (13)	1.7 (43)	5.3 (130)	8.9 (230)	10.6 (270)	64.7 (1,640)
Average snowfall inches (cm)	0.5 (1.3)	0.2 (0.51)	0 (0)	0 (0)	0 (0)	0 (0)	0 (0)	0 (0)	0 (0)	0 (0)	0.1 (0.25)	0.2 (0.51)	1.0 (2.5)
Average relative humidity (%)	81	82	81	82	85	88	93	95	94	89	86	83	87

== See also ==
- List of Oregon state parks
