= SS John B. Gordon =

World War II Liberty ship of the United States

History

United States
- Name: John B. Gordon
- Namesake: John B. Gordon
- Ordered: as type (EC2-S-C1) hull, MC hull 1504
- Builder: J.A. Jones Construction, Brunswick, Georgia
- Cost: $1,565,410
- Yard number: 120
- Way number: 4
- Laid down: 6 September 1943
- Launched: 16 November 1943
- Sponsored by: Mrs. Charles I. Allan
- Completed: 26 November 1943
- Identification: Call Signal: KUGA
- Fate: Laid up in National Defense Reserve Fleet, James River Group, Lee Hall, Virginia, 18 May 1946; Sold for scrapping, 15 September 1959

General characteristics
- Class & type: Liberty ship; type EC2-S-C1, standard
- Tonnage: 10,865 LT DWT; 7,176 GRT
- Displacement: 3,380 long tons (3,434 t) (light); 14,245 long tons (14,474 t) (max)
- Length: 441 feet 6 inches (135 m) oa; 416 feet (127 m) pp; 427 feet (130 m) lwl
- Beam: 57 feet (17 m)
- Draft: 27 ft 9.25 in (8.4646 m)
- Installed power: 2 × Oil fired 450 °F (232 °C) boilers, operating at 220 psi (1,500 kPa); 2,500 hp (1,900 kW)
- Propulsion: 1 × triple-expansion steam engine, (manufactured by Hamilton Engineering Works, Brunswick, Georgia); 1 × screw propeller
- Speed: 11.5 knots (21.3 km/h; 13.2 mph)
- Capacity: 562,608 cubic feet (15,931 m^{3}) (grain); 499,573 cubic feet (14,146 m^{3}) (bale)
- Complement: 38–62 USMM; 21–40 USNAG
- Armament: Varied by ship; Bow-mounted 3-inch (76 mm)/50-caliber gun; Stern-mounted 4-inch (102 mm)/50-caliber gun; 2–8 × single 20-millimeter (0.79 in) Oerlikon anti-aircraft (AA) cannons and/or, 2–8 × 37-millimeter (1.46 in) M1 AA guns

SS John B. Gordon was a Liberty ship built in the United States during World War II. She was named after John B. Gordon, a Confederate States Army general, United States Senator from Georgia, and 53rd Governor of Georgia.

== Construction ==
John B. Gordon was laid down on 6 September 1943, under a United States Maritime Commission (MARCOM) contract, MC hull 1504, by J.A. Jones Construction, Brunswick, Georgia; sponsored by Mrs. Charles I. Allan, sister-in-law of J.A. Jones acting president, Edwin Jones, and launched on 16 November 1943.

== History ==
She was allocated to T.J. Stevenson & Co., Inc., on 26 November 1943. On 18 May 1946, she was laid up in the National Defense Reserve Fleet in the James River Group, Lee Hall, Virginia. On 15 September 1959, she was sold to Bethlehem Steel, for $71,781, for scrapping. She was delivered on 23 September 1959.

== Bibliography ==
- "Jones Construction, Brunswick GA". ShipbuildingHistory.com. 13 October 2010.
- "Liberty Ships – World War II".
- Maritime Administration. "John B. Gordon". Ship History Database Vessel Status Card. U.S. Department of Transportation, Maritime Administration. Archived from the original on 12 December 2019.
- Davies, James (May 2004). "Specifications (As-Built)" (PDF). p. 23.
- "SS John B. Gordon".
