= USS Ibex (IX-119) =

History

United States
- Name: Nicholas Longworth; Ibex
- Namesake: Nicholas Longworth; The ibex
- Laid down: 16 October 1943
- Launched: 15 November 1943
- Commissioned: 13 December 1943
- Decommissioned: 28 June 1946
- Fate: Sold

General characteristics
- Displacement: 14,500 tons
- Length: 441 ft 6 in (134.57 m)
- Beam: 56 ft 11 in (17.35 m)
- Draught: 28 ft 4 in (8.64 m)
- Speed: 11 knots
- Complement: 176 officers and men
- Armament: 1 × 5-inch 38 caliber dual purpose gun; 1 × 3 in (76 mm) gun; 8 × 20 mm cannons

USS Ibex (IX-119), an Armadillo-class tanker designated an unclassified miscellaneous vessel, was the second ship of the United States Navy to be named for the ibex, a variety of wild goat found in Europe, Asia, and Africa. Her keel was laid down as Nicholas Longworth under a Maritime Commission contract (T. EC2-S-C1) by the California Shipbuilding Corporation in Wilmington, California, on 16 October 1943. She was renamed Ibex on 27 October, launched on 15 November sponsored by Mrs. A. T. Olson, acquired by the Navy 13 December 1943; and commissioned the same day.

After shakedown off the West Coast, Ibex departed San Pedro, California, on 23 January 1944, arriving Noumea, New Caledonia, on 18 February. Operating as a floating storage ship she transported gasoline and lube oil in the South Pacific for the next eight months. From October until the end of World War II she operated with Servron 8, Third Fleet, which supplied the fighting units during the most crucial months of the war.

After VJ Day she remained in the Far East servicing the occupation forces; then returned to the United States early in 1946. Ibex decommissioned at Norfolk, Virginia, on 28 June 1946 and was returned to the Maritime Commission on 30 June. In 1948 she was sold to T. J. Stevenson Company, Inc. and renamed Helen Stevenson.
