= SS William W. Loring =

World War II Liberty ship of the United States

History

United States
- Name: William W. Loring
- Namesake: William Wing Loring
- Owner: War Shipping Administration (WSA)
- Operator: T.J. Stevenson & Co., Inc.
- Ordered: as type (EC2-S-C1) hull, MC hull 1546
- Builder: J.A. Jones Construction, Panama City, Florida
- Cost: $1,349,138
- Yard number: 28
- Way number: 1
- Laid down: 29 November 1943
- Launched: 17 January 1944
- Completed: 7 March 1944
- Identification: Call Signal: KVVE
- Fate: Laid up in National Defense Reserve Fleet, Mobile, Alabama, 30 November 1945; Sold for scrapping, 18 September 1958

General characteristics
- Class & type: Liberty ship; type EC2-S-C1, standard
- Tonnage: 10,865 LT DWT; 7,176 GRT
- Displacement: 3,380 long tons (3,434 t) (light); 14,245 long tons (14,474 t) (max)
- Length: 441 feet 6 inches (135 m) oa; 416 feet (127 m) pp; 427 feet (130 m) lwl
- Beam: 57 feet (17 m)
- Draft: 27 ft 9.25 in (8.4646 m)
- Installed power: 2 × Oil fired 450 °F (232 °C) boilers, operating at 220 psi (1,500 kPa); 2,500 hp (1,900 kW)
- Propulsion: 1 × triple-expansion steam engine, (manufactured by General Machinery Corp., Hamilton, Ohio); 1 × screw propeller
- Speed: 11.5 knots (21.3 km/h; 13.2 mph)
- Capacity: 562,608 cubic feet (15,931 m^{3}) (grain); 499,573 cubic feet (14,146 m^{3}) (bale)
- Complement: 38–62 USMM; 21–40 USNAG
- Armament: Varied by ship; Bow-mounted 3-inch (76 mm)/50-caliber gun; Stern-mounted 4-inch (102 mm)/50-caliber gun; 2–8 × single 20-millimeter (0.79 in) Oerlikon anti-aircraft (AA) cannons and/or, 2–8 × 37-millimeter (1.46 in) M1 AA guns

SS William W. Loring was a Liberty ship built in the United States during World War II. She was named after William Wing Loring, a Colonel in the United States Army that fought in the Mexican–American War. He joined the Confederate States Army during the American Civil War reaching the rank of Major General. After the war he was recommended to Isma'il Pasha, by William Tecumseh Sherman, for his army in Egypt, where he also obtained the rank of Major General.

== Construction ==
William W. Loring was laid down on 29 November 1943, under a United States Maritime Commission (MARCOM) contract, MC hull 1546, by J.A. Jones Construction, Panama City, Florida; she was launched on 17 January 1944.

== History ==
She was allocated to T.J. Stevenson & Co., Inc., on 7 March 1944. On 30 November 1945, she was laid up in the National Defense Reserve Fleet, in Mobile, Alabama. On 18 September 1958, she was sold, along with 34 other ships, for $2,666,680 to Bethlehem Steel, for scrapping. She was removed from the fleet on 23 October 1958.

== Bibliography ==
- "Jones Construction, Panama City FL". ShipbuildingHistory.com. 13 October 2010.
- "Liberty Ships – World War II".
- Maritime Administration. "William W. Loring". Ship History Database Vessel Status Card. U.S. Department of Transportation, Maritime Administration. Archived from the original on 12 December 2019.
- Davies, James (May 2004). "Specifications (As-Built)" (PDF). p. 23.
- "SS William W. Loring".
