= USS Gemsbok (IX-117) =

History

United States
- Name: USS Gemsbok
- Namesake: Gemsbok antelope
- Owner: United States Navy
- Builder: California Shipbuilding Corporation
- Laid down: 1943
- Launched: 9 November 1943
- Acquired: 3 December 1943
- Commissioned: 3 December 1943
- Decommissioned: 30 April 1946
- In service: 12 January 1944
- Out of service: 2 March 1944
- Reclassified: 11 May 1946 as the SS Carl R. Gray
- Stricken: 10 March 1966
- Fate: Sold commercial 1946, scrapped 1966

General characteristics
- Class & type: Armadillo-class tanker
- Type: IX
- Displacement: 14,500 t (14,300 long tons; 16,000 short tons)
- Length: 441 ft 6 in (134.57 m)
- Beam: 56 ft 11 in (17.35 m)
- Draft: 28 ft 4 in (8.64 m)
- Speed: 11.8 knots
- Complement: 110 officers and men
- Armament: One single 5"/38 dual purpose gun mount; One single 3"/50 dual purpose gun mount; Eight (8)single 20mm AA gun mounts

USS Gemsbok (IX-117), an Armadillo-class tanker designated an unclassified miscellaneous vessel, was the second ship of the United States Navy to be named for the gemsbok, a large, handsome species of straight-horned African antelope. Her keel was laid down as Carl R. Gray by the California Shipbuilding Corporation, in Wilmington, Los Angeles. She was launched on 9 November 1943 sponsored by Miss E. Jeffers, acquired and simultaneously commissioned on 3 December 1943. She was renamed Gemsbok upon acquisition.

Gemsbok sailed 12 January 1944 for the Marshall Islands and until May 1945 delivered fuel oil, aviation gasoline, and lube oil to warships in that archipelago and in the Mariana Islands. Her principal base of operations was Eniwetok but in addition Gemsbok supplied fuel at Majuro and Kwajalein, and from 5 July to 16 September 1944 was at Saipan servicing ships engaged in the capture and occupation of bases in the Marianas.

She sailed from Eniwetok on 11 May 1945 with fuel oil for Leyte, arriving 25 May via Ulithi. After Ulithi, she sailed from Leyte on 29 September for Okinawa and Hiro Wan, Japan, where she put in 16 October. Gemsbok continued her fueling duties at Nagoya and subsequently sailed for the United States on 20 December, reaching Norfolk, Virginia, on 28 February 1946 via San Diego, California, and Mobile, Alabama. Decommissioned there 30 April 1946, Gemsbok was stricken from the Naval Vessel Register on 8 May 1946 and subsequently sold to Maris Transportation System Inc. and in 1948 renamed Alpha operated by T. J. Stevenson & Company, Inc.
