= Conde McCullough Memorial Bridge =

North Bend Bridge
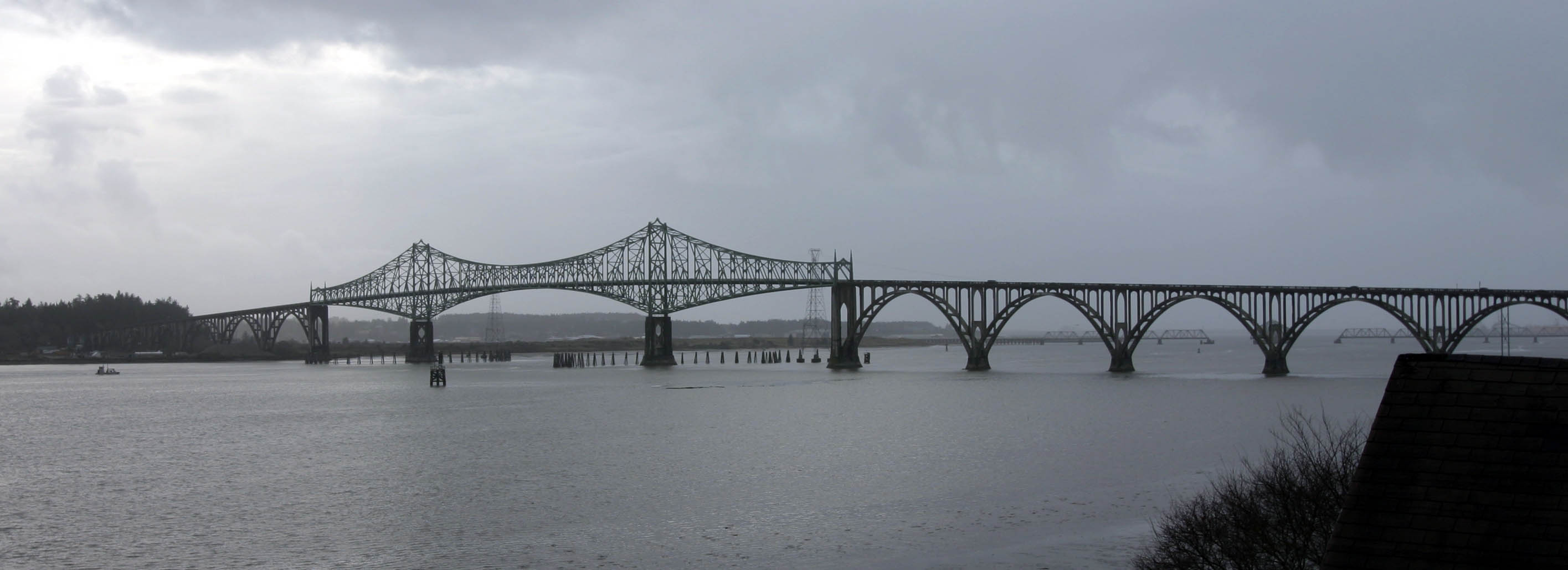
- Coordinates: 43°25′44″N 124°13′19″W
- Carries: US 101
- Crosses: Coos Bay
- Locale: North Bend, Oregon
- Official name: Conde B. McCullough Memorial Bridge
- Maintained by: Oregon DOT

Characteristics
- Design: Cantilever through-truss
- Total length: 5,305 ft (1,617.0 m)
- Longest span: 793 ft (241.7 m)
- Clearance below: 150 ft (45.7 m)

History
- Opened: 1936

Location
- Interactive map of North Bend Bridge

- North Bend Bridge No. 01823
- U.S. National Register of Historic Places
- Built: 1934–36
- MPS: McCullough, C. B., Major Oregon Coast Highway Bridges, 1927-1936
- NRHP reference No.: 05000817
- Added to NRHP: August 5, 2005

The Conde B. McCullough Memorial Bridge, is a cantilever bridge that spans the Coos Bay on U.S. Route 101 near North Bend, Oregon. When completed in 1936 it was named the North Bend Bridge. In 1947, it was renamed in honor of Conde B. McCullough who died on May 5, 1946. This and ten other major bridges on the Oregon Coast Highway were designed under his supervision.

The Conde B. McCullough Memorial Bridge replaced ferries that had formerly crossed the bay. The bridge is outstanding for its attention to form and detail, and has been placed on the National Register of Historic Places in recognition of its design and cultural and economic importance.

== History ==
Work started on what was then called the North Bend Bridge on July 10, 1934. Glenn S. Paxson, Acting State Bridge Engineer while McCullough took a leave of absence to work on projects in Central America, was the supervising engineer during construction. The resident engineer was Raymond Archibald until 1935, when he joined McCullough, then Dexter R. Smith. The Northwest Roads Company of Portland, Oregon, built the piers and the concrete structure. The steel sections of the bridge were built by the Virginia Bridge and Iron Company. The main piers are supported on piles driven into the bay's bed. The main towers of the cantilever section were fabricated off-site and moved to the bridge site in four sections. Work on the cantilever arms moved out in both directions from the tower, with the shoreward arm keeping slightly ahead of the center arm so that it would rest on a temporary support structure to stabilize the bridge. The concrete arch sections were erected using timber falsework. The bridge opened in June 1936.

When the bridge was completed in 1936, it was the longest bridge in Oregon. It was the costliest of the Oregon Coast bridges at $2.14 million (equivalent to approximately $35 million in 2012). Because the five largest bridges on the coastal route were so expensive, their construction was largely funded by the Public Works Administration. The North Bend Bridge was dedicated to its designer, Conde McCullough, in 1947.

The McCullough Bridge was damaged on December 4, 1986, when a Swedish ship, the Elgaren, struck the bottom of the center span. The ship was entering the harbor on a day when the tide was 3 feet (0.91 m) above normal, and was unable to lower a vertically stowed ramp in time after the ramp's mechanism malfunctioned. The bridge was closed for repairs.

== Description ==
Because of the long spans and heavily trafficked shipping channel, a cantilever construction was deemed most suitable; a draw span was rejected because it would have to be opened too often. Consequently, the 793-foot (242 m) main span has 145 feet (44 m) of vertical clearance and is part of a 1,708-foot-long (521 m) steel cantilever span. The overall length, including the concrete approach spans, is 5,305 feet (1,617 m). The approach spans are concrete arches more typical of McCullough's designs. The main roadway is 27 feet (8.2 m) wide with 3.5-foot-wide (1.1 m) sidewalks on either side. The main towers rise 280 feet (85 m) above the water surface, with curved sway bracing in a Gothic arch style. The open-spandrel concrete approach arches vary in span from 265 feet (81 m) to 151 feet (46 m). The ends of the bridge are marked by pedestrian plazas meant to provide a viewing point for the bridge and to provide access to the shoreline. These plazas are detailed with Art Moderne motifs and are provided with built-in benches. The stairs descend in sweeping curves to the park below.

== Designation ==
The city of North Bend, Oregon, uses images of the bridge extensively in public relations material. The bridge was placed on the National Register of Historic Places on August 5, 2005.

== Images ==
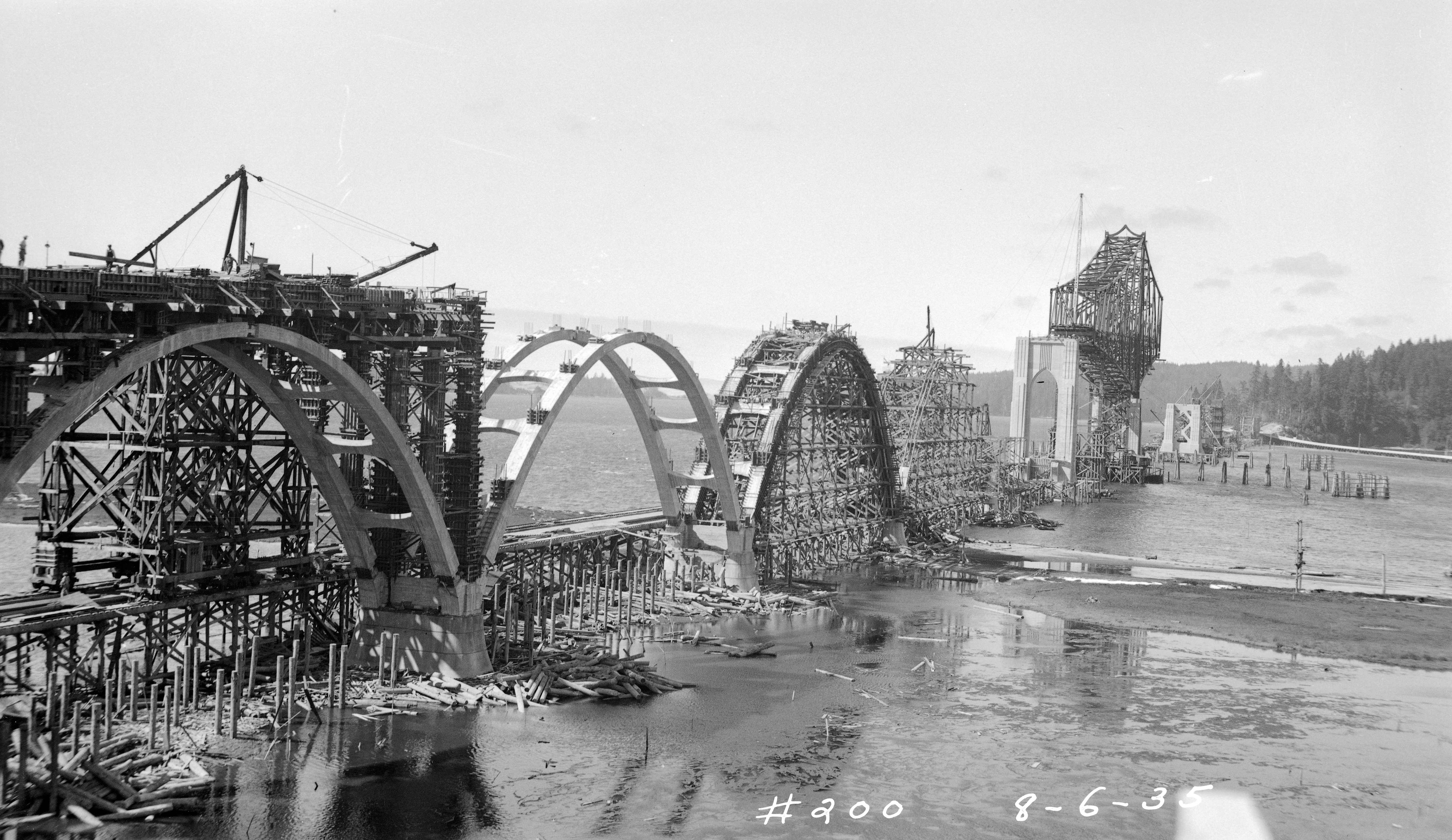
Construction, 1935

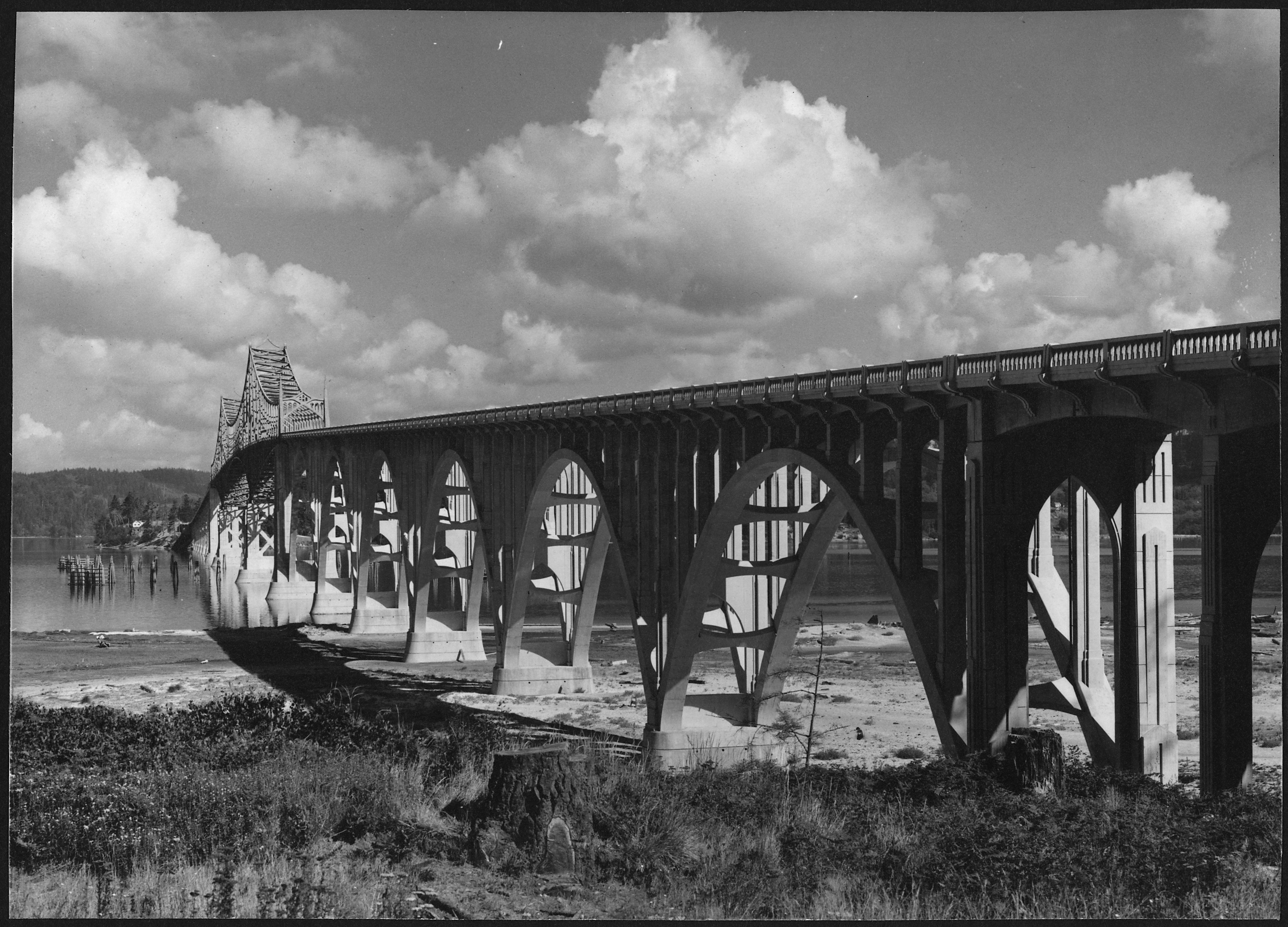
The bridge in 1938

== See also ==
- List of bridges documented by the Historic American Engineering Record in Oregon
- List of bridges on the National Register of Historic Places in Oregon
- List of bridges on U.S. Route 101 in Oregon
- National Register of Historic Places listings in Coos County, Oregon
