= USS Valencia =

Cargo ship of the United States Navy

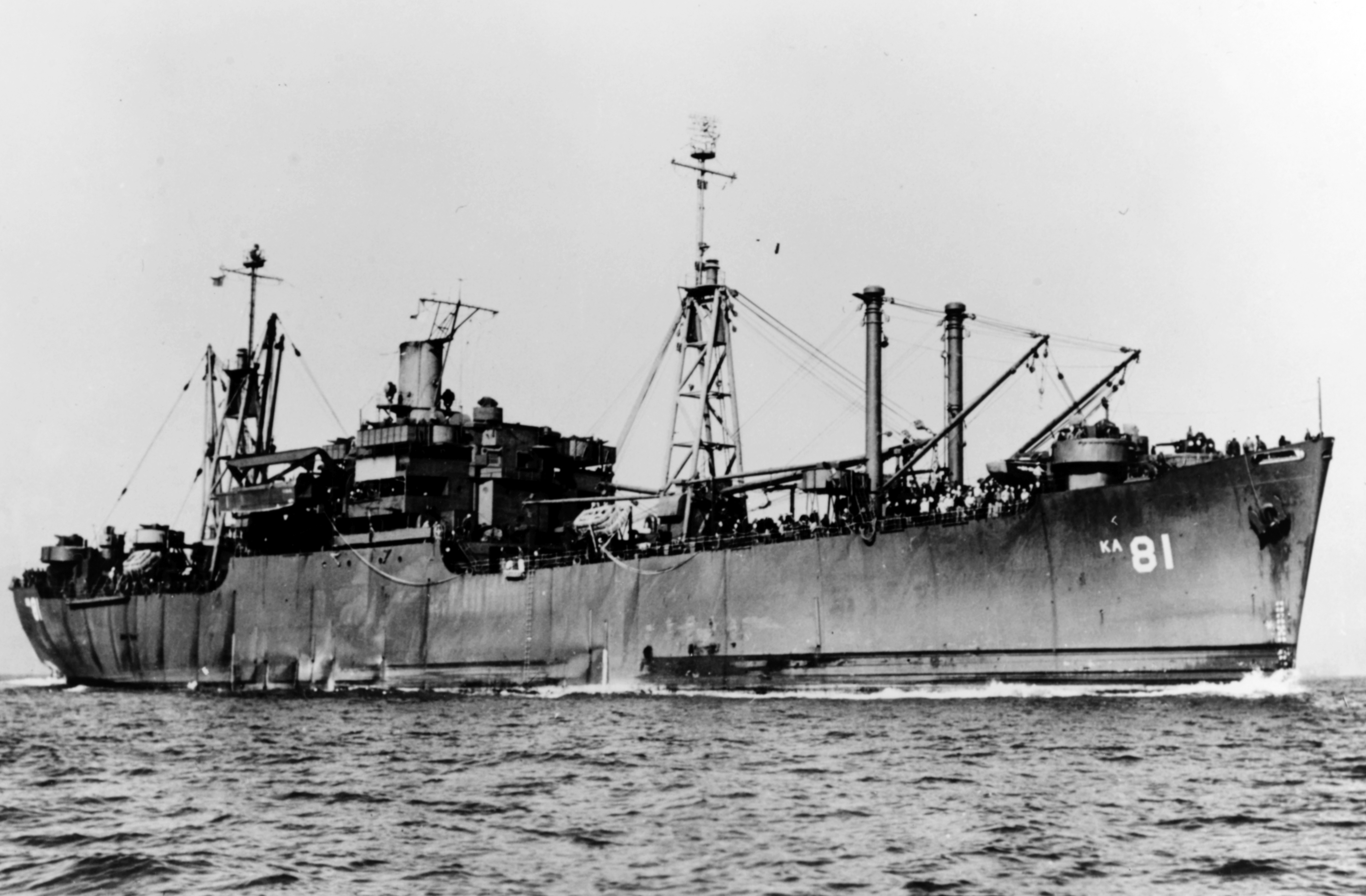

History

United States
- Name: USS Valencia
- Namesake: Valencia County, New Mexico
- Builder: North Carolina Shipbuilding Company, Wilmington, North Carolina
- Laid down: 20 May 1944
- Launched: 22 July 1944
- Commissioned: 9 January 1945
- Decommissioned: 8 May 1946
- Renamed: SS Genevieve Lykes; SS Garden State
- Stricken: 21 May 1946
- Honors and awards: 1 battle star (World War II)
- Fate: Sold into merchant service, 1946; Scrapped May 1970

General characteristics
- Class & type: Tolland-class attack cargo ship
- Displacement: 13,910 long tons (14,133 t) full
- Length: 459 ft 2 in (139.95 m)
- Beam: 63 ft (19 m)
- Draft: 26 ft 4 in (8.03 m)
- Speed: 16.5 knots (30.6 km/h; 19.0 mph)
- Complement: 395
- Armament: 1 × 5"/38 caliber gun; 4 × twin 40 mm guns; 16 × 20 mm guns

USS Valencia (AKA-81) was a Tolland-class attack cargo ship in service with the United States Navy from 1945 to 1946. She was sold into commercial service and was scrapped in 1970.

== History ==
Valencia was named after Valencia County, New Mexico. She was laid down as a Type C2-S-AJ3 ship under a Maritime Commission contract (MC hull 1389) on 20 May 1944 at Wilmington, North Carolina, by the North Carolina Shipbuilding Co.; launched on 22 July 1944; sponsored by Mrs. C. L. Merritt; acquired by the Navy on 18 August 1944; converted for Navy use by the Bethlehem Steel shipyard, Key Highway plant, Baltimore, Maryland; and commissioned there on 9 January 1945.

== Service history ==
=== World War II, 1944–1945 ===
Following fitting out, shakedown, and initial exercises in the Hampton Roads area, Valencia got underway from the Naval Operating Base, Norfolk, Virginia, at 0938 on 10 February, in company with Medea (AKA-31), bound for the Canal Zone. The ships transited the Panama Canal on the 17th and proceeded on to the Hawaiian Islands, making port at Pearl Harbor on 2 March.

Shifting to Honolulu on the 8th, Valencia moored at the Army Transport Dock and loaded a total of 145 officers and enlisted men before getting underway on the 14th for the Marshalls. Escorted by PC-1139 up to a point 30 miles from Pearl Harbor, the attack cargo ship proceeded independently for the remainder of her passage and arrived at Eniwetok on 22 March. Again traveling singly, Valencia got underway for the southern Carolines three days later and arrived off Ulithi after a week's voyage. However, a typhoon prevented her from entering the harbor; and she steamed away from the storm center at slow speeds until early on the following day, when quieter seas and improved visibility permitted her to reach her destination.

She remained at Ulithi from 1 to 13 April, preparing for participation in her first operation. Valencia got underway for Okinawa at 1617 on the 13th, in Division "Able" of Task Group 55.8, in company with Okanogan (APA-220), Jerauld (APA-174), Lenoir (AKA-74), Lumen (AKA-30), SS Kelso Victory, and SS Typhoon. The four-day passage was highlighted by a suspected submarine contact which sent all ships to general quarters and by the sighting of a stray mine which escort vessels destroyed.

Valencia anchored off Hagushi beach, Okinawa, at 0921 on 17 April, commenced discharging cargo at 1815, and ceased at 1945. All ships began making smoke at 2024, upon receipt of an air raid alert, completely covering the anchorage area within a few moments. Valencia later observed antiaircraft fire from the forces ashore and noted reports of enemy aircraft being in the vicinity two or three times, before securing from general quarters at 2239. Due to prevailing heavy surf conditions, the beaches were closed to landings on the 19th, as high winds kicked up heavy seas which greatly hampered unloading. Heavy swells continued to hinder operations into subsequent days, as rough seas made it difficult to hold boats alongside, sweeping them against the steel hide of the ship. Despite this handicap and two "red alerts" on the evenings of 20 and 21 April, the crew, aided by a force of 83 marines (two officers and 81 enlisted men) managed to unload the ship's cargo by evening on the 21st.

Valencia engaged in hoisting in her boats and making ready for sea throughout the night of the 21st and commenced disembarking her marine stevedoring party at 0620 on the 22nd. Another "red alert" interrupted the boat-hoisting process at 0710, but the resumption of the task at 0900, when the "all clear" was sounded, enabled the ship to soon be ready for sea. Accordingly, the ship got underway at 1317 on 22 April for the Marianas in Task Unit 51.29.20.

Arriving at Saipan on 1 May, Valencia transferred most of her landing craft (LCVP's, LCPL's, and LCM's) to the boat pool and got underway for Nouméa, New Caledonia, on the 3d. She loaded Army equipment; Navy construction battalion vehicles and equipment; and embarked passengers for destinations on the cargo ship's itinerary. Valencia, got underway at 1508 on 20 May and, between that time and her arrival at Eniwetok on the 30th, called at Guadalcanal and Tulagi, embarking and debarking passengers and picking up new boats. She remained at Eniwetok from 1 to 26 June, awaiting orders, before getting underway for the Marianas. She reached Guam at 1900 on 29 June to unload LCVP's, vehicles, and general cargo at Apra Harbor.

The attack cargo ship then shifted to Tanapag Harbor, Guam, to finish unloading before proceeding on to the West Coast of the United States, dropping anchor in San Francisco Bay on 31 July. Valencia remained at anchor until the 9th, when she shifted to Pier 90-B, San Francisco, to begin loading general cargo earmarked for the Philippines. During this time, the war in the Pacific came to an end after Japan, reeling from the steady Allied pounding and two atomic bombs, capitulated on 15 August 1945.

=== Post-war activities, 1945–1946 ===
Sailing for the Philippines on 18 August, Valencia arrived off Samar on 6 September, unloaded all holds by the 19th, and subsequently moved on to Manila Bay, Subic Bay, and Lingayen Gulf in succession. Subsequently, the attack cargo ship embarked men and equipment of the 25th Division of the 6th Army for occupation duty in Japan. On 1 October, she got underway for Wakayama as part of TU 54.8.1. Detached from the convoy for a brief period on 6 October to destroy a floating unidentified object, she expended 292 rounds of 20 millimeter ammunition before resuming her passage with the group — her mission completed.

Arriving off Honshū on the 7th, Valencia remained in the Wakayama area until the 25th. During this period, a typhoon passed just west of the anchorage area of Wakanoura Wan on 10 October and 11 October. Winds up to 90 knots swept across the bay, forcing Valencia to ride out the typhoon by using her anchors and main engines. Her mission at Wakayama completed by the 25th, the attack cargo vessel got underway on that date for Nagoya, Japan. After transiting the swept channel to the ship's destination, she anchored first off Yokkaichi Ko — the transport anchorage — and then shifted to alongside a pier where she discharged cargo, troops, and eight Army LCM's, and remained until the 14th. Having embarked 268 men for transportation to the United States on the 13th, the ship got underway on the 14th for San Francisco.

While en route, the destination of the ship was changed to Portland, Oregon, and she made port there on 28 November. Remaining at Portland until 17 December, the ship shifted to San Francisco and then conducted one round-trip voyage to Pearl Harbor and back before departing the West Coast on 14 February 1946 for the East Coast. Transiting the Panama Canal on the 24th, Valencia arrived at New York City on 3 March, via Little Creek, Virginia, before proceeding back to the Hampton Roads vicinity and arriving at the Norfolk Navy Yard on the 7th.

=== Decommissioning and fate ===
Decommissioned on 8 May 1946, the ship was delivered to the War Shipping Administration, Maritime Commission, five days later. Her name was struck from the Navy List on 21 May 1946.

Acquired by the Lykes Lines, the vessel was renamed SS Genevieve Lykes and entered mercantile service soon thereafter. Acquired by T. J. Stevenson & Company, Inc., of New York City, in 1947, the vessel was renamed Garden City. She remained in service with this firm until her name disappeared from the merchant registers in 1971.

== Awards ==
Valencia received one battle star for her World War II service.
