= SS Stephen Beasley =

Liberty ship of WWII

History

United States
- Name: Stephen Beasley
- Namesake: Stephen Beasley
- Owner: War Shipping Administration (WSA)
- Operator: T.J. Stevenson & Co., Inc.
- Ordered: as type (EC2-S-C1) hull, MC hull 2483
- Awarded: 23 April 1943
- Builder: St. Johns River Shipbuilding Company, Jacksonville, Florida
- Cost: $1,155,623
- Yard number: 47
- Way number: 5
- Laid down: 13 May 1944
- Launched: 24 June 1944
- Sponsored by: Eleanor Garrett Bunker
- Completed: 13 July 1944
- Identification: Call sign: WQGA
- Fate: Laid up in the National Defense Reserve Fleet, Beaumont, Texas, 17 December 1948; Sold for scrapping, 14 March 1961, removed from the fleet, 28 March 1961

General characteristics
- Class & type: Liberty ship; type EC2-S-C1, standard
- Tonnage: 10,865 LT DWT; 7,176 GRT
- Displacement: 3,380 long tons (3,434 t) (light); 14,245 long tons (14,474 t) (max)
- Length: 441 feet 6 inches (135 m) oa; 416 feet (127 m) pp; 427 feet (130 m) lwl
- Beam: 57 feet (17 m)
- Draft: 27 ft 9.25 in (8.4646 m)
- Installed power: 2 × Oil fired 450 °F (232 °C) boilers, operating at 220 psi (1,500 kPa); 2,500 hp (1,900 kW)
- Propulsion: 1 × triple-expansion steam engine, (manufactured by Joshua Hendy Iron Works, Sunnyvale, California); 1 × screw propeller
- Speed: 11.5 knots (21.3 km/h; 13.2 mph)
- Capacity: 562,608 cubic feet (15,931 m^{3}) (grain); 499,573 cubic feet (14,146 m^{3}) (bale)
- Complement: 38–62 USMM; 21–40 USNAG
- Armament: Varied by ship; Bow-mounted 3-inch (76 mm)/50-caliber gun; Stern-mounted 4-inch (102 mm)/50-caliber gun; 2–8 × single 20-millimeter (0.79 in) Oerlikon anti-aircraft (AA) cannons and/or, 2–8 × 37-millimeter (1.46 in) M1 AA guns

SS Stephen Beasley was a Liberty ship built in the United States during World War II. She was named after Stephen Beasley, an American shipbuilder from Philadelphia, Pennsylvania, during the early years of the Republic.

== Construction ==
Stephen Beasley was laid down on 13 May 1944, under a Maritime Commission (MARCOM) contract, MC hull 2483, by the St. Johns River Shipbuilding Company, Jacksonville, Florida; sponsored by Eleanor Garrett Bunker, the wife of Rear Admiral Charles W.O. Bunker and the great-great-granddaughter of the namesake, and was launched on 24 June 1944.

== History ==
She was allocated to the T.J. Stevenson & Co., Inc., on 13 July 1944. On 17 December 1948, she was laid up in the National Defense Reserve Fleet, Beaumont, Texas. She was sold for scrapping, 14 March 1961, to Luria Bros. and Co., for $61,789.22. She was removed from the fleet on 28 March 1961.

== Bibliography ==
- "St. John's River Shipbuilding, Jacksonville FL". www.ShipbuildingHistory.com. 16 October 2010.
- Maritime Administration. "Stephen Beasley". Ship History Database Vessel Status Card. U.S. Department of Transportation, Maritime Administration.
- Davies, James (May 2004). "Specifications (As-Built)" (PDF). p. 23.
- "SS Stephen Beasley".
