= Cape Arago Lighthouse =

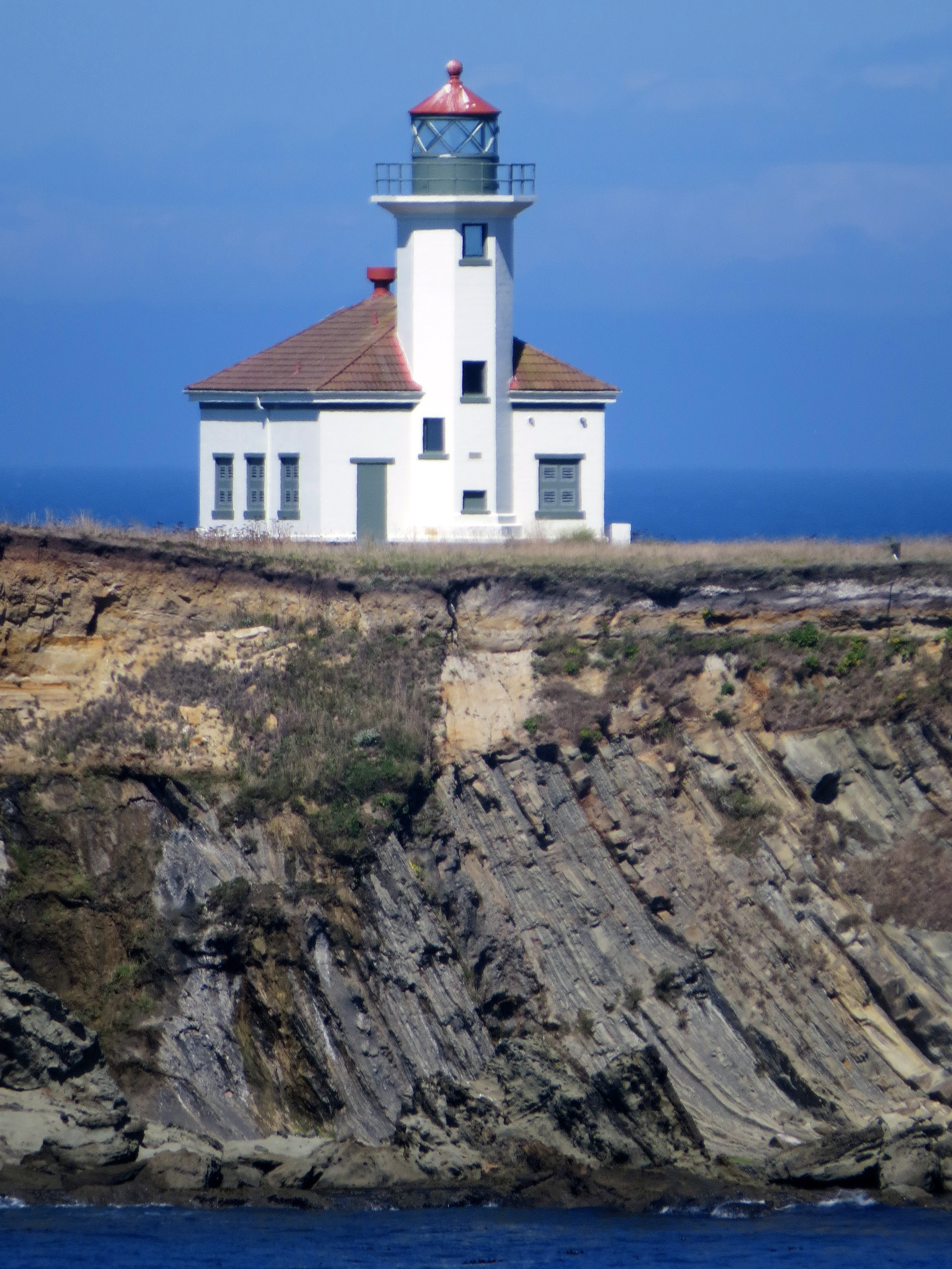
- Cape Arago Lighthouse
- Location: Gregory Point, Charleston, Oregon
- Coordinates: 43.34123°N 124.37543°W

Tower
- Constructed: 1866
- Foundation: Concrete
- Construction: Reinforced concrete
- Automated: 1966
- Height: 44 feet (13 m)
- Shape: Octagonal attached to fog signal building
- Heritage: National Register of Historic Places listed place

Light
- First lit: 1934
- Deactivated: 2006
- Focal height: 13 m (43 ft)
- Lens: Fourth order Fresnel
- Range: 14 nautical miles; 26 kilometres (16 mi)
- Characteristic: Group Flash White, 20 seconds 3 Flashes
- Cape Arago Lighthouse
- U.S. National Register of Historic Places
- MPS: Lighthouse Stations of Oregon MPS
- NRHP reference No.: 73002338
- Added to NRHP: May 13, 1993

The Cape Arago Lighthouse (formerly known as Cape Gregory Lighthouse) is a lighthouse located in Charleston, Oregon. It is located 2.6 miles (4.2 km) north of Cape Arago.

== History ==
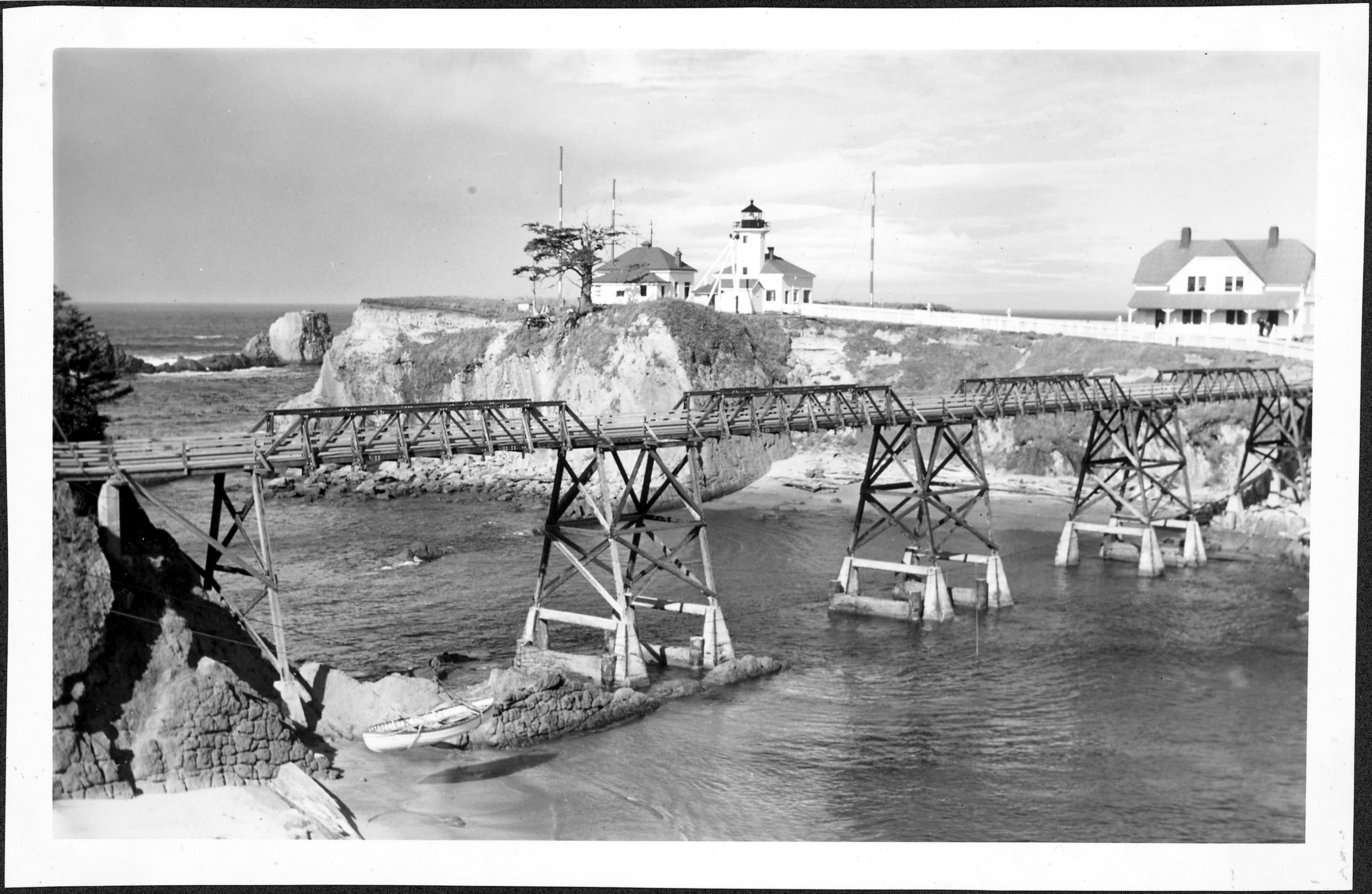
October, 1944

Starting in the mid-19th century, Coos Bay had become an important shipping point on the west coast of the United States. The amount of shipping at the time warranted the building of a light at the location, and in 1864, funds were given to build the harbor's light. In 1866, the first light was illuminated. This first tower, which housed a fourth-order Fresnel lens, was nothing more than a 25-foot (7.6 m) octagonal tower with a skeleton base. This tower, located on the west end of an island, was connected to the keeper's residence via a 1,300-foot (400 m) wooden walkway. However, because of its location on the island, the light was greatly exposed to the elements along the Pacific and soon was in need of repairs. Over the next 35 years, much of the station's infrastructure had to be repaired or replaced. Several improvements were also made during this time, including the installation of a fog signal and a new boathouse.

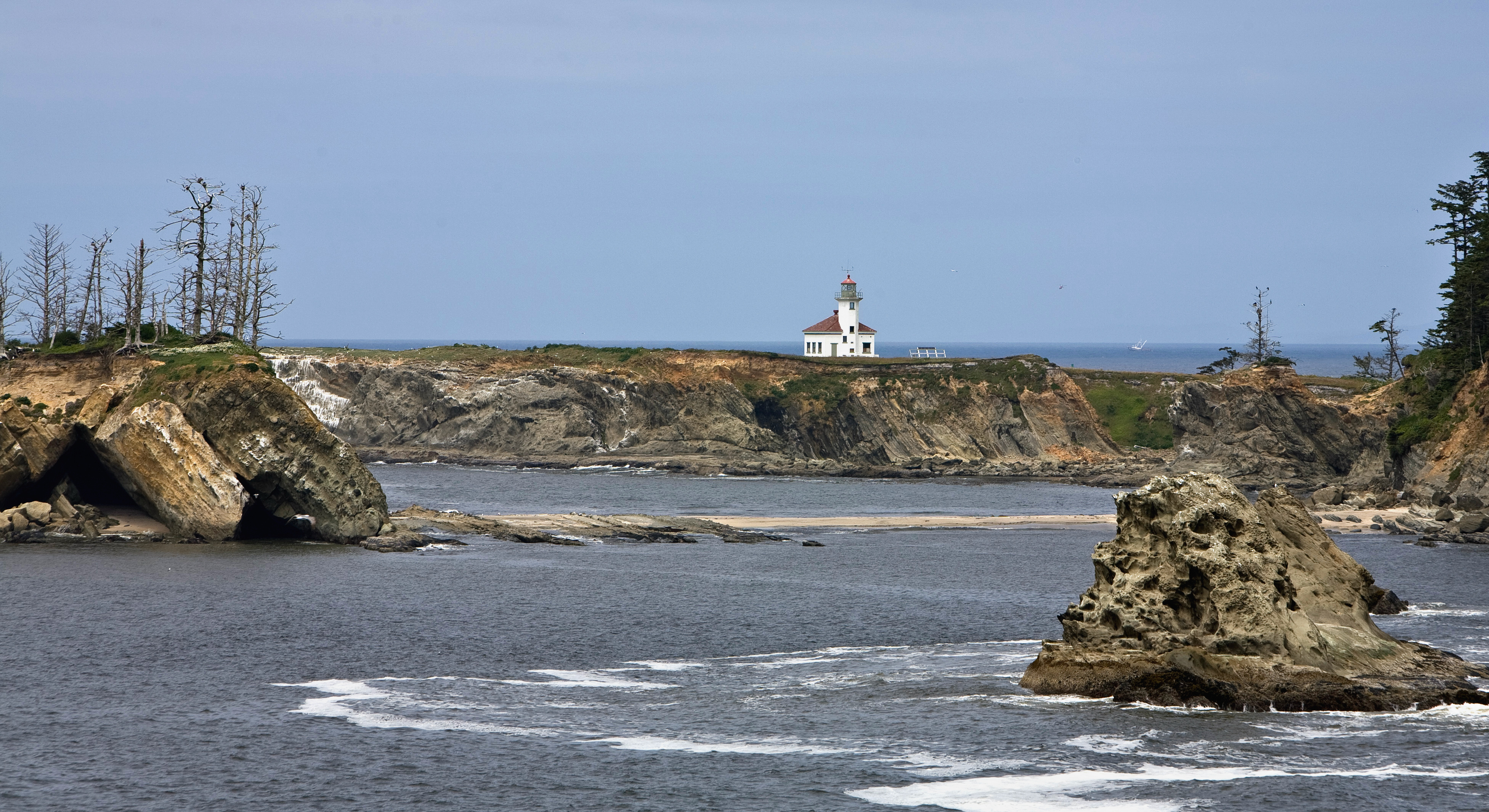
Cape Arago Lighthouse

However, sailor's demands for a better light and the threat of erosion meant the end of the first tower, and in 1909, the second tower was lit. Located higher on the island, the new wooden tower stood 100 feet (30 m) tall and provided better illumination. Designed by Carl Leick, the new light was similar in design to Mukilteo Light in the state of Washington. Erosion eventually threatened this light as well, and in 1934, the third light was illuminated.

Containing the second light's fourth-order lens, the third tower was made from concrete to better withstand the inclement weather of the area. This light shared a basic design with Point Robinson Light in Washington. It was also at this time that the first tower, which still stood, was finally destroyed. The second light fared better. The tower was soon removed and the building was converted into an office.

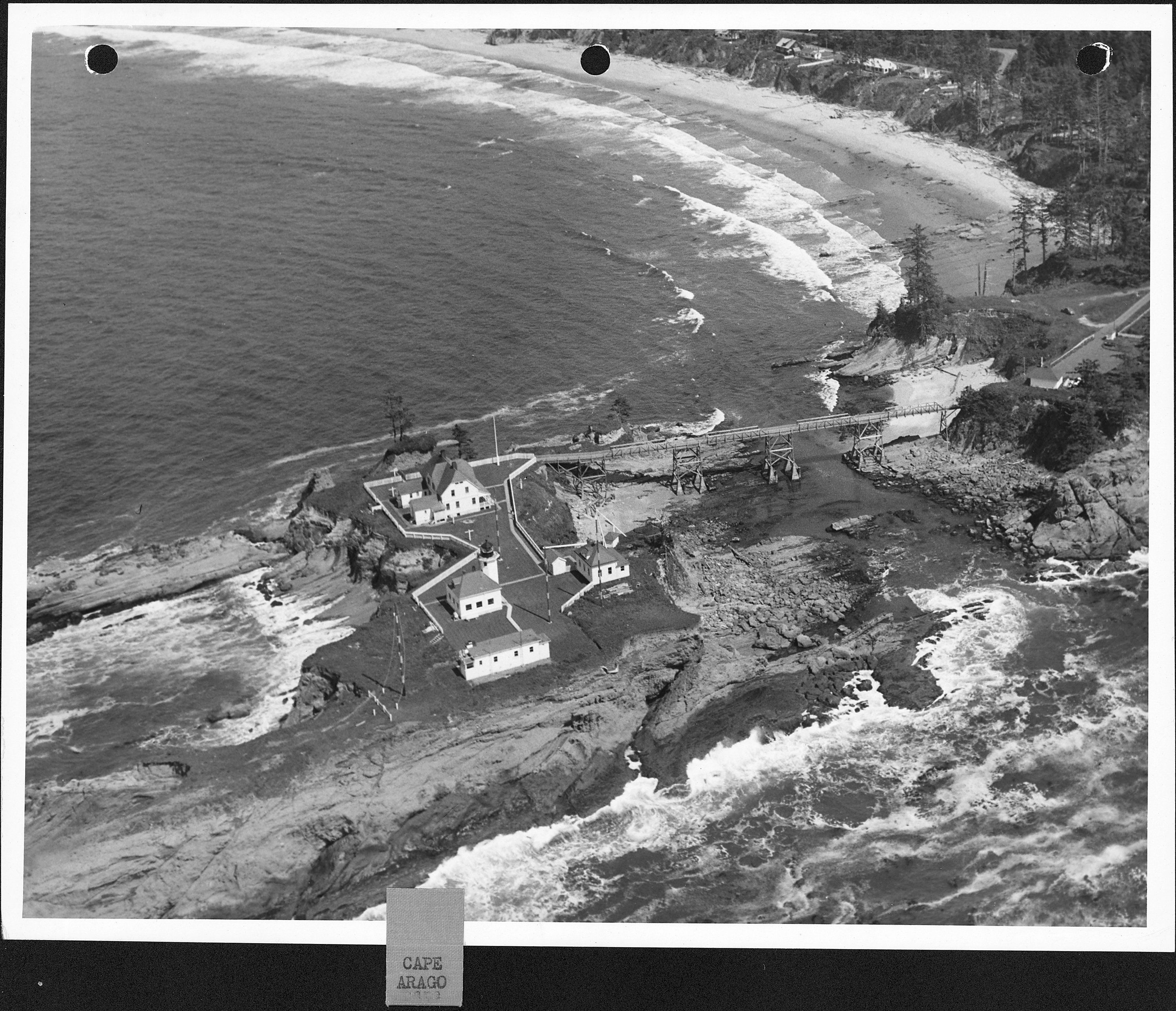
Cape Arago Lighthouse, 1947

In 1966, the light was automated. Eventually, in 1993, the Fresnel lens was replaced with a modern lens. The light remained a beacon into Coos Bay for the next 12 years, until its decommissioning on January 1, 2006. Today, only the third light remains standing, all other buildings having since been demolished. The site is not open to the public, and the entire area is fenced off. In 2012–2013 winter, the original wood bridge accessing the light was eroded away by the sea. The lighthouse is visible between Sunset Bay State Park and Shore Acres State Park, and from Bastendorff Beach County Park.

In 1993, the light was listed on the National Register of Historic Places.

== See also ==
- List of lighthouses on the Oregon Coast
