= Cape Arago State Park =

State park in Oregon, United States

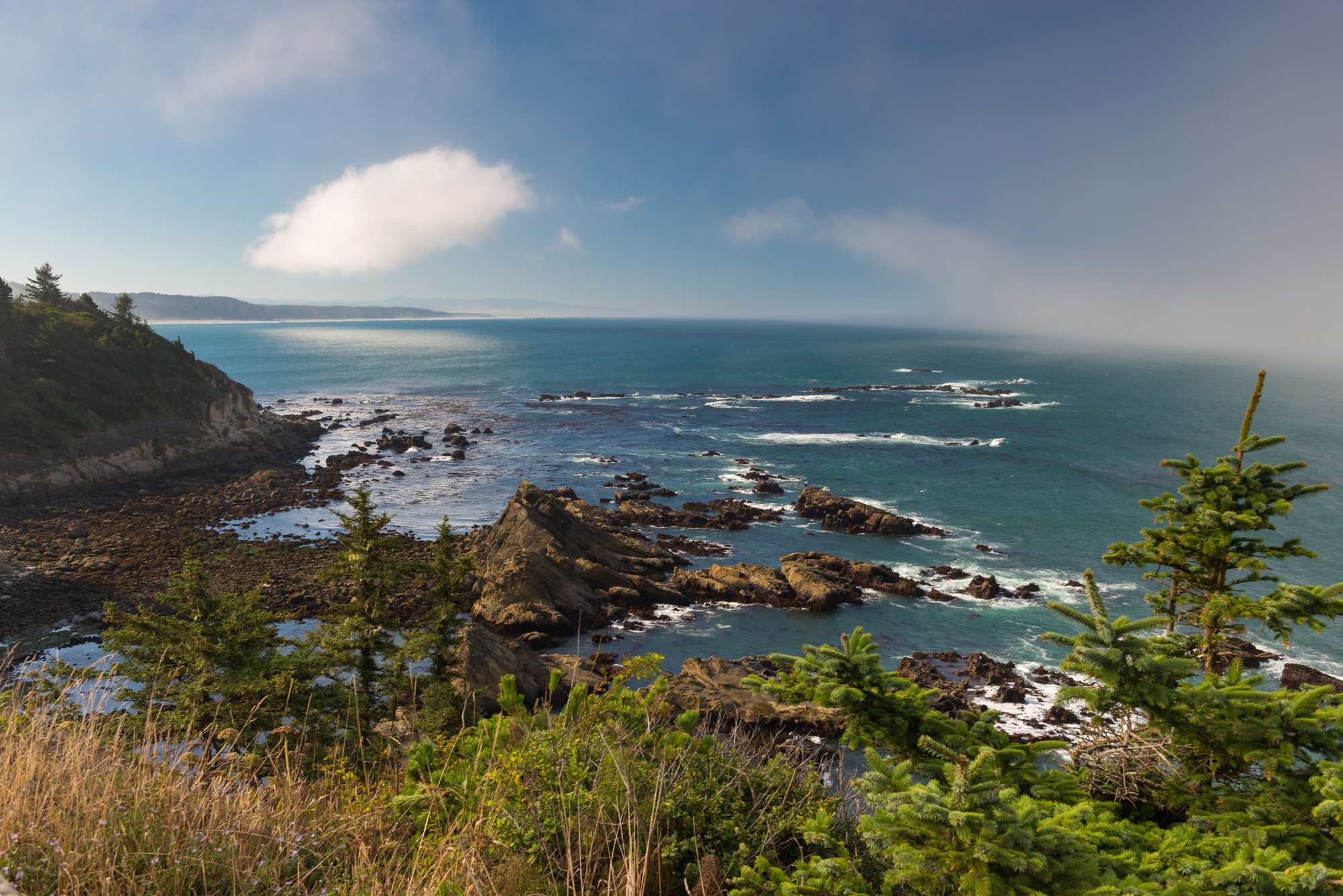

- Location within Oregon Location within the United States
- Interactive map of Cape Arago State Park
- Type: Public, state
- Location: Coos County, Oregon
- Nearest city: Coos Bay
- Coordinates: 43°18′22″N 124°23′36″W
- Operator: Oregon Parks and Recreation Department

Cape Arago State Park is a state park in the U.S. state of Oregon, administered by the Oregon Parks and Recreation Department. Cape Arago is north of Bandon and 15 miles southwest of Coos Bay on Cape Arago Highway in Coos County.

== History ==
In 1579, Sir Francis Drake is purported to have sought shelter for his ship, the Golden Hind, around Cape Arago. The headland was originally named Cape Gregory by James Cook on March 12, 1778 after Saint Gregory, the saint of that day; it was renamed Cape Arago after François Arago.

== See also ==
- Cape Arago Light
- Cape Arago Highway No. 240
- List of Oregon state parks
