= Lewis and Clark River Bridge =

- Viewed from the southeast in 2026
- Coordinates: 46.15229°N 123.85937°W
- Carries: US 101 Bus.
- Crosses: Lewis and Clark River
- Locale: near Astoria, Oregon
- Maintained by: Oregon DOT

Characteristics
- Design: Single-leaf bascule
- Total length: 828 feet (252 m)
- Longest span: 112 feet (34 m)

History
- Opened: 1925

Location
- Interactive map of Lewis and Clark River Bridge

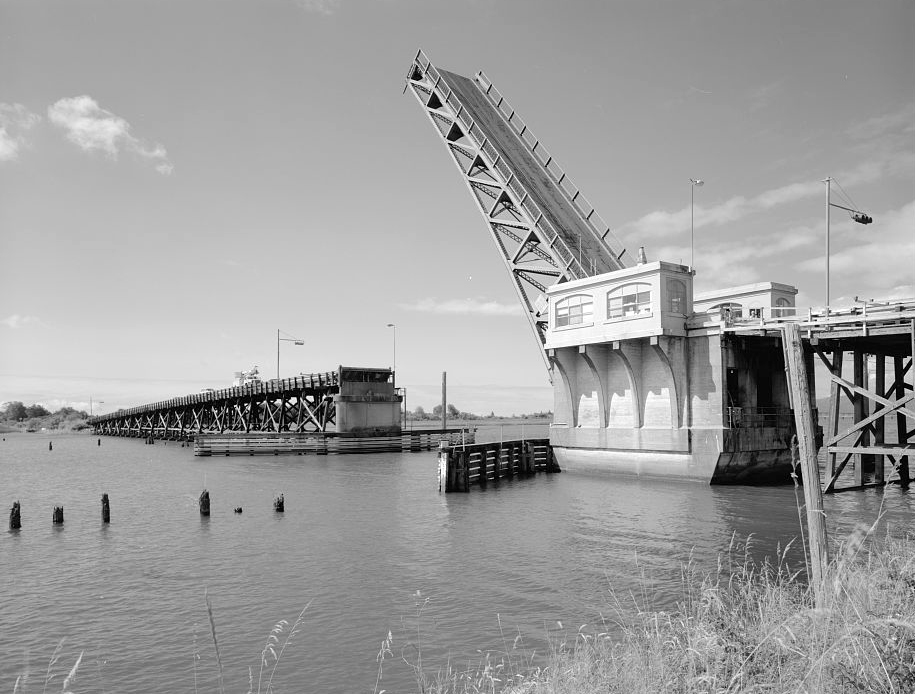
With the bascule leaf raised, 2001

The Lewis and Clark River Bridge is a bascule bridge that spans the Lewis and Clark River on U.S. Route 101 Business (a section originally part of U.S. Route 101) in Clatsop County, Oregon. It was designed by Conde McCullough and opened in 1925. It was built to replace an earlier bridge at the same location, a swing-span bridge constructed around 1910.

The total length of the bridge is 828 feet (252 m), and the length of the bascule main span is 112 ft (34 m). The approach spans consist of a total of 48 timber pile and stringer spans.

== See also ==
- List of bridges documented by the Historic American Engineering Record in Oregon

== Bibliography ==
- Hadlow, Robert W. (2001). Elegant Arches, Soaring Spans: C. B. McCullough, Oregon's Master Bridge Builder. Oregon State University Press. ISBN 0-87071-534-8.
