= Special routes of U.S. Route 101 =

Special routes of U.S. Route 101

Highway system
- United States Numbered Highway System; List; Special; Divided

A total of fifteen special routes of U.S. Route 101 exist.

Those business routes in California are assigned by the California Department of Transportation (Caltrans), but are not maintained by Caltrans unless they overlay other routes of the state highway system. Local authorities may request route assignment from the Caltrans Transportation System Information Program, and all requests require approval of the executive committee of the American Association of State Highway and Transportation Officials (AASHTO).

== California ==
=== Los Angeles alternate route ===
U.S. Route 101 Alternate
- Location: Los Angeles, CA
- Existed: Mid-1930s–1964

Present SR 1 in the Los Angeles area was U.S. Route 101 Alternate from the mid-1930s to 1964.

=== Los Angeles bypass route ===
U.S. Route 101 Bypass
- Location: Anaheim, CA–Los Angeles, CA
- Existed: Early-1940s–Mid-1950s

The precursor to the Santa Ana Freeway between Los Angeles and Anaheim was U.S. Route 101 Bypass from the early 1940s to the mid-1950s, when it became part of US 101. Old US 101 there is now partially SR 72.

=== Ventura business loop ===
U.S. Route 101 Business
- Location: Ventura, CA

US 101 Business in Ventura, California is a business loop that follows the former U.S. 101 alignment before the construction of the Ventura Freeway. The route runs along the entirety of Thompson Boulevard and portions of Main Street and Garden Street.

=== San Francisco bypass route ===
U.S. Route 101 Bypass
- Location: San Jose–San Francisco, California
- Existed: 1938–1964

The Bayshore Highway between San Jose and San Francisco was designated as part of US 101 in 1936, replacing El Camino Real (which became US 101 Alternate). At the urging of local businesses and groups, a proposal was submitted to AASHO to move US 101 back to El Camino Real, which was approved in 1938 alongside the creation of US 101 Bypass for the Bayshore Highway. Other proposals included signing El Camino Real as US 101 Scenic.

The Bayshore Freeway was constructed to replace the original highway between 1947 and 1962. US 101 was later rerouted onto the Bayshore Freeway during the 1964 renumbering and replaced US 101 Bypass entirely. Until then, US 101 used SR 82 (El Camino Real) and I-280.

=== Rio Dell business loop ===
U.S. Route 101 Business
- Location: Rio Dell, CA

US 101 Business, called Wildwood Avenue, is a business loop of US 101 through Rio Dell. Its southernmost section between US 101 near Scotia to the north end of the Eel River Bridge is legally defined as an unsigned California State Route 283.

=== Fortuna business loop ===
U.S. Route 101 Business
- Location: Fortuna, CA

US 101 Business, called Main Street and Fortuna Blvd in its entirety, is a business loop of US 101 through Fortuna.

=== McKinleyville business loop ===
U.S. Route 101 Business
- Location: McKinleyville, CA

US 101 Business, called Central Ave its entirety, is a business loop of US 101 through McKinleyville.

== Oregon ==
=== Astoria business loop ===
U.S. Highway 101 Business
- Location: Astoria, OR–Warrenton, OR
- Length: 7.40 mi (11.91 km)
- Existed: 1965–present

U.S. Route 101 Business is a business loop of US 101 that travels from Astoria to Warrenton. It is a former alignment of US 101, bypassed in 1964 when a new bridge opened across Youngs Bay; the business designation for the old route was approved by AASHO in 1965. The Oregon State Highway Commission originally requested the designation of U.S. Route 101 Alternate, which was rejected.

Major intersections

The entire route is in Clatsop County.

Location	mi	km	Destinations	Notes
Warrenton	1.27	2.04	US 101 – Astoria, Seaside	
Lewis and Clark River	4.67– 4.83	7.52– 7.77	Lewis and Clark River Bridge	
Youngs Bay	6.75– 7.08	10.86– 11.39	Old Youngs Bay Bridge	
Astoria	7.25 1.42	11.67 2.29	OR 202 east – Jewell, Vernonia	South end of OR 202 overlap
Astoria	0.18	0.29	US 101 to US 30 – Warrenton, Seaside, Astoria, Portland	North end of OR 202 overlap
1.000 mi = 1.609 km; 1.000 km = 0.621 mi: Concurrency terminus

== Washington ==
=== Ilwaco alternate route ===
U.S. Route 101 Alternate
- Location: Long Beach, WA
- Existed: 1931–present

U.S. Route 101 Alternate is an alternate route of U.S. Route 101 that bypasses the towns of Long Beach and Ilwaco in southwestern Washington.

== See also ==
- List of special routes of the United States Numbered Highway System
