= U.S. Route 101 =

U.S. Numbered Highway on the West Coast

U.S. Route 101
- US 101 highlighted in red

Route information
- Length: 1,535.24 mi (Note: Total length is calculated from route mileage within California (806.597 miles, 1,298.092 km), Oregon (363.11 miles, 584.37 km), and Washington (365.53 miles, 588.26 km).) (2,470.73 km)
- Existed: November 11, 1926–present

Major junctions
- South end: I-5 / I-10 in Los Angeles, California
- I-80 in San Francisco, California; US 199 near Crescent City, California; US 20 in Newport, Oregon; US 26 near Seaside, Oregon; US 30 in Astoria, Oregon; US 12 in Aberdeen, Washington
- North end: I-5 in Tumwater, Washington

Location
- Country: United States
- States: California, Oregon, Washington

Highway system
- United States Numbered Highway System; List; Special; Divided
← US 99	→ US 163

U.S. Route 101, or U.S. Highway 101 (US 101), is a major north–south highway that traverses the states of California, Oregon, and Washington on the West Coast of the United States. It is part of the United States Numbered Highway System and runs for over 1,500 miles (2,400 km) along the Pacific Ocean. The highway is also known by various names, including El Camino Real in parts of California, the Oregon Coast Highway, and the Olympic Highway in Washington. Despite its three-digit number, normally used for spur routes, US 101 is classified as a primary route with 10 as its "first digit".

The highway's southern terminus is at a major interchange with Interstate 5 (I-5) and I-10 in Los Angeles. US 101 follows several freeways in Southern California as it travels north of the Santa Monica Mountains and along the coast, where it is sometimes concurrent with California State Route 1 (SR 1). The highway travels inland from the coast and crosses the Salinas Valley as it approaches the San Francisco Bay Area. US 101 becomes the Bayshore Freeway as it traverses from San Jose to San Francisco, where it briefly becomes the Central Freeway and traverses city streets to reach the Golden Gate Bridge. US 101 continues north on the Redwood Highway and rejoins the coast before it enters Oregon.

The Oregon Coast Highway carries US 101 through the state's coastal towns and regions in the foothills of the Oregon Coast Range. The highway crosses over the Columbia River on the Astoria–Megler Bridge into Washington, where it follows Willapa Bay and an inland route to Aberdeen and Olympic National Park. US 101 travels north and east around the Olympic Peninsula and reaches its northernmost point in Port Angeles; from there, it travels east and later south to its northern terminus at I-5 in Tumwater, near Olympia. Several portions of the highway are also designated as scenic byways, including the Pacific Coast Scenic Byway in Washington; US 101 also serves three national parks: Pinnacles, Redwood, and Olympic.

The highway is a major north–south link along the Pacific coast north of San Francisco but does not serve the largest cities in Oregon and Washington; that role is instead filled by I-5 (formerly U.S. Route 99, U.S. Route 99E, and U.S. Route 99W), which has a more direct inland routing. US 101 was established in 1926 and followed several historic routes, including El Camino Real, which linked California's early Spanish missions, pueblos, and presidios. It originally terminated to the south in San Diego but was truncated to Los Angeles in 1964 after the construction of I-5. Other sections were later moved to freeway alignments that bypassed cities. Several sections of US 101 in Washington and Oregon were rebuilt in the mid-20th century to eliminate curves and address traffic congestion. Later projects expanded the Bayshore Freeway in the San Francisco Bay Area and relocated sections of the highway in Oregon in response to landslides and erosion.

== Route description ==
Lengths
	mi	km
CA	806.60	1,298.10
OR	363.11	584.37
WA	365.53	588.26
Total	1,535.24	2,470.73

US 101 is a major highway that generally follows the Pacific Ocean through the West Coast states of California, Oregon, and Washington. It spans over 1,500 miles (2,400 km) from its southern terminus in Los Angeles to its northern terminus near Olympia, Washington. US 101 generally runs parallel to I-5, which serves most of the West Coast's largest cities and is designated for long-haul freight. The corridor is also designated as part of U.S. Bicycle Route 95 (USBR 95) in Northern California and is proposed to be part of USBR 40 and USBR 97 in Washington.

The highway is known by several names that vary between the states. In California, portions of US 101 are part of the Santa Ana Freeway, Hollywood Freeway, Ventura Freeway, Bayshore Freeway, and Redwood Highway. In Oregon, it is officially the Oregon Coast Highway No. 9 under the named highways system and part of the Pacific Coast Scenic Byway, a National Scenic Byway. In Washington, it is officially part of the Pacific Coast Scenic Byway, a state scenic highway. In Southern California, US 101 is commonly called "the 101" (pronounced "the one oh one").

=== California ===
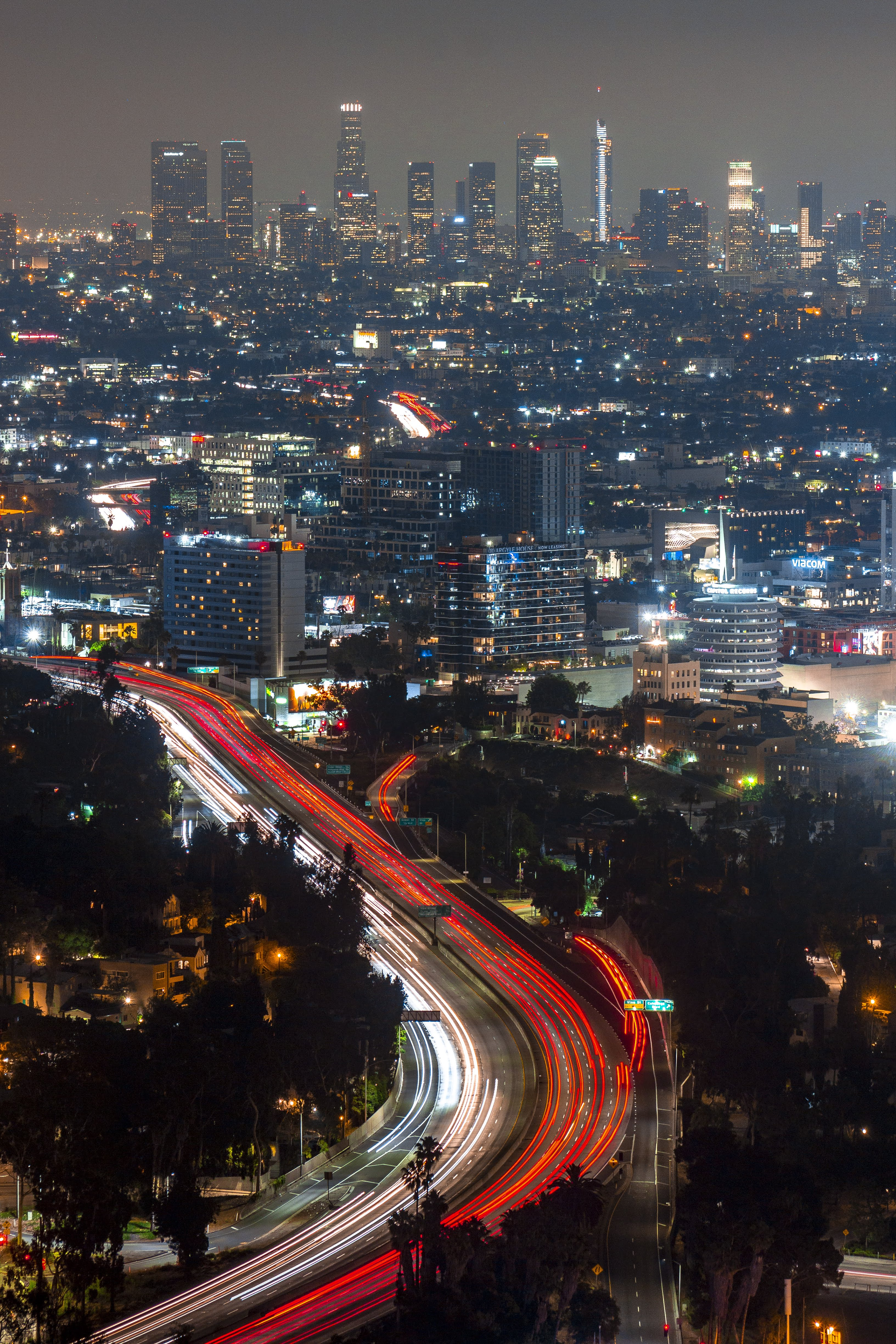
US 101 on the Hollywood Freeway with Downtown Los Angeles in the background

US 101 travels on several major freeways in the Greater Los Angeles area, including some of the most congested roads in the United States. Its southern terminus is in Boyle Heights at the 135-acre (55 ha) East Los Angeles Interchange, one of the busiest freeway junctions in the United States, where US 101 meets I-5, I-10, and SR 60. The highway travels north on a section of the Santa Ana Freeway and turns west to cross the Los Angeles River after merging with the San Bernardino Freeway. The Santa Ana Freeway continues across Downtown Los Angeles and passes Union Station, a major transit hub, and government buildings before it reaches a junction with SR 110. Beyond Downtown Los Angeles, US 101 uses the Hollywood Freeway as it travels northwest through the eponymous neighborhood towards Cahuenga Pass, where it crosses the Hollywood Hills and passes Universal Studios Hollywood. The highway leaves the Hollywood Freeway to turn west onto the Ventura Freeway, which travels along the southern edge of the suburban San Fernando Valley and intersects I-405. US 101 continues into Ventura County, where it joins SR 1 and serves communities in the Conejo Valley and Oxnard Plain.

The highway follows the Pacific Ocean northwest from Ventura through Santa Barbara, where it separates the downtown from its beach, and Goleta. US 101 becomes a divided highway beyond Goleta as it turns north at Gaviota State Park to cross the Santa Ynez Mountains at Gaviota Pass; SR 1 splits to remain closer to the coastline, as it does in several areas of the state. The highway continues inland and travels around the Purisima Hills to reach Santa Maria, where the freeway resumes as it bypasses the city. US 101 briefly returns to the coastline near Pismo Beach and turns inland over the Irish Hills towards San Luis Obispo alongside SR 1. The highway crosses the Santa Lucia Range through Cuesta Pass and follows the Salinas River northwest through Atascadero and the wine-growing region surrounding Paso Robles. US 101 passes near Pinnacles National Park and travels through the city of Salinas, where it turns northeast to cross the Gabilan Range. From there, the highway descends into the Santa Clara Valley and Gilroy, the southernmost city in the San Francisco Bay Area.

US 101 continues northwest into San Jose on the South Valley Freeway and later the Bayshore Freeway, which travels around the east and north sides of downtown San Jose. The ten-lane freeway generally follows the west side of San Francisco Bay as it traverses several Silicon Valley communities, including Palo Alto, Redwood City, and San Mateo, and passes offices for high-tech companies. It parallels I-280, which travels along the foothills of the Santa Cruz Mountains to the west, as the two continue up the San Francisco Peninsula. US 101 passes San Francisco International Airport and briefly turns northeast to rejoin the coastline before it enters the city of San Francisco near Candlestick Point. The Bayshore Freeway intersects I-280 and terminates at an interchange with I-80 near the SoMa neighborhood in the city center. US 101 then uses city streets to continue through San Francisco; it travels north on Van Ness Avenue, a wide boulevard with bus lanes, and west on Lombard Street to the Presidio of San Francisco, a historic landmark and city park.

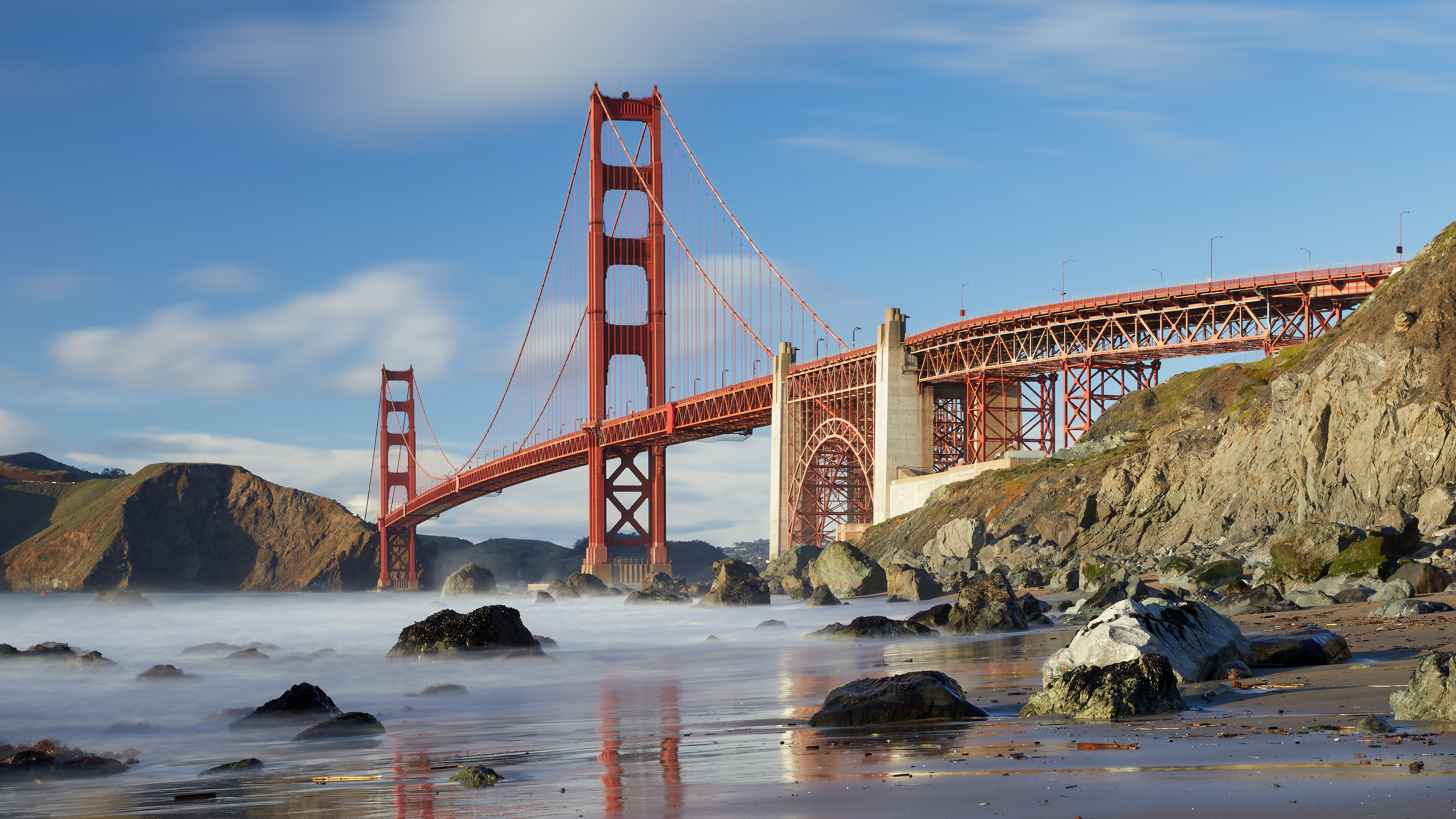
The Golden Gate Bridge connects sections of US 101 between San Francisco and Marin County.

The divided highway travels through the north side of the Presidio and tunnels under a portion of the park as it approaches the Golden Gate Bridge, a tolled suspension bridge across the Golden Gate at the entrance to San Francisco Bay. It is operated by the Golden Gate Bridge, Highway and Transportation District and is not legally defined as part of US 101 and SR 1. The orange-colored bridge, considered an icon of the city, has six lanes with a movable barrier and walkways on both sides for pedestrians and cyclists. North of the bridge, US 101 is designated as the Redwood Highway. It splits from SR 1 and continues as an eight-lane freeway through suburban communities in Marin County, including an elevated viaduct in downtown San Rafael. The highway continues along the west side of San Pablo Bay into Sonoma County, where it turns northwest to head inland through Petaluma and Santa Rosa in the North Bay's Wine Country. US 101 follows the Russian River upstream through wineries and vineyards into Mendocino County as the freeway narrows to four lanes and eventually ends.

Beyond the San Francisco Bay Area, US 101 is primarily an undivided highway with some short freeway sections and serves as the primary route in the rugged North Coast region. It traverses the Mendocino Range and reaches the northern terminus of SR 1 at Leggett. The Redwood Highway then follows the South Fork Eel River north into Humboldt Redwoods State Park, where it runs parallel to the Avenue of the Giants. US 101 continues northwest along the Eel River to reach the coastline near Eureka, which it travels through on city streets before becoming a divided highway around Humboldt Bay. The highway travels north along the coast through the Redwood National and State Parks, where it passes through old-growth coast redwood forests, and reaches Crescent City. US 101 intersects US 199 north of the city and continues northwest along the coast to the Oregon state line.

=== Oregon ===
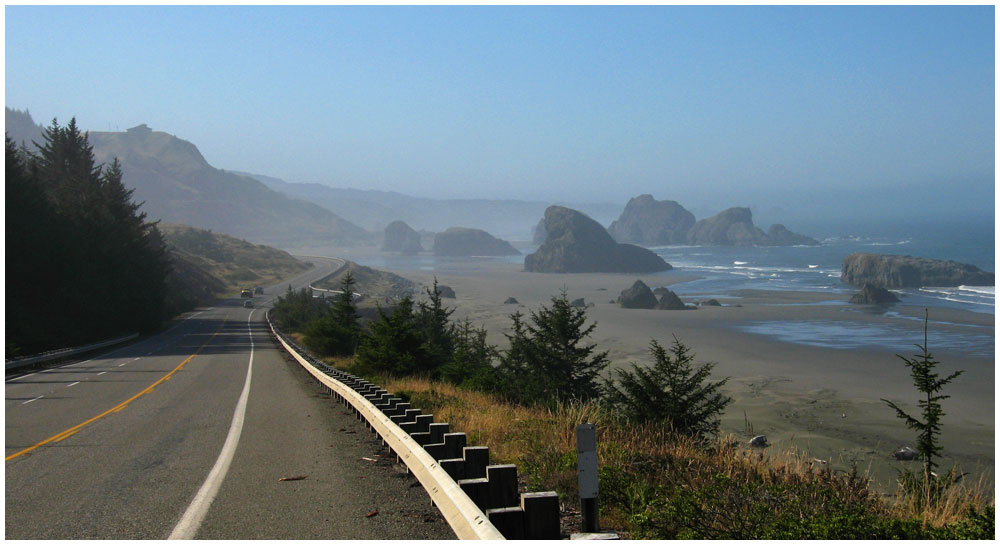
A coastline section of US 101 near Cape Sebastian

The Oregon Coast Highway begins at the California state line near Brookings and carries US 101 north along the Pacific coast. It is generally a two-lane highway that passes through small towns and near 77 state parks on the rugged coastline, as well as some inland areas. From Brookings, US 101 traverses the 12-mile (19 km) Samuel H. Boardman State Scenic Corridor, which includes roadside viewpoints and trailheads that face the ocean. The highway remains elevated from the coastline and briefly descends to sea level near the Pistol River State Scenic Viewpoint before climbing Cape Sebastian on its way to Gold Beach. US 101 travels through Gold Beach and crosses the Rogue River to continue north along the coast. The highway turns west to follow the base of Humbug Mountain, a 1,761-foot (537 m) mountain that rises from the Pacific Ocean, and northwest to reach Port Orford, where it leaves the coastline.

US 101 continues north, separated from the coastline by prairies and marshes, to Bandon; there, it briefly turns east and crosses the Coquille River to traverse more marshes. The highway travels further inland to the northeast and follows a slough off Coos Bay to the neighboring cities of Coos Bay and North Bend, where it splits into a pair of one-way streets. US 101 leaves North Bend and crosses Coos Bay on the Conde McCullough Memorial Bridge; from there, it heads north along the edge of a 40-mile (64 km) exposed coastal sand dune that forms the Oregon Dunes National Recreation Area, along with freshwater lakes to the east. US 101 diverts northeast to cross the Umpqua River at Reedsport and passes through a meandering section near Tahkenitch Lake before it returns to the coastal dunes around Dunes City.

The Oregon Coast Highway crosses the Siuslaw River into Florence and intersects Oregon Route 126 (OR 126), a major east–west route that traverses the Coast Range to Eugene. US 101 returns to the coastline near the Heceta Head Lighthouse and continues north along several high cliffs around Cape Perpetua and Yachats that overlook the beaches. The Oregon Coast Highway then crosses the Yaquina Bay Bridge into Newport and serves as the western terminus of US 20, a transcontinental route to Boston and the longest highway in the United States. US 101 continues along the coastline and Siletz Bay into Lincoln City, where it serves as the city's main street for 7 miles (11 km) and turns away from the coast to bypass the Cascade Head biosphere reserve. The highway briefly returns to the coastline before beginning a long inland stretch that follows the Nestucca River and other streams to Tillamook.

US 101 passes the Tillamook County Creamery Association factory and travels northwest along Tillamook Bay to rejoin the coast near Garibaldi, but later turns inland to skirt Nehalem Bay and avoid Cape Falcon. The highway travels around the community of Cannon Beach, home to the landmark Haystack Rock, and turns northeast to bypass Tillamook Head and intersect US 26—a major route to Portland. US 101 continues north along the Necanicum River to reach the coast at Seaside and travel through the city and nearby beach communities. The highway turns northeast and crosses Youngs Bay from Warrenton to Astoria, where it meets the western terminus of US 30; that highway continues into downtown Astoria and east towards Portland. US 101 turns south onto a loop ramp that leads north to the Astoria–Megler Bridge, a 4-mile-long (6.4 km) bridge that spans the mouth of the Columbia River and carries the highway into Washington.

=== Washington ===
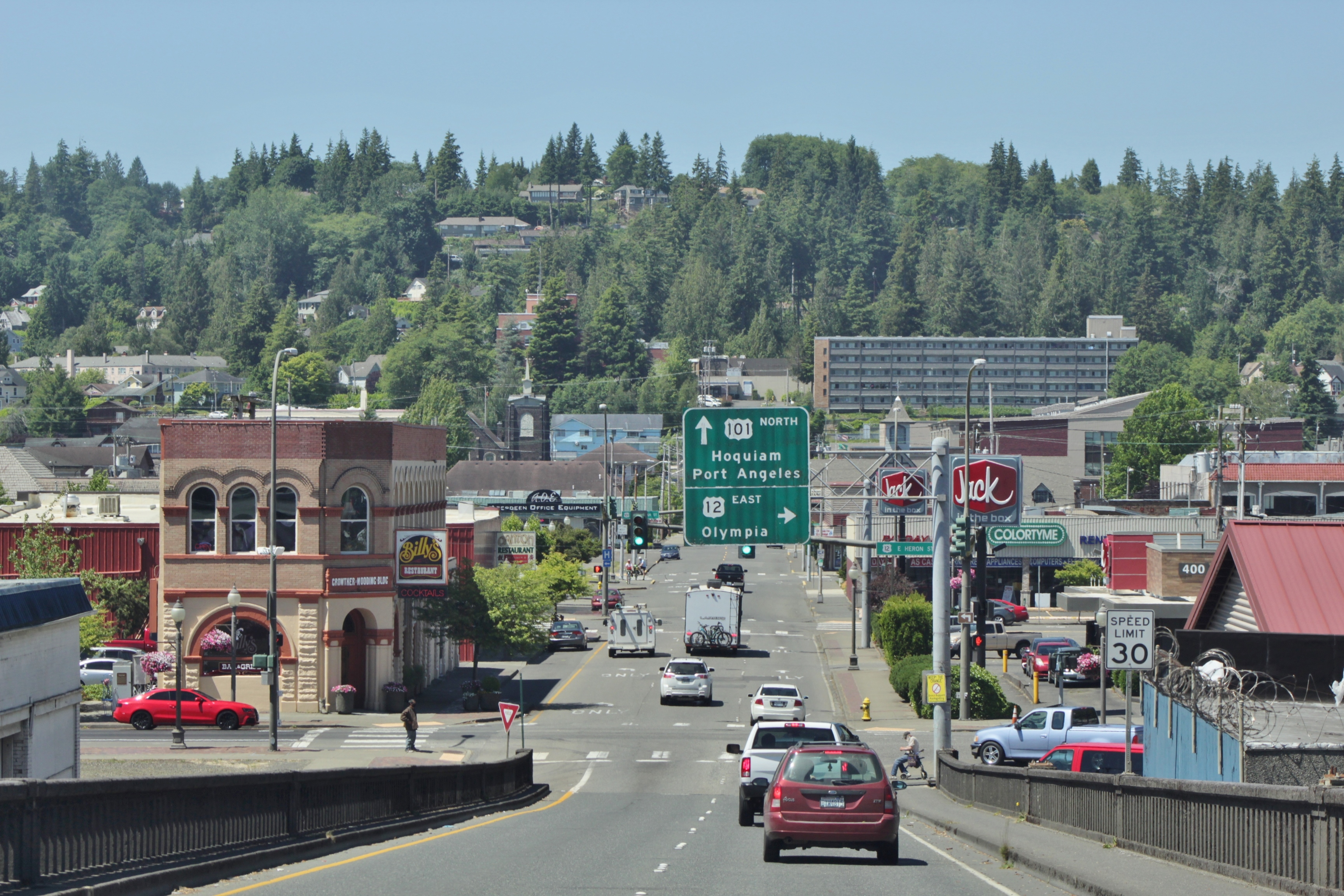
Northbound view of US 101 as it descends into downtown Aberdeen, Washington, to intersect US 12

US 101 enters Washington state at the north end of the Astoria–Megler Bridge and immediately turns west to follow the Columbia River. The highway traverses Fort Columbia State Park in a tunnel and passes through Chinook on the north side of the river's mouth towards Ilwaco, near Cape Disappointment. From Ilwaco, US 101 briefly travels north before turning east at Seaview, the southernmost city on the Long Beach Peninsula, and following Willapa Bay to a junction with State Route 4 (SR 4) on the Naselle River. The highway continues along the east side of the bay through South Bend to Raymond, where it travels inland to cross the forested Willapa Hills to reach Aberdeen. US 101 enters the city by crossing the Chehalis River and turns west onto a pair of one-way streets after an intersection with US 12.

The streets travel through western Aberdeen and neighboring Hoquiam, where the highway is split by the Hoquiam River, and rejoin north of downtown. The highway continues north along inland streams into the Quinault Indian Reservation, which it enters near Lake Quinault at the edge of Olympic National Park. US 101 circumnavigates the Olympic Peninsula and provides the main access to the national park and various sites via spur roads; there are no roads that cross the Olympic Mountains, which separate areas of the national park and adjacent Olympic National Forest. The highway turns west from Lake Quinault to reach the Pacific coastline, which it follows for 15 miles (24 km) between Queets and Ruby Beach within Olympic National Park. US 101 then heads northeast to follow the Hoh River upstream and intersects the main access road to the Hoh Rainforest. It then travels north through Forks and follows the Sol Duc River east to re-enter the national park.

Aerial view of US 101 near the Elwha River west of Port Angeles, Washington

US 101 travels along the southern shore of Lake Crescent, one of the deepest lakes in the state, and the foothills of the Olympic Mountains until it crosses the Elwha River near the site of the demolished Elwha Dam. The highway enters Port Angeles and uses city streets to reach the northernmost point of US 101, near the ferry terminal for the Black Ball Line to Victoria, British Columbia. The four-lane highway turns east to follow the Strait of Juan de Fuca through a rural prairie and becomes a super two expressway as it bypasses Sequim. US 101 travels around Sequim Bay and turns south to follow Discovery Bay to a junction with SR 20, which serves Port Townsend and the North Cascades.

The highway travels south and crosses a pass in the Olympic Mountains near Mount Walker before it reaches the west shore of Hood Canal, which it follows for more than 50 miles (80 km). US 101 passes several state parks and additional access points for the national park, including Lake Cushman near Hoodsport. It leaves Hood Canal on the Skokomish Indian Reservation and continues south on a super two bypass around Shelton, where it intersects SR 3. US 101 then becomes a freeway and cuts across several inlets and bays of Puget Sound as it turns southeast towards the Olympia area. The freeway merges with SR 8 and continues southeast to reach its northern terminus at I-5 in Tumwater, near the Washington State Capitol campus in nearby Olympia.

The section between Lake Crescent and Sequim is generally signed east–west, while the section south of the intersection with SR 20 is signed north–south but turned 180 degrees. The direct route between Aberdeen and Olympia uses US 12 and SR 8, which complete the Olympic Loop Highway.

== Numbering ==
According to the American Association of State Highway and Transportation Officials' (AASHTO) numbering scheme for the United States Numbered Highway System, three-digit route numbers are generally subsidiaries of two-digit primary routes. Of these two-digit routes, the principal north–south routes were assigned numbers ending in 1. US 101 is an exception to the three-digit rule due to its role as the westernmost major route; it is treated as a primary, two-digit route with a "first digit" of 10, rather than a spur of US 1, which is located along the east coast.

== History ==
=== Establishment and early development ===
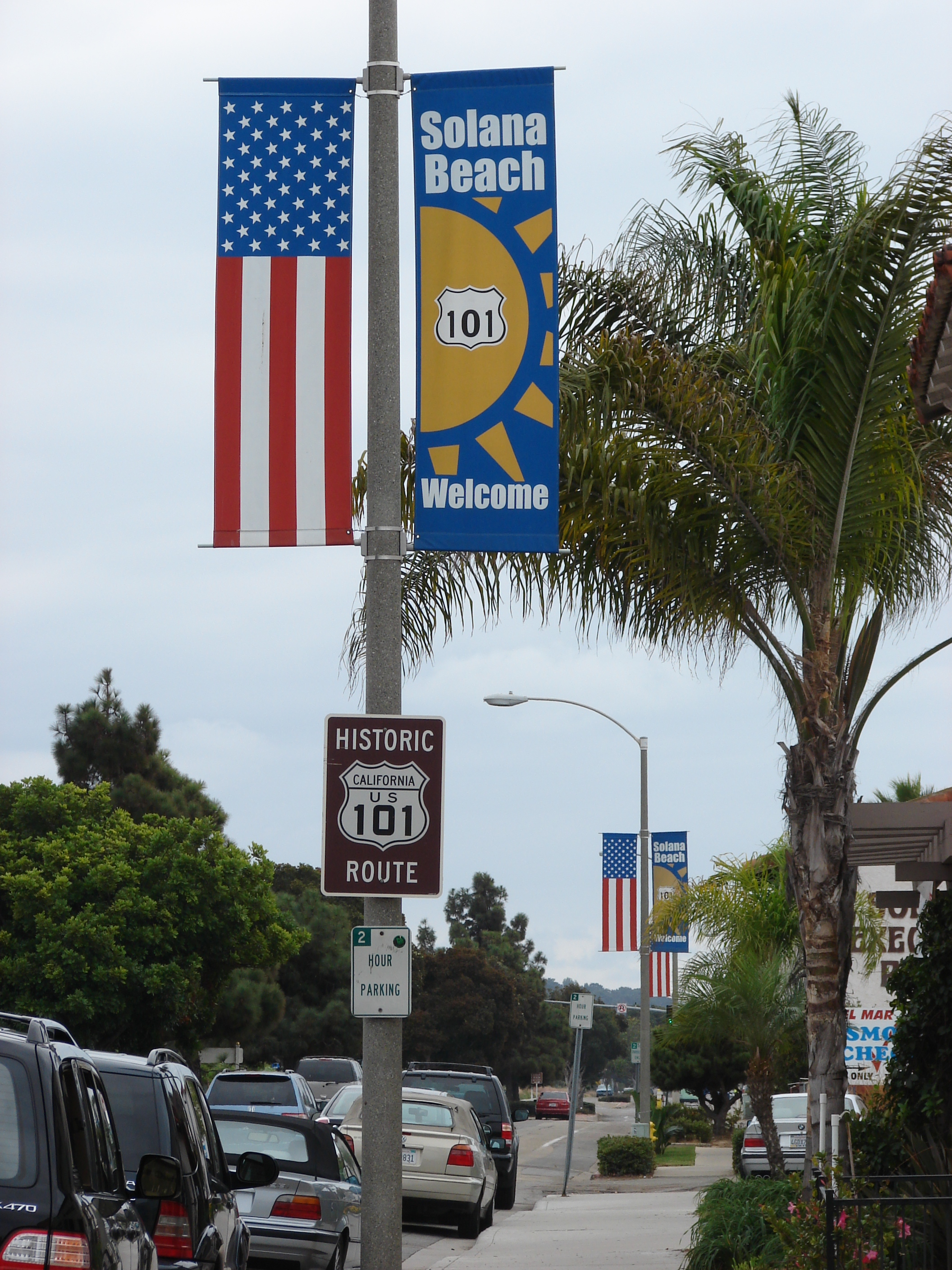
Historic Route 101 in Solana Beach, California

US 101 was established as part of the initial United States Numbered Highway System that was developed by the American Association of State Highway Officials (AASHO) in the 1920s. The preliminary plan recommended in 1925 had the highway terminate at San Diego in the south and in Port Angeles, Washington, to the north. The final plan extended US 101 within Washington around the east side of the Olympic Peninsula to Olympia and was adopted by the AASHO on November 11, 1926. The first section of US 101 to be signed in California was between San Diego and Los Angeles in January 1928, which was followed by the rest of the route later in the year.

Portions of the coastal highway had already been constructed by the respective state governments and also followed foot and wagon routes developed in earlier centuries. Among these was El Camino Real in California, which was formed by the Portolá expedition in 1769 and 1770 and connected the historic Spanish missions, pueblos, and presidios. The California state government chose a section of El Camino Real in San Bruno in 1912 to become the first paved highway in the state. The San Diego–San Francisco section of El Camino Real was incorporated into the multi-state Pacific Highway in the 1910s; other sections of US 101 in California used the existing Redwood Highway, which was constructed from 1917 to 1923, and Coast Highway.

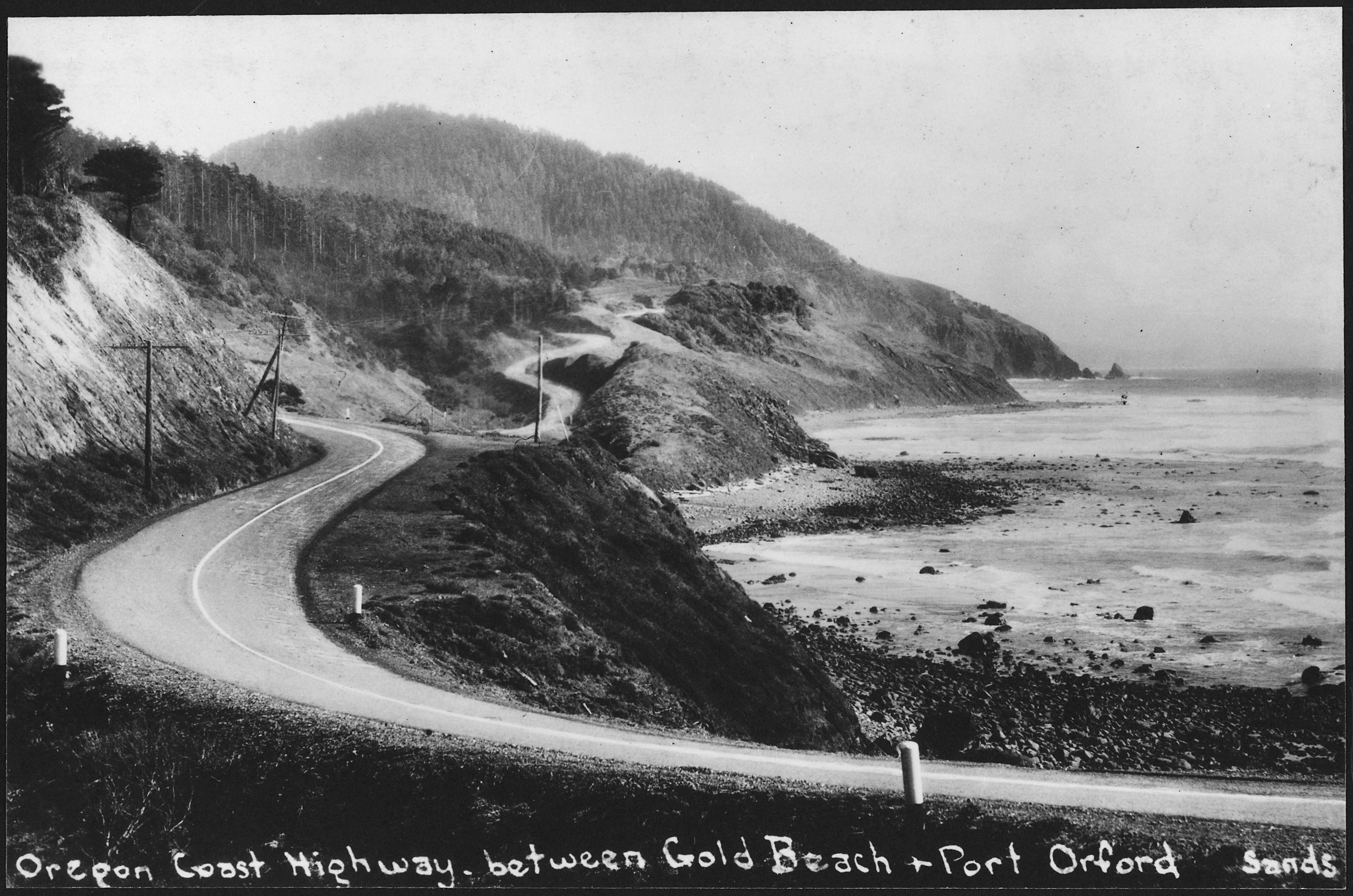
A section of the Oregon Coast Highway near Humbug Mountain, photographed in 1938

Construction of the Oregon Coast Highway began in 1921, two years after a state referendum that voted in favor of funding the development of highways with a one-cent gas tax. At the time, several short wagon roads and plank roads connected settlements on the coast, and overland travel primarily used beaches. The highway was gradually constructed and paved in the 1920s, but a set of six ferry crossings remained. These ferries were operated by private companies until the state government acquired them in 1927 with plans to replace them with bridges. The five major Oregon bridges on US 101 were designed by state engineer Conde B. McCullough and opened by 1936 using funding from the federal government's New Deal programs. As automobile traffic on the Oregon Coast increased, other sections were realigned to avoid rugged terrain or bypassed with tunnels. The Oregon Coast Highway was declared complete on October 3, 1936, and cost $25 million to construct (equivalent to $455 million in 2025 dollars).

Washington completed the final sections of the Olympic Loop Highway between 1927 and 1931 for $11 million (equivalent to $187 million in 2025 dollars). The project paved several existing sections of the state roads and also constructed 7 miles (11 km) of new highway from the Queets River to Ruby Beach near Kalaloch. Portions of US 101 passed through lands that were later incorporated into Olympic National Park when it was established in 1938; under the National Park Service, sections of the Crescent Lake Highway were widened and improved in 1949. The Washington State Highway Commission submitted an application to AASHO in 1955 to extend US 101 northeast from Discovery Bay to Whidbey Island and Mount Vernon, where it would terminate at US 99. The proposal was rejected by AASHO for being too long of a detour and including a tolled ferry crossing.

=== New alignments and freeways ===
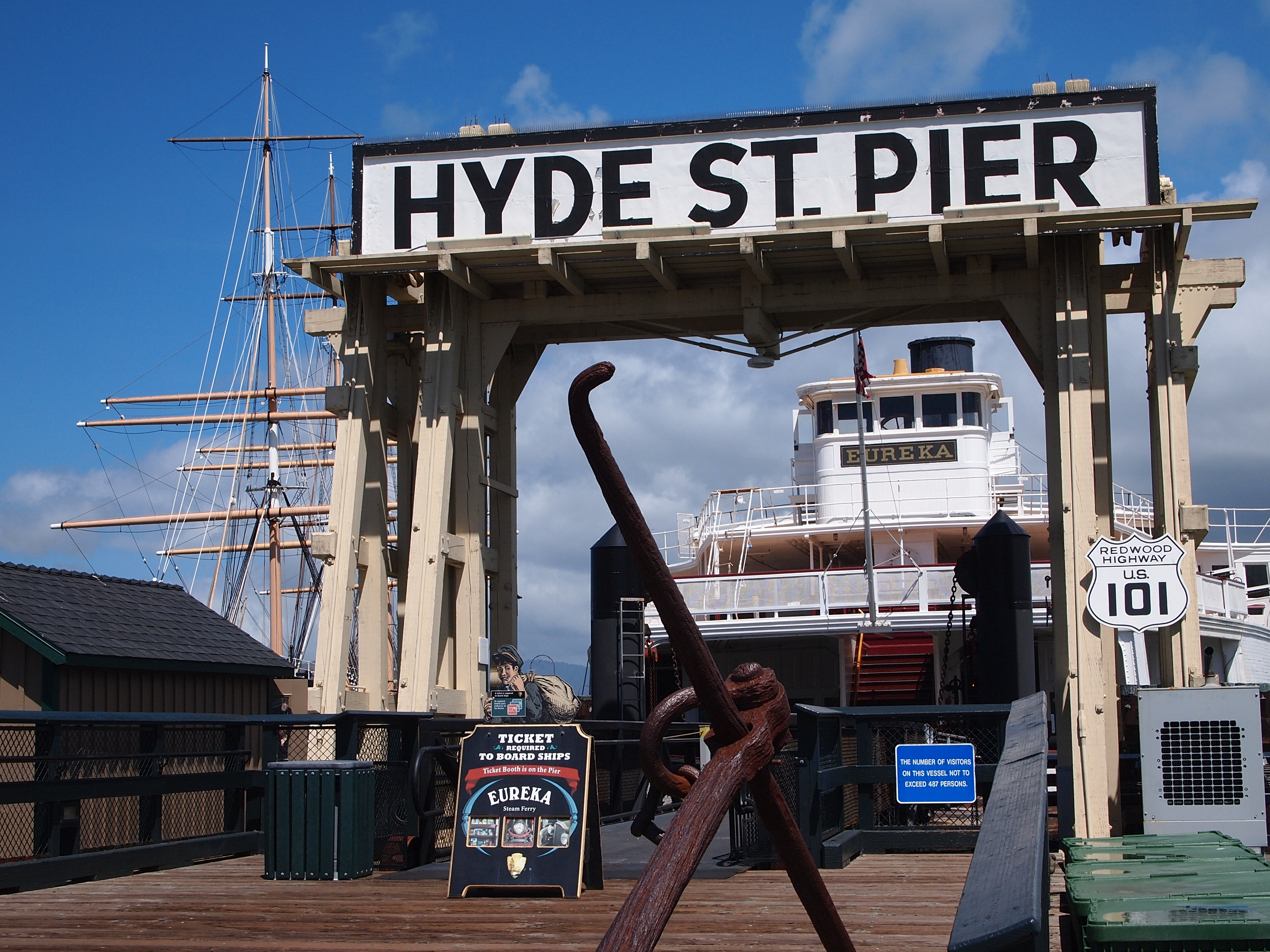
Hyde Street Pier in San Francisco, part of the pre–Golden Gate Bridge alignment of US 101

US 101 was split into two routes in the San Francisco Bay Area between San Jose and San Francisco in 1929: US 101W followed El Camino Real on the San Francisco Peninsula for 50 miles (80 km); US 101E traversed the East Bay for 54 miles (87 km) to Oakland, where it turned west on a cross-bay ferry to San Francisco. The branches converged in Downtown San Francisco and traveled along city streets to the Hyde Street Pier, where the highway continued on automobile ferries to Sausalito at the south end of the Redwood Highway. By 1936, US 101E had been eliminated in favor of the route on the west side, which was re-designated as US 101.

The Hyde Street–Sausalito ferry was removed from US 101 following the May 1937 completion of the Golden Gate Bridge, which would carry the highway from San Francisco to Marin County. It was the longest suspension bridge in the world at the time of its construction and was funded by a $35 million regional bond (equivalent to $615 million in 2025 dollars) that was paid off in 1971. The San Jose–San Francisco section of US 101 was initially moved from El Camino Real to the Bayshore Highway, a four-lane undivided highway that was constructed between 1924 and 1937 to bypass several towns on the peninsula. El Camino Real was re-designated as US 101 Alternate in 1936, which sparked outcry from businesses and groups who lobbied for a reversal of the change that was submitted by state officials to AASHO. In 1938, US 101 was moved back to El Camino Real and the Bayshore Highway was designated as US 101 Bypass.

In the late 1940s, the California state government announced plans to convert most of US 101 between Los Angeles and San Francisco to freeways using funds from the Collier–Burns Highway Act of 1947. Prior to the act, the Cahuenga Pass Freeway had opened in June 1940 between Hollywood and the San Fernando Valley in Los Angeles to replace a narrow, winding mountain road. It was the city's second freeway and was later extended southeast towards Downtown and renamed the Hollywood Freeway when it was completed on April 16, 1954. Several other early freeway segments were signed as US 101 Bypass or US 101 Alternate. In San Luis Obispo, a freeway around the northwest side of downtown was completed by the early 1960s, alongside bypasses of nearby rural towns. The San Diego–San Francisco section of US 101 was designated as El Camino Real by the California state government in 1959 as part of a program to add historic markers on the highway.

The Santa Ana Freeway was planned as a Los Angeles–Irvine connector in the late 1930s and constructed in phases, beginning with a section near Downtown Los Angeles that opened in December 1947. US 101 was later moved onto sections of the freeway, which was completed in 1958 and served as a continuation of the Hollywood Freeway. By the time it was completed, sections of the freeway between Anaheim and Los Angeles were carrying over 113,000 vehicles per day and were planned to be widened to six lanes within a few years. The south end of the Santa Ana Freeway merged into the San Diego Freeway, which began construction in 1954 and was completed in 1968. Both freeways were incorporated into plans for the new Interstate Highway System in 1955 and assigned to I-5 three years later.

US 101 was truncated to Los Angeles during a 1963 AASHO meeting at the request of the California state government, as I-5 had replaced the stretch to San Diego; the changes were made ahead of a major restructuring of the state's highway system that took effect on July 1, 1964. The old sections of the highway from San Diego to Los Angeles were given local names and later signed as Historic US 101 in the late 2010s by local governments. The 1963 action also moved the San Jose–San Francisco section onto the Bayshore Freeway, which was built to replace the Bayshore Highway on US 101 Bypass. The freeway had been proposed to address congestion and frequent collisions on the highway, nicknamed "Bloody Bayshore", and opened in stages between 1947 and 1962. The bypassed sections of El Camino Real were renumbered to SR 82 in the Bay Area and signed as business routes of US 101 in other cities. From the north end of the Bayshore Freeway at I-80 in San Francisco, US 101 was routed west along a section of the Central Freeway, which opened in 1955 and was extended four years later to Van Ness Avenue. Plans to extend the Central Freeway and other thoroughfares through San Francisco to the Golden Gate Bridge were later cancelled by the mid-1960s following widespread opposition and protests from city residents.

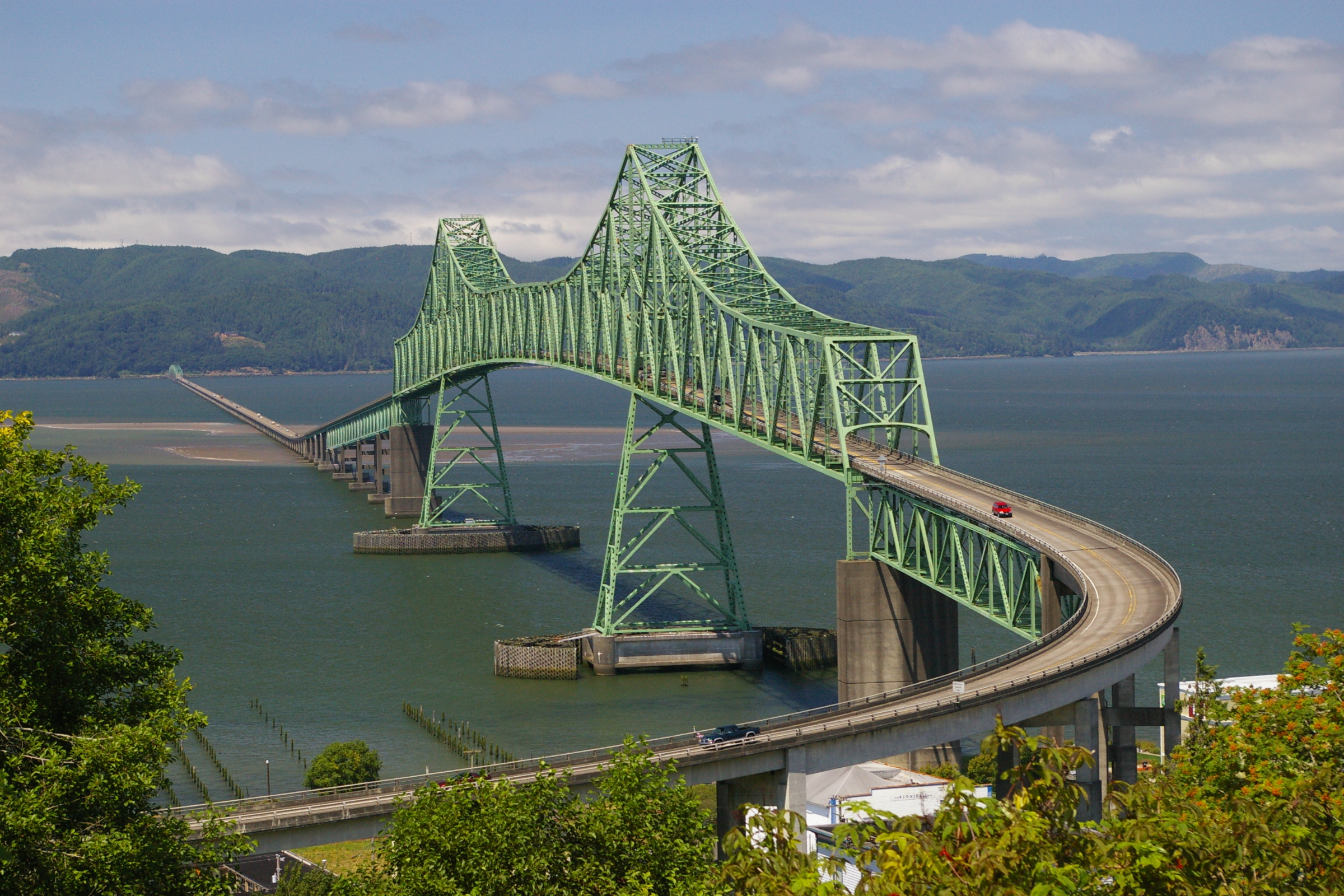
The Astoria–Megler Bridge, opened in 1966, carries US 101 over the Columbia River north of Astoria, Oregon.

Several sections of the Oregon Coast Highway were rebuilt in the 1950s and 1960s to eliminate curves and move the highway further from the coastline in cities such as Cannon Beach. A 53-mile (85 km) realignment from Brookings to Gold Beach and a more direct route from Bandon to Coos Bay to bypass Coquille were completed as part of this program in the early 1960s. In 1955, Oregon congressman A. Walter Norblad unsuccessfully proposed that the US 101 corridor be included in the Interstate Highway System to allow for federal funds to construct a bridge across the Columbia River; the proposal was also endorsed by a U.S. Army official, who also sought a similar designation for the Washington section. The Seaside–Astoria section was straightened and realigned onto a new bridge over Youngs Bay in 1964. The Astoria–Megler Bridge over the Columbia River opened to traffic on July 29, 1966, replacing a ferry and comprising the final "link" in US 101. The northern terminus of US 101 was originally at Capitol Way (US 99) in downtown Olympia until it was moved to a freeway bypass in December 1958. The freeway section was extended northwest from Olympia to Shelton in 1965.

=== Modern projects ===
The final traffic signal on the 435-mile (700 km) section of US 101 between Los Angeles and San Francisco, located at Anacapa Street in Santa Barbara, was removed in November 1991. The removal was spurred by the construction of a freeway through Santa Barbara, which was completed the following year and bypassed four signalized intersections. The Central Freeway's northernmost leg in San Francisco sustained damage in the 1989 Loma Prieta earthquake, which required the upper deck to be removed in 1997. The section north of Mission Boulevard was demolished in 2003 and partially replaced by Octavia Boulevard, which opened in 2005, while US 101 was rerouted onto Van Ness Avenue further east. From 2016 to 2022, Van Ness Avenue was rebuilt by the San Francisco Municipal Railway to add center bus lanes and landscaped medians as part of the Van Ness Bus Rapid Transit project.

Several existing freeway sections in California were expanded to add high-occupancy vehicle lanes (HOV lanes) beginning in the 1980s to address increased congestion, especially in the San Francisco Bay Area. By 1984, a section in Marin County had been opened to traffic; it was followed by sections in San Mateo and Santa Clara counties that were funded by a sales tax approved in a 1984 ballot measure. The HOV lanes were extended south through San Jose to Bernal Road in 1990. A 16-mile (26 km) section of the existing HOV lanes from Redwood City to San Bruno was converted to high-occupancy toll lanes in 2023 with the use of electronic toll collection.

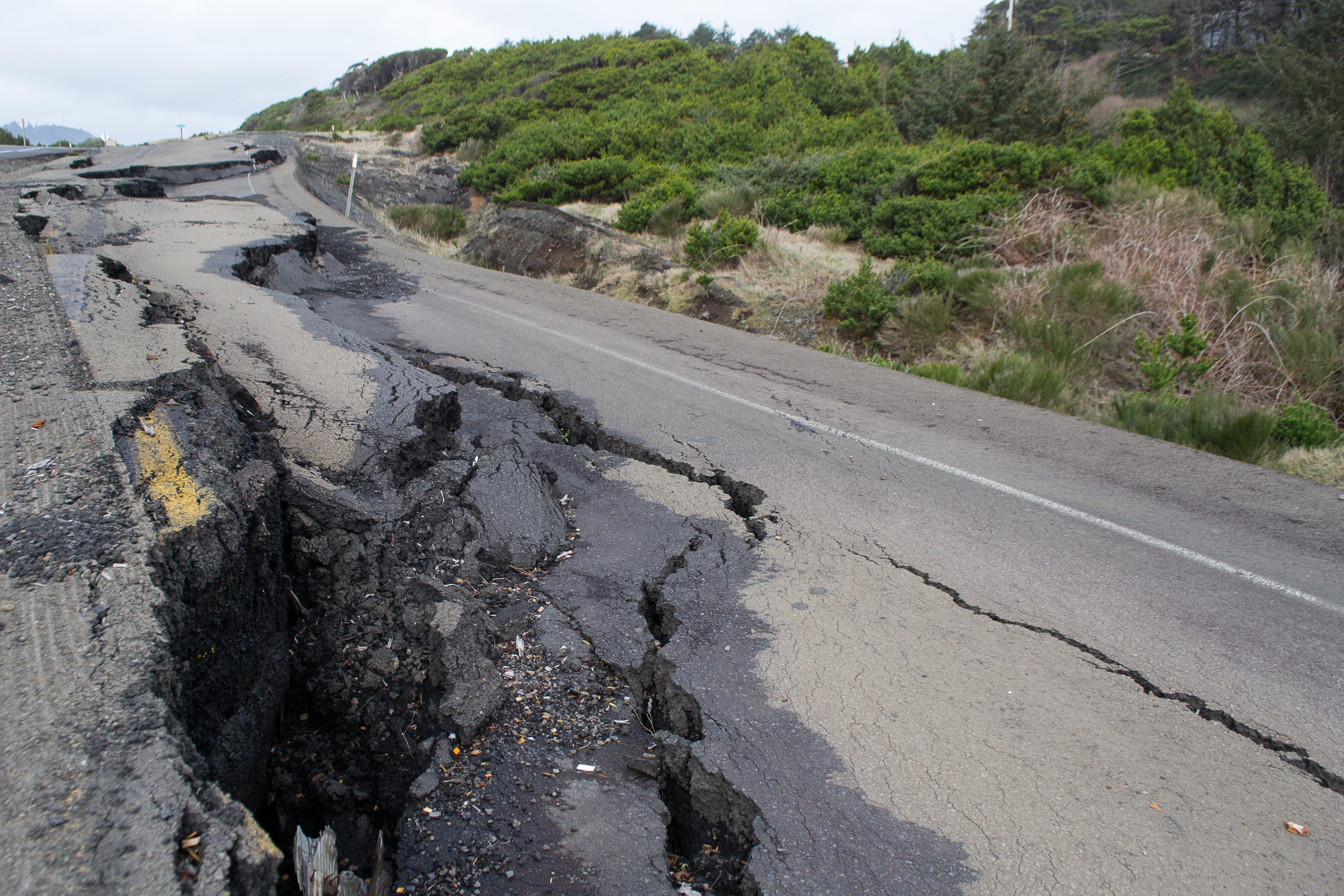
A washed-out section of US 101 near Newport, Oregon, in 2013

Sections of US 101 in Oregon have been rebuilt or relocated due to erosion or landslides that caused considerable damage to the highway. The use of riprap to reinforce new sections of the roadway was banned by the Oregon Department of Land Conservation and Development in 1977 due to its effect on beach degradation. An effort to repeal the ban and rebuild sections of US 101 began in 2002 and resulted in an amendment in 2022. Several sections of US 101 between Newport and Lincoln City are identified as persistent sunken grade and rockfall areas in need of frequent repairs. Other portions of the highway in southwestern Oregon had landslide and subsidence issues, including a section in Harbor that was closed for several weeks in early 2016 by an 80-foot (24 m) sinkhole.

Severe erosion of the highway along the Hoh River in Washington was addressed through the construction of eight engineered logjams by the Washington State Department of Transportation in 2004. The project redirected the river's flow through the use of dense piles of spruce logs reinforced by steel piles; the highway previously underwent four emergency repairs in the area that included installation of riprap and other conventional materials. US 101 was relocated onto an expressway bypass of Sequim, Washington, in August 1999 that replaced a congested route on the city's main street, Washington Avenue. The 4.4-mile (7.1 km) project cost $40.7 million (equivalent to $73.9 million in 2025 dollars) to construct and included the installation of warning signals triggered by the presence of nearby Roosevelt elk wearing radio collars for tracking. The 15-mile (24 km) section of the highway between Port Angeles and Sequim was widened to four lanes in November 2014 following a two-year project to fill the final, 3.5-mile (5.6 km) gap. The 12-mile (19 km) section west of Port Angeles along Lake Crescent was rehabilitated from 2017 to 2019 to repave the roadway and repair structures—among them retaining walls and guardrails.

A six-mile (9.7 km) freeway bypass of Willits, California, for the Redwood Highway opened in November 2016 at a cost of $460 million (equivalent to $610 million in 2025 dollars). The bypass was expected to divert away tourists and cause a drop in local sales tax revenue due to lost traffic. A portion of US 101 in the North Bay region near San Francisco, nicknamed the "Novato Narrows", was widened to three lanes with the addition of an HOV lane; construction on the 5-mile (8.0 km) section began in 2011 and is scheduled to be completed in 2026. A four-phase widening through the Santa Barbara area to add a third lane in each direction began construction in 2008. Its final phase is estimated to cost $700 million and be completed in 2027. The world's largest urban wildlife crossing, named the Wallis Annenberg Wildlife Crossing, is under construction over US 101 in Agoura Hills, California, and is scheduled to open in 2026.

== Major intersections ==
California
I-5 in Los Angeles
I-10 in Los Angeles
SR 110 to I-110 in Los Angeles
SR 134 / SR 170 in Los Angeles
I-405 in Los Angeles
I-280 / I-680 in San Jose
I-880 in San Jose
SR 92 in San Mateo
I-380 on the San Bruno–South San Francisco city line
I-280 in San Francisco
I-80 in San Francisco
SR 1 in San Francisco
I-580 in San Rafael
SR 299 in Arcata
US 199 near Crescent City
Oregon
OR 38 in Reedsport
OR 126 in Florence
US 20 in Newport
OR 22 at Hebo
US 26 near Cannon Beach
US 30 in Astoria
Washington
US 101 Alt. near Ilwaco
SR 4 near Naselle
US 12 in Aberdeen
SR 20 at Discovery Bay
SR 3 near Shelton
SR 8 near Olympia
I-5 in Tumwater

== See also ==
- Special routes of U.S. Route 101
