= Oregon Route 255 =

State highway in Curry County, Oregon, US

Oregon Route 255
- Route 255 highlighted in red

Route information
- Maintained by ODOT
- Length: 27.60 mi (44.42 km)
- Existed: 2003–present

Major junctions
- South end: US 101 in Brookings
- US 101 near Gold Beach; US 101 near Gold Beach
- North end: US 101 near Gold Beach

Location
- Country: United States
- State: Oregon
- County: Curry

Highway system
- Oregon Highways; Interstate; US; State; Named; Scenic
| ← OR 251 | → OR 260 |

Oregon Route 255 (OR 255) is an Oregon state highway running from U.S. Route 101 (US 101) near Gold Beach to US 101 near Brookings. OR 255 is known as the Carpenterville Highway No. 255 (see Oregon highways and routes). It is 27.60 miles (44.42 km) long and runs north–south, entirely within Curry County.

OR 255 was established in 2003 as part of Oregon's project to assign route numbers to highways that previously were not assigned.

== Route description ==
OR 255 begins at an intersection with US 101 approximately four miles south of Gold Beach and heads south 4.81 miles (7.74 km) to an intersection with US 101. It then overlaps US 101 for 1.64 miles (2.64 km). After the concurrency ends, OR 255 continues south through Carpenterville, ending at an intersection with US 101 approximately one mile north of Brookings.

== History ==
OR 255 is a former section of U.S. 101. OR 255 was assigned to the Carpenterville Highway in 2003.

On February 26, 2019, the Hooskanadan Slide took out a nearly quarter-mile long section of U.S. 101, causing the road to slough away in places and buckle in others. ODOT closed the highway at milepost 344; OR 255 served as a detour for a short time. Travelers were advised that the Carpenterville Highway is a narrow, winding road, with extreme elevation changes, spots of gravel, and a spot that is reduced to a single lane. Commercial traffic is restricted on the road; ODOT established checkpoints at both ends of the highway to enforce the restrictions when the route served as a detour.

Trucks that attempted to travel between Brookings (or points south) and Pistol River (or points north) were ushered to use US 199 in Crescent City to Interstate 5 in Grants Pass, then north to Winston and then heading west on OR 42 back to U.S. 101. Truckers that needed to circle back to Gold Beach or Pistol River were told to follow OR 42S from Coquille to Bandon; traffic continuing further north on the coast followed OR 42 all the way to Coos Bay. Southbound traffic drove this route in reverse.

== Major intersections ==
The beginning milepoint for OR 255 conforms to the milepoints for US 101. Milepoints are as reported by ODOT and do not necessarily reflect current mileage. Z indicates overlapping mileage due to construction longer than established route, and – indicates negative mileage behind established beginning point. Segments that are locally maintained may be omitted. For routes traversing multiple named state highways, each milepoint is preceded by the corresponding state highway number. The entire route is in Curry County.

| Location | Milepoint | Destinations | Notes |
|---|---|---|---|
| Brookings | 362.27 | US 101 – Brookings, Gold Beach | Southern terminus |
| Pistol River | 341.22 | US 101 | South end of US 101 overlap |
| | 339.68 | US 101 | North end of US 101 overlap |
| | 334.87 | US 101 | Northern terminus |
1.000 mi = 1.609 km; 1.000 km = 0.621 mi: Concurrency terminus
