= Cape Sebastian State Scenic Corridor =

State park in Oregon, U.S.

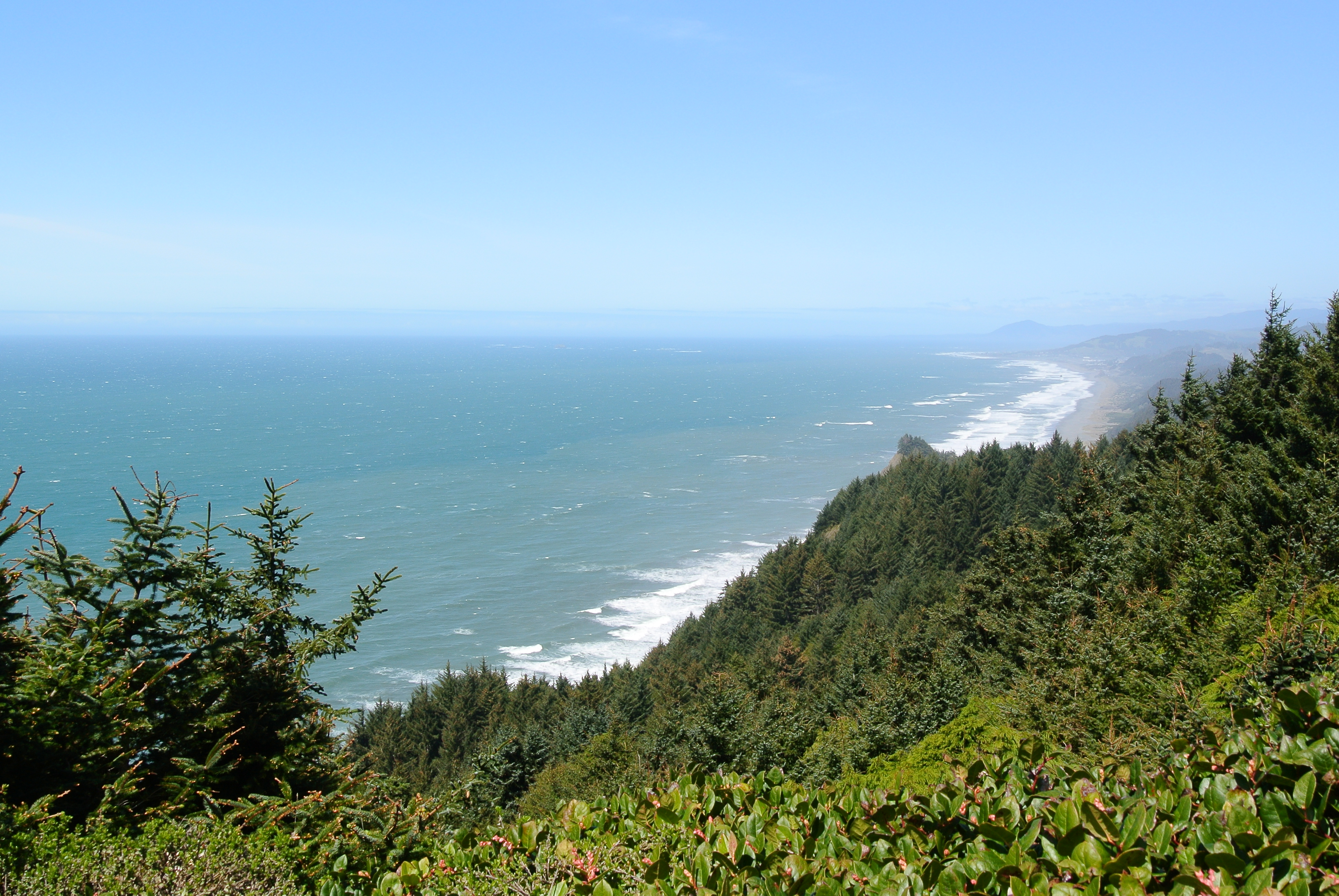
- Looking north from Cape Sebastian

- Location within Oregon Location within the United States
- Interactive map of Cape Sebastian State Scenic Corridor
- Type: Public, state
- Location: Curry County, Oregon
- Nearest city: Gold Beach
- Coordinates: 42°19′56″N 124°25′40″W
- Operator: Oregon Parks and Recreation Department

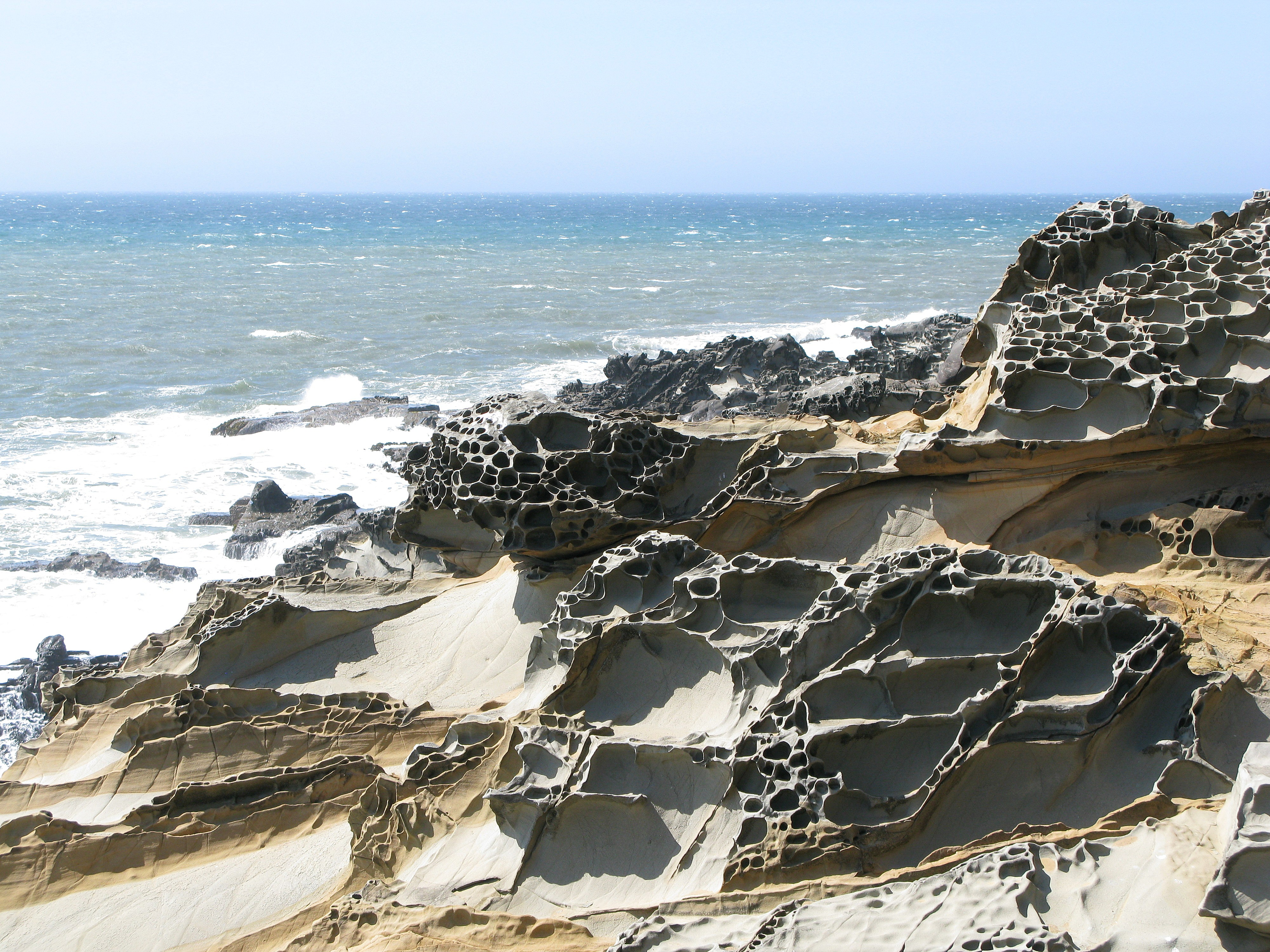
Rock formations at Cape Sebastian

Cape Sebastian State Scenic Corridor is a state park in the U.S. state of Oregon, administered by the Oregon Parks and Recreation Department. It is between Pistol River and Gold Beach on the Pacific coastline and accessed via U.S. Route 101, with a pass elevation of approximately 740 feet (230 m), which is the second highest point of the highway in Oregon. The park includes an overlook and the 3.3-mile (5.3 km) Cape Sebastian Trail.

== See also ==
- List of Oregon state parks
