= Old Youngs Bay Bridge =

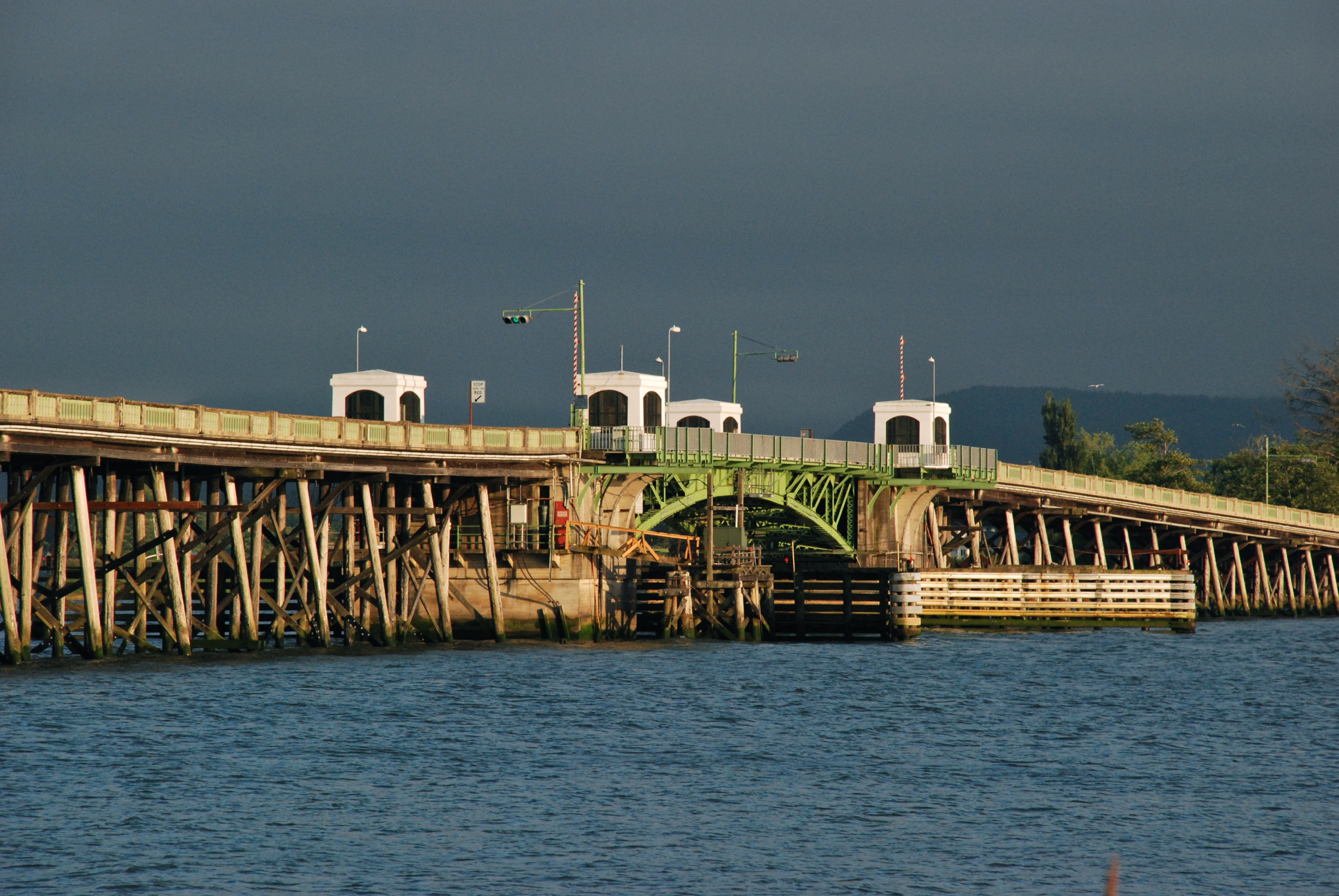
- Coordinates: 46.168795°N 123.838133°W
- Carries: US 101 Bus.
- Crosses: Youngs Bay
- Locale: Astoria, Oregon

Characteristics
- Design: Bascule bridge
- Material: Steel
- Total length: 1,766.2 feet (538.3 m)

History
- Designer: Conde McCullough
- Construction end: 1921

The Old Youngs Bay Bridge is a bascule bridge across Youngs Bay in Astoria, Oregon, completed in 1921. Conde McCullough was responsible for designing this bridge, his first for Oregon.

The bridge consists of two 75-foot (23 m) steel bascule leaves approached over a pile trestle and timber spans. It has a total length of 1,766 feet (538 m). The bridge features early versions of McCullough's signature accent elements, with Art Moderne concrete pylons topped by light fixtures flanking the landings at either end of the bridge.

== See also ==
- List of bridges documented by the Historic American Engineering Record in Oregon
- New Youngs Bay Bridge

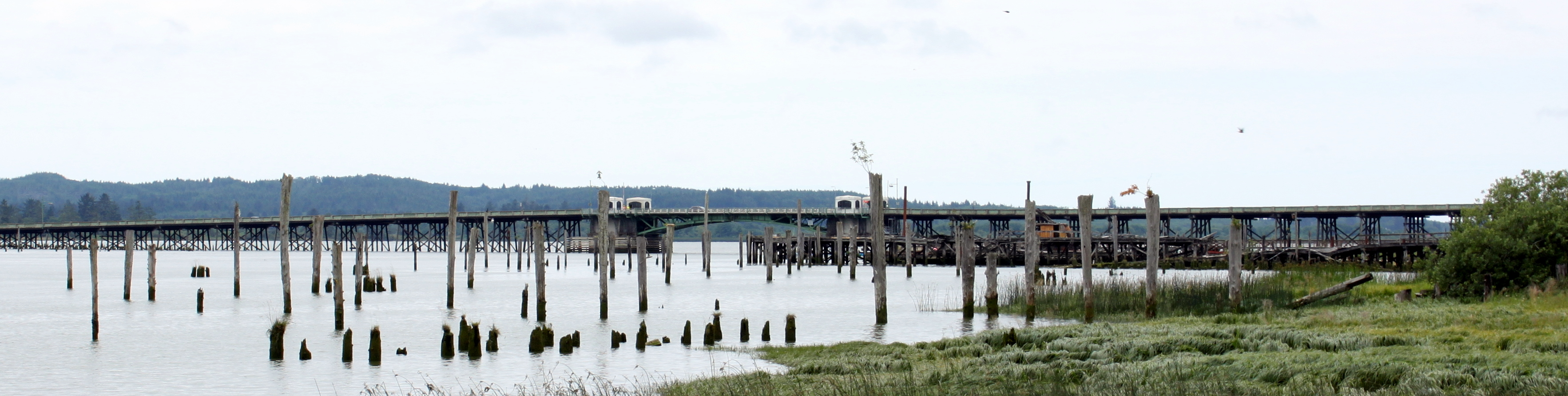
Far picture of the bridge
