= New Youngs Bay Bridge =

Vertical-lift roadbridge in Oregon, United States

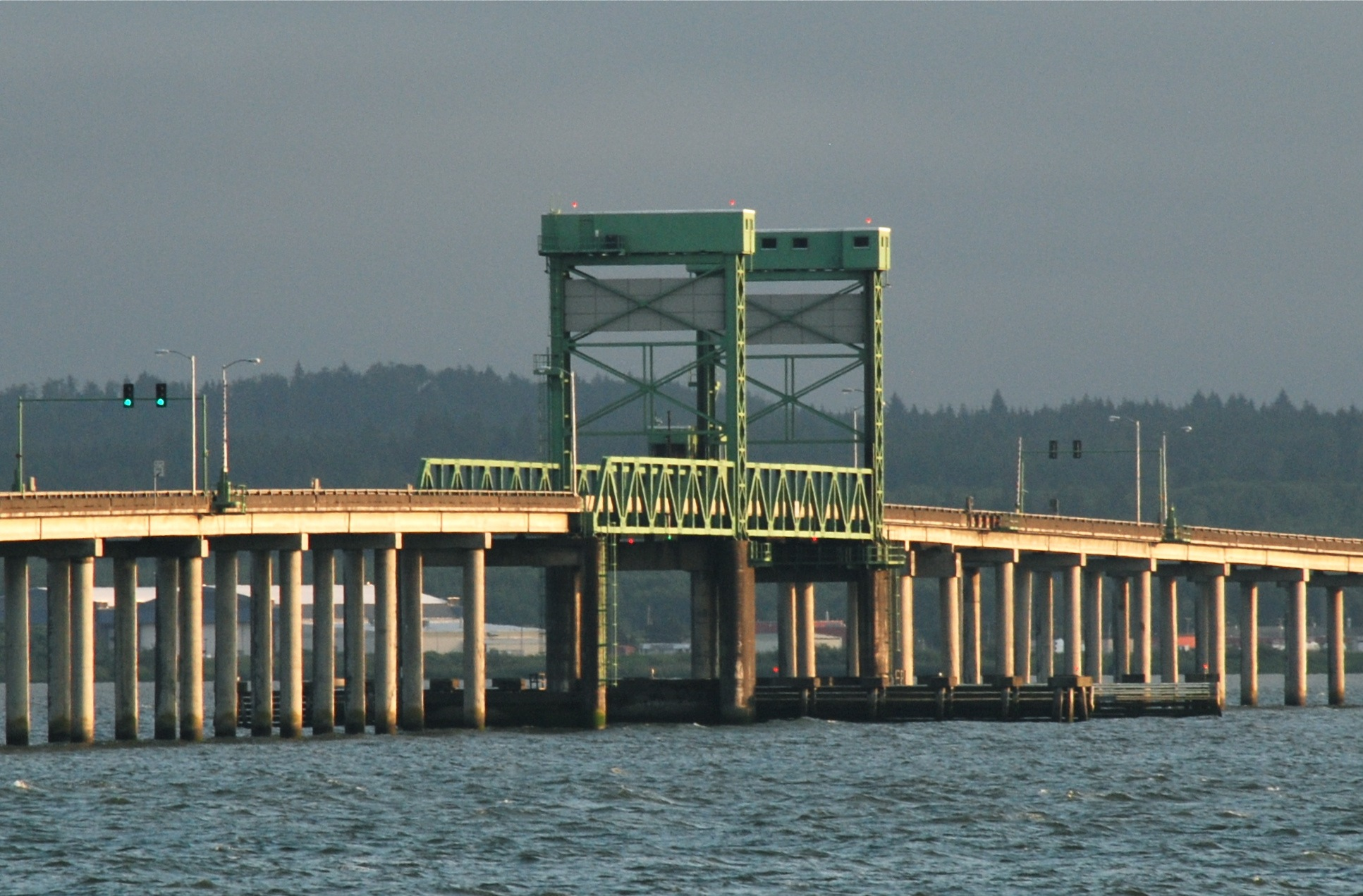
- Coordinates: 46.17655°N 123.86831°W
- Carries: US 101
- Crosses: Youngs Bay
- Locale: Astoria-Warrenton, Oregon

Characteristics
- Design: Vertical-lift bridge
- Total length: 4,200 feet (1,300 m)

History
- Inaugurated: August 29, 1964

The New Youngs Bay Bridge is a vertical-lift bridge over Youngs Bay on U.S. Route 101 (US 101) between Astoria and Warrenton. Including the approaches, it is 4,200 feet (1,300 m) long and was completed in 1964. The road bridge had been proposed since 1948 and was approved by the state government in the late 1950s. The routing across Youngs Bay for US 101 was chosen in 1955 over a more inland alignment that would have avoided the bay entirely. Construction began in March 1963 and was dedicated on August 29, 1964.

The bridge was built to the west of, closely in parallel to, a 1.6-mile (2.6 km) railroad trestle which also crossed the bay. It was built in 1896 for the Astoria and Columbia River Railway Company. The New Youngs Bay Bridge passed over the top of the railway bridge near the north river bank. The railroad bridge was used for the last time in 1982 and was dismantled in 1986.

== See also ==
- List of bridges on U.S. Route 101 in Oregon
- Old Youngs Bay Bridge
