= U.S. Route 101 in Oregon =

Section of U.S. Highway in Oregon, United States

U.S. Highway 101
- Oregon Coast Highway
- US 101 highlighted in red

Route information
- Maintained by ODOT
- Length: 363.11 mi (584.37 km)
- Existed: November 11, 1926–present
- Tourist routes: Lewis and Clark Trail; Pacific Coast Scenic Byway

Major junctions
- South end: US 101 at California state line
- US 20 in Newport; US 26 near Cannon Beach; US 30 in Astoria
- North end: US 101 at Washington state line

Location
- Country: United States
- State: Oregon
- Counties: Curry, Coos, Douglas, Lane, Lincoln, Tillamook, Clatsop

Highway system
- United States Numbered Highway System; List; Special; Divided; Oregon Highways; Interstate; US; State; Named; Scenic
← OR 99W	→ OR 103

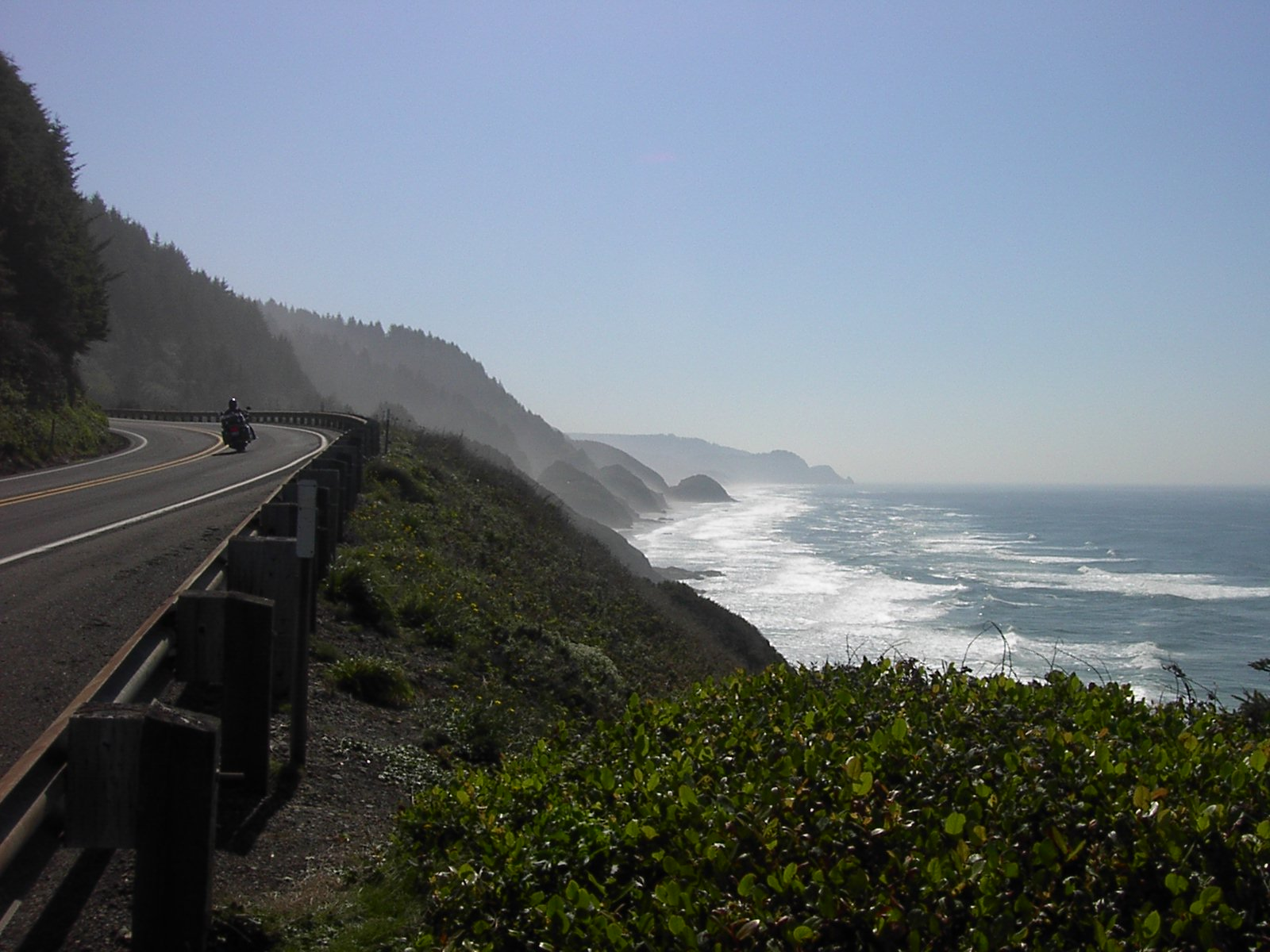
US 101 along the Oregon coast

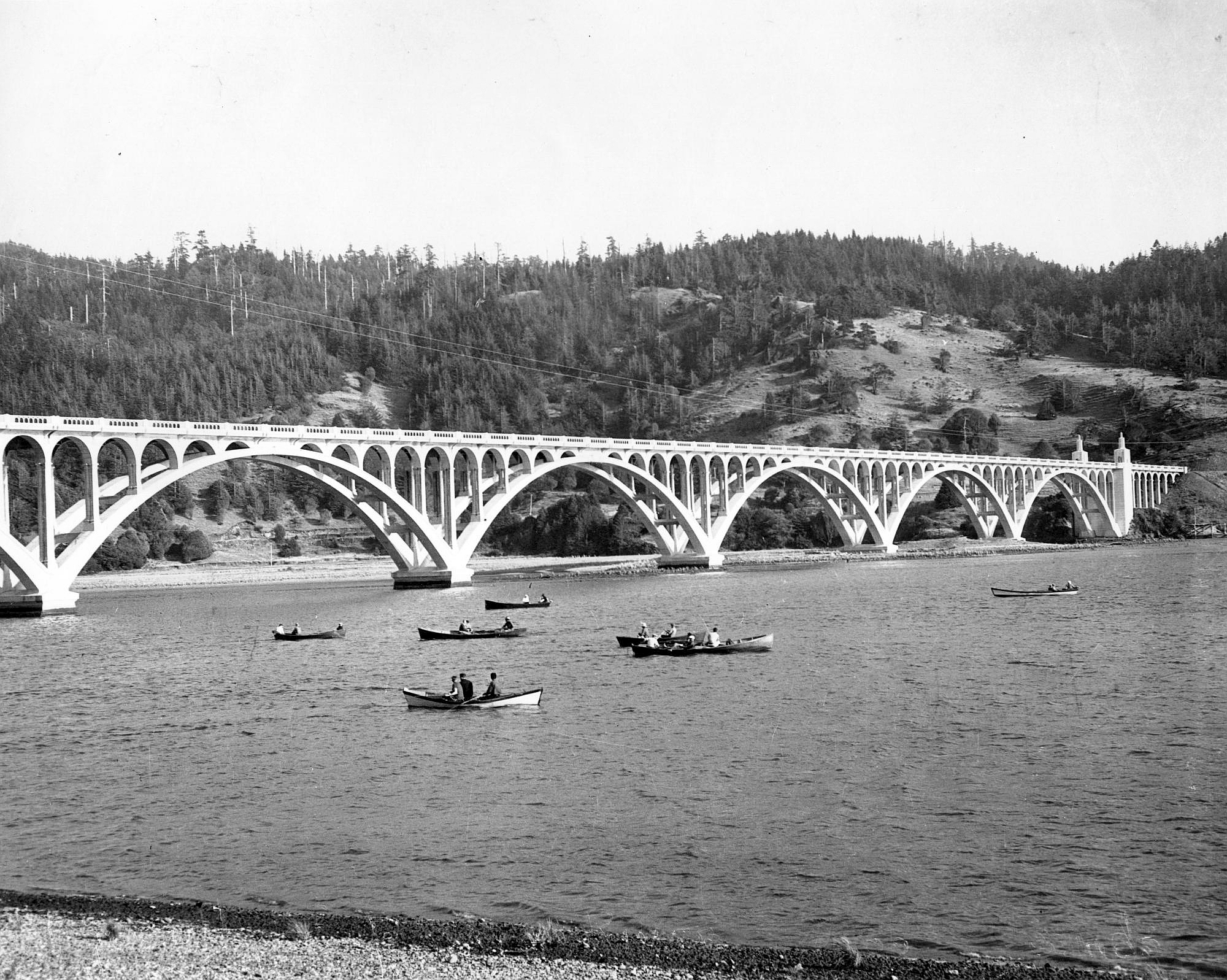
The Oregon Coast Highway crossing the Rogue River

U.S. Route 101 (US 101), is a major north–south U.S. Highway in Oregon that runs through the state along the western Oregon coastline near the Pacific Ocean. It runs from the California border, south of Brookings, to the Washington state line on the Columbia River, between Astoria, Oregon, and Megler, Washington.

US 101 is designated as the Oregon Coast Highway No. 9 (see Oregon highways and routes), as it serves the Oregon Coast region. Much of the highway runs between the Pacific Ocean and the Oregon Coast Range; thus, US 101 is frequently mountainous in character. For most of its length it is a two-lane undivided highway. Many parts of the highway are subject to closure due to landslides caused by excessive rainfall, and in many parts of the coast, US 101 is the only viable route connecting certain coastal communities. Thus, in many cases when landslides block US 101, the detour requires traveling inland over the Coast Range to alternative north–south routes in the Willamette Valley and then back west over the Coast Range again.

US 101 is often the main street through coastal towns in Oregon, which can cause significant traffic delays. This is especially true in Lincoln City, where geography and tourism combine to create traffic problems.

== Route description ==
=== Brookings to Coos Bay ===
The run of US 101 in Oregon (from south to north) starts at the border with California, south of the twin cities of Brookings and Harbor (and north of Crescent City, California). The highway is mostly a two-lane road, running along the Southern Oregon coastline. Access to this section (other than 101) is via U.S. Route 199 or Oregon Route 42. Access is also possible through National Forest Route 23 (NF-23 - Bear Camp) but that route is not maintained through the winter months.

Other coastal towns in this stretch of US 101 include Pistol River, Gold Beach, Wedderburn, and Port Orford. North of Port Orford is the Cape Blanco region, and the westernmost point in the U.S. Highway system. After passing through Sixes, Denmark, and Langlois, US 101 enters the resort town of Bandon on the mouth of the Coquille River. Just north of Bandon, the highway crosses the river on the Bullards Bridge.

The stretch of US 101 between Brookings and Gold Beach includes the highest bridge in Oregon, the Thomas Creek Bridge. With its roadbed at 345 feet (105 m) above Thomas Creek, it is the 15th highest bridge in the U.S.

North of Bandon, US 101 heads inland for a while, while a spur route provides access to the Charleston Peninsula. Approaching the city of Coos Bay, US 101 becomes an expressway after an interchange with Oregon Route 42, then soon enters the downtown core. It continues through Coos Bay (the city) along the western edge of Coos Bay (the bay), soon entering the city of North Bend. North of North Bend, it crosses over the bay on the Conde McCullough Memorial Bridge, followed by a second bridge over Haynes Inlet.

=== Coos Bay to Lincoln City ===
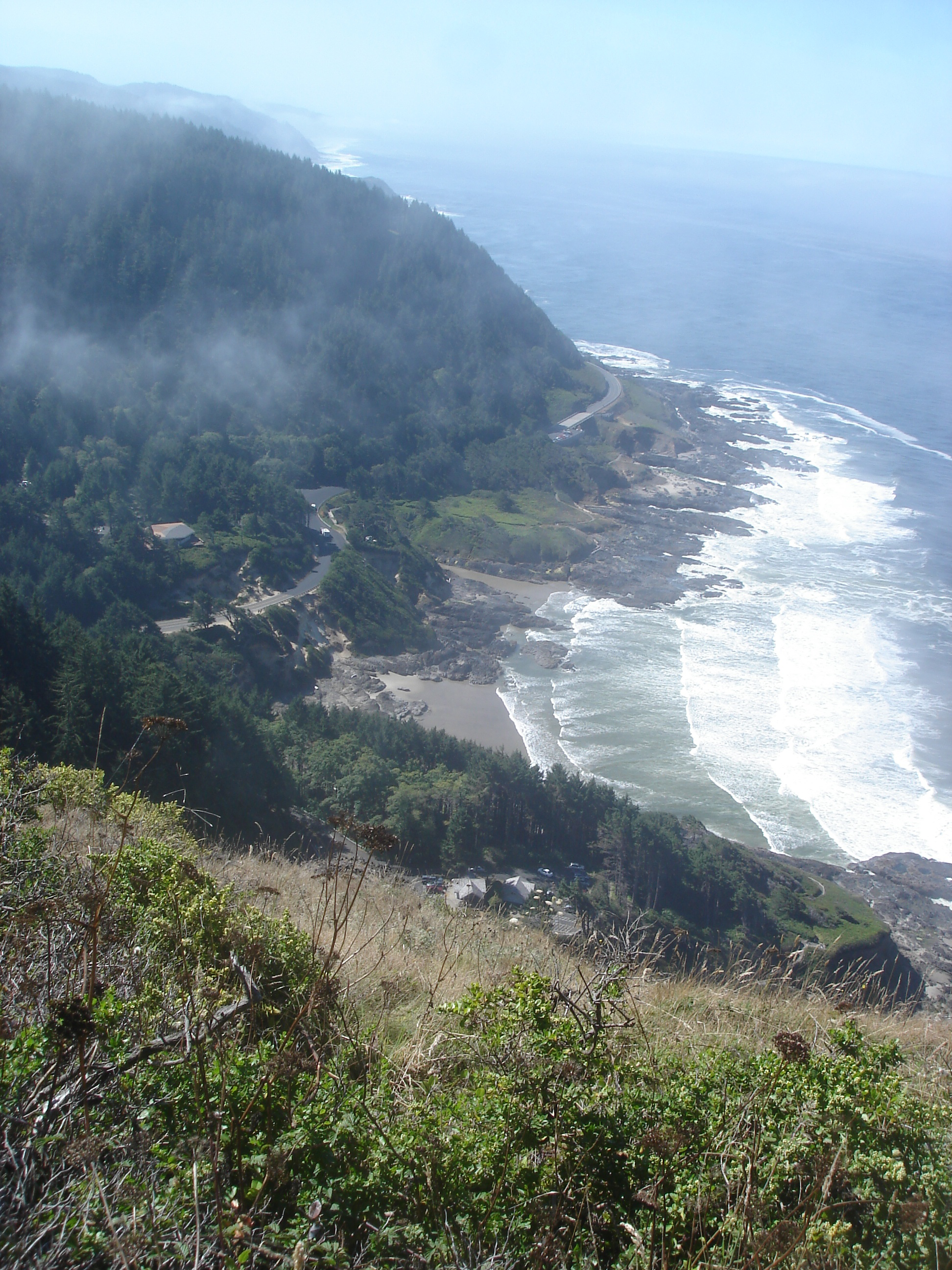
View from Cape Perpetua lookout of Highway 101 winding along the Oregon coast south of Cape Perpetua

North of Coos Bay, the highway runs along the eastern flank of the Oregon Dunes National Recreation Area, through the communities of North Bend, Hauser, Lakeside, and Winchester Bay before coming into the city of Reedsport on the mouth of the Umpqua River. The highway continues north from there, passing through the dunes and through the towns of Gardiner, Westlake, Dunes City, and Glenada. The next major town is Florence on the Siuslaw River.

The next stretch of US 101 (between Florence and Newport) closely follows the coastline, providing a wide view of the ocean. Towns between these two cities include Yachats, Waldport, and Seal Rock. Eventually, the highway crosses the Yaquina Bay Bridge into Newport. Just before the bridge lies the Oregon Coast Aquarium; on the other side of the bridge is the famed Newport waterfront. Also in Newport, US Route 20 has its western Terminus at US 101.

The next stretch of 101, between Newport and Lincoln City, is rather mountainous, as the Coast Range protrudes into the ocean. Cities on the route include Depoe Bay, Otter Rock (accessible via a side road), and the Gleneden Beach/Salishan area, famed for its resorts. Near Siletz Bay is the abandoned community of Kernville, followed by Lincoln City.

=== Lincoln City to Astoria ===
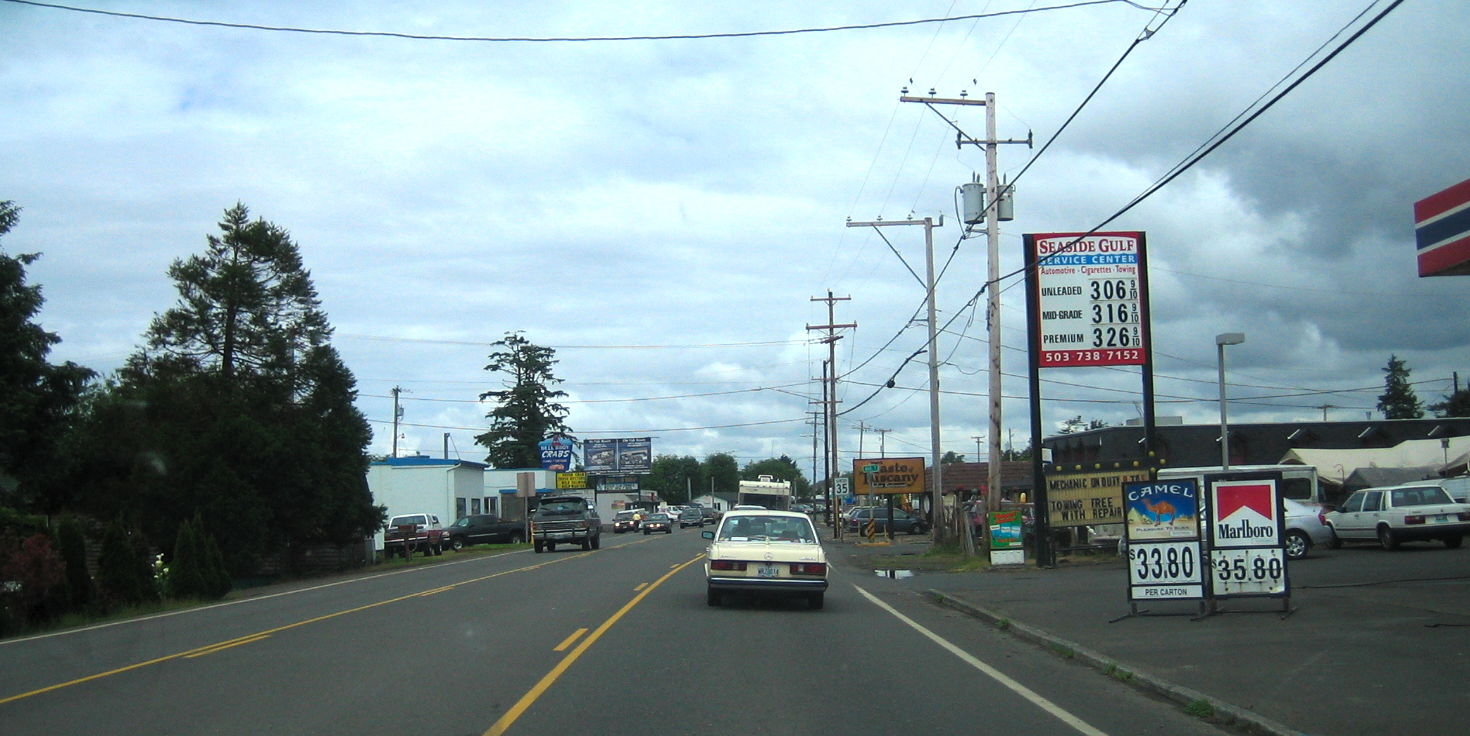
US 101 through downtown Seaside

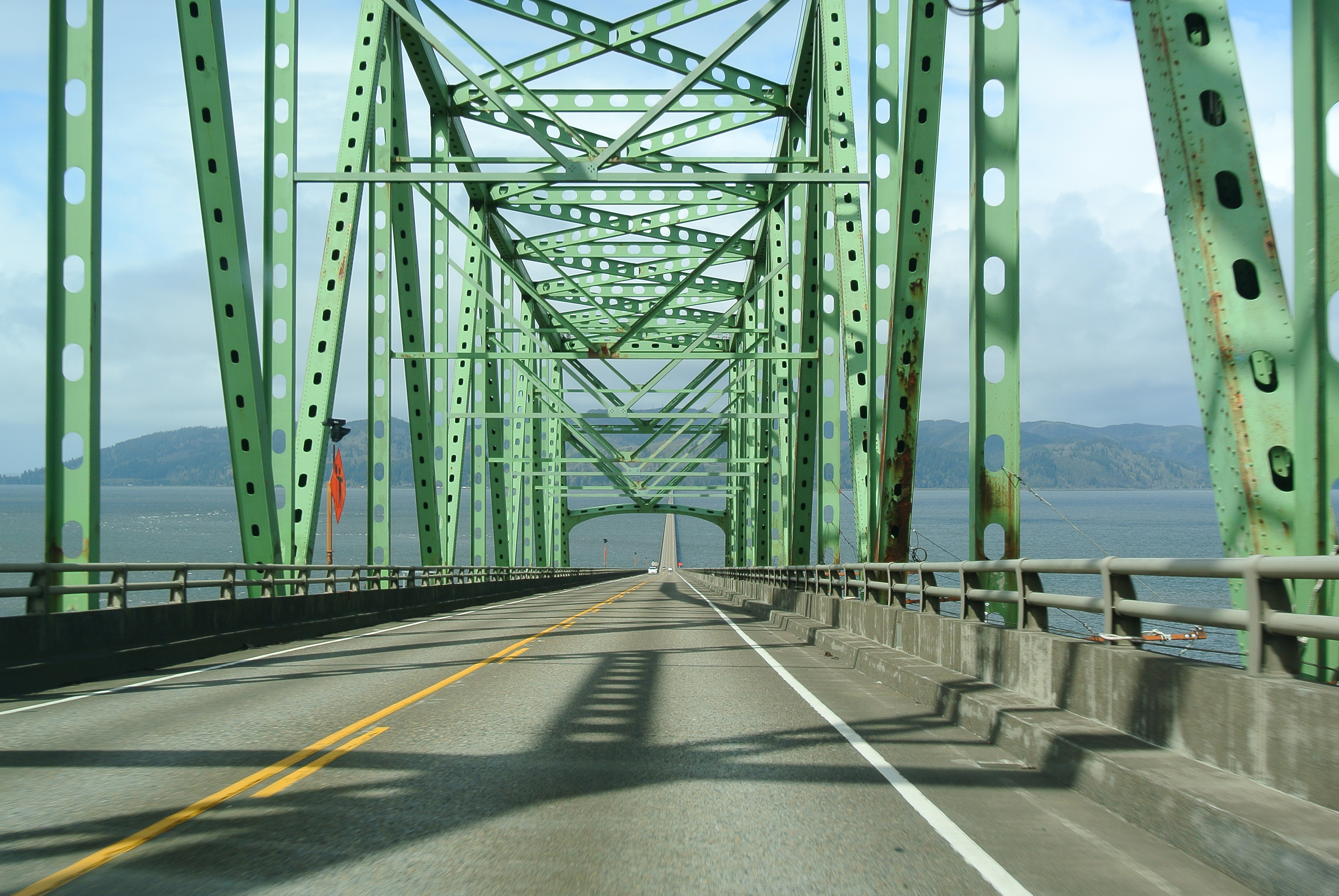
US 101 at the Astoria-Megler Bridge, heading north

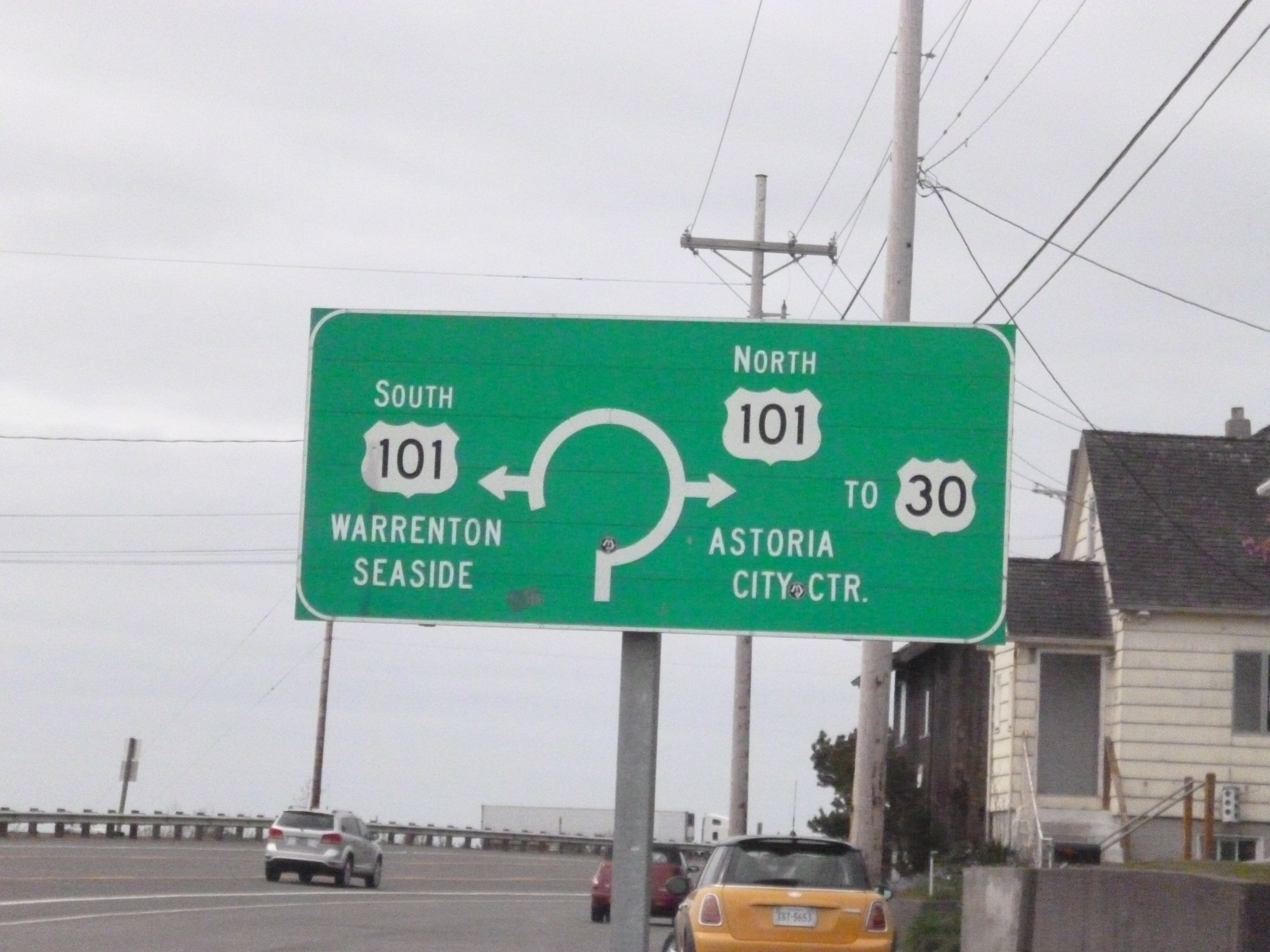
US 101 & Business 101 sign

The stretch of US 101 through Lincoln City is infamous for its clogged traffic; the city is over seven miles (11 km) long (but only a few blocks wide in spots), and is sandwiched between the ocean on the west, and Devils Lake and mountains to the east. In many parts of town, the highway is a two-lane road. Adding to the traffic is a casino in the northern part of town. Much of the traffic departs US 101 north of Lincoln City, at an interchange with Oregon Route 18.

North of Lincoln City US 101 climbs over Cascade Head to the summit at 780 feet above sea level. This is the highest point of 101 in Oregon. To the north of Cascade Head is the town of Neskowin and the Nestucca Bay area. A side road, the Three Capes Scenic Route, provides access to the seaside towns of Pacific City and Sandlake, then goes over Cape Lookout and on to Netarts, Oceanside and Cape Meares before meeting 101 again at Tillamook. 101 instead heads inland, passing through the towns of Cloverdale, Hebo, Beaver and Hemlock. The next major town is the city of Tillamook.

North of Tillamook, the highway passes on the eastern shore of Tillamook Bay, through towns such as Bay City and Garibaldi, before reuniting with the ocean. It then continues north along the Pacific through towns such as Rockaway Beach and Nedonna Beach; the next major towns are Nehalem and Manzanita, both on Nehalem Bay. The highway then continues north along the coastline through rugged terrain until it reaches the city of Cannon Beach. Unlike most coastal cities in Oregon, a bypass (in two-lane freeway configuration) was built around Cannon Beach; US 101 follows the bypass alignment. A few miles north of Cannon Beach is an interchange with U.S. Route 26, followed by the city of Seaside. (Until recently, U.S. 26 continued north towards Astoria, sharing an alignment with US 101; however ODOT truncated U.S. 26 to its current terminus at the interchange with 101 several years ago.)

North of Seaside, US 101 follows the coastal plain through cities such as Gearhart; a spur route (Oregon Route 104) provides access to Fort Stevens State Park. US 101 soon enters the city of Warrenton, Oregon (where Business 101, which is more of a scenic route, providing access to the Astoria-Warrenton Airport, Fort Clatsop, and Miles Crossing) and then crosses Youngs Bay into Astoria, Oregon. 101 passes through the northwestern edge of Astoria, until an intersection with the western terminus of U.S. Route 30. At this intersection, 101 climbs an access road onto the Astoria-Megler Bridge over the Columbia River and crosses into the state of Washington.

== History ==
The Oregon Coast had historically been isolated and relied on boats and beach routes as their primary means of inter-city transportation. Plans to build an automobile highway were formed in the early 20th century and formalized as the Roosevelt Coast Military Highway, which was approved for construction in 1919 as part of a statewide highway development program funded by a one-cent gas tax. Construction of the highway began in 1921 and was later designated as part of US 101 in 1926 and renamed the Oregon Coast Highway in 1931.

The highway originally had six ferry crossings at major rivers and bays that were operated by private companies until their acquisition by the state government in 1927. The state ran these ferries on extended schedules to cope with demand, but they proved inadequate for the growing number of motorists on the coast. A set of five bridges designed by state engineer Conde B. McCullough and funded by the federal government's New Deal programs were constructed between 1934 and 1936 to replace the ferries. The Oregon Coast Highway was declared complete on October 3, 1936, at a cost of $25 million to construct.

The state government built several new sections of US 101 in the 1950s and 1960s as part of a $30 million modernization program that shortened the length of US 101 by 25 miles (40 km). These projects reconstructed 165 miles (266 km) of the highway to more modern standards, including 53-mile (85 km) of new highway from Brookings to Gold Beach that opened in December 1961 and eliminated 398 existing curves. A direct route from Bandon to Coos Bay to bypass Coquille opened in December 1960; the old alignment serving Coquille was re-designated as OR 42 and OR 42S. US 101 was realigned between Seaside and Astoria in 1964 using a new bridge over Youngs Bay.

In 1966, Oregon legislators proposed adding US 101 or a parallel corridor to the Interstate Highway System as part of road upgrades between Coos Bay and Astoria.

In 2015, all of US 101 in Oregon was designated as the Persian Gulf, Afghanistan, and Iraq Veterans Memorial Highway by the state legislature.

Sections of the coastal highway are at high landslide risk, particularly in Southwest Oregon. In February 2019, the Hooskanaden Landslide covered a section of US 101 near Brookings and shifted the roadway by 150 feet (46 m), rendering it impassible. A new alignment was constructed by ODOT in 2020.

== Major intersections ==
Note: mileposts do not reflect actual mileage because of realignments.

County	Location	mi	km	Destinations	Notes
Curry		363.11	584.37	US 101 south – Crescent City, San Francisco	Continuation into California
Curry	Brookings	354.83	571.04	Dawson Road (Carpenterville Highway No. 255 north)	
Curry		339.71	546.71	Carpenterville Highway No. 255 south – Pistol River, Carpenterville	Southern end of Highway 255 overlap
Curry		337.97	543.91	Carpenterville Highway No. 255 north	Northern end of Highway 255 overlap
Curry		334.87	538.92	Cape View Loop Road (Carpenterville Highway No. 255 south)	
Curry	Port Orford	300.99	484.40	9th Street (Port Orford Highway No. 251) – Port Orford Heads State Park	
Curry		296.48	477.14	Cape Blanco Highway No. 250 – Cape Blanco State Park	
Coos	Bandon	261.57	420.96	OR 42S east – Coquille	
Coos		244.31	393.18	OR 42 east – Coquille, Roseburg	Interchange
Coos	Bunker Hill	239.51	385.45	OR 241 – Coos River, Allegany	
Coos	Coos Bay	238.21	383.36	Commercial Avenue – City Center, Charleston, State Parks	Former Empire–Coos Bay Highway No. 243
Coos	North Bend	235.42	378.87	OR 540 west – Charleston, State Parks	
Douglas	Reedsport	211.58	340.51	OR 38 east – Drain, Eugene, Roseburg	
Lane	Florence	190.23	306.15	OR 126 east – Mapleton, Eugene	
Lincoln	Waldport	155.90	250.90	OR 34 – Alsea, Corvallis	
Lincoln	Newport	140.36	225.89	US 20 east – Toledo, Corvallis	
Lincoln		132.45	213.16	Otter Rock Highway No. 182 – Otter Rock, Devils Punch Bowl State Park	
Lincoln		120.02	193.15	OR 229 south – Kernville, Siletz River	
Lincoln	Otis Junction	105.09	169.13	OR 18 east – McMinnville, Salem, Portland	Interchange
Tillamook		91.37	147.05	OR 130 – Little Nestucca River	
Tillamook	Hebo	84.94	136.70	OR 22 east – Valley Junction, McMinnville	
Tillamook	Tillamook	65.77	105.85	OR 6 east (Third Street) – Portland, Forest Grove	
Tillamook	Tillamook	65.77	105.85	OR 131 (Third Street) – Netarts	Southbound only
Tillamook		46.50	74.83	OR 53 – Mohler, Portland	
Clatsop	Cannon Beach	30.62	49.28	Tolovana Park	Interchange
Clatsop	Cannon Beach	29.53	47.52	Sunset Boulevard – Cannon Beach City Center, Ecola State Park	Interchange
Clatsop	Cannon Beach	28.37	45.66	Lewis and Clark Trail – Cannon Beach City Center, Ecola State Park	Interchange; no northbound exit
Clatsop		25.27	40.67	US 26 – Portland	Interchange
Clatsop		9.48	15.26	Columbia Beach Road (OR 104) – Warrenton, Hammond, Fort Stevens State Park	
Clatsop	Warrenton	7.53	12.12	US 101 Bus. north – Lewis and Clark National Historical Park Fort Clatsop Visitor Center	Northbound entrance and exit
Clatsop	Warrenton	7.53	12.12	Alternate Highway 101 (OR 104S)	
Clatsop	Warrenton	7.07	11.38	Marlin Avenue (Warrenton–Astoria Highway No. 105) – Warrenton, U.S. Coast Guard Air Station Astoria, Lewis and Clark National Historical Park	
Clatsop	Warrenton	6.57	10.57	Harbor Drive (Warrenton–Astoria Highway No. 105) – Warrenton, Hammond, Fort Stevens State Park	
Clatsop	Youngs Bay	4.91	7.90	Youngs Bay Bridge	
Clatsop	Astoria	4.32	6.95	US 101 Bus. south / OR 202 east – Clatsop County Fairgrounds, Jewell	
Clatsop	Astoria	3.80	6.12	US 30 east / Lewis and Clark Trail – Astoria City Center	
Columbia River		0.00	0.00	Astoria–Megler Bridge; Oregon–Washington state line	
Columbia River		0.00	0.00	US 101 north	Continuation into Washington
1.000 mi = 1.609 km; 1.000 km = 0.621 mi: Concurrency terminus; Incomplete access

== See also ==
- List of bridges on U.S. Route 101 in Oregon

U.S. Route 101
Previous state: California	Oregon	Next state: Washington
