= Lewis and Clark River =

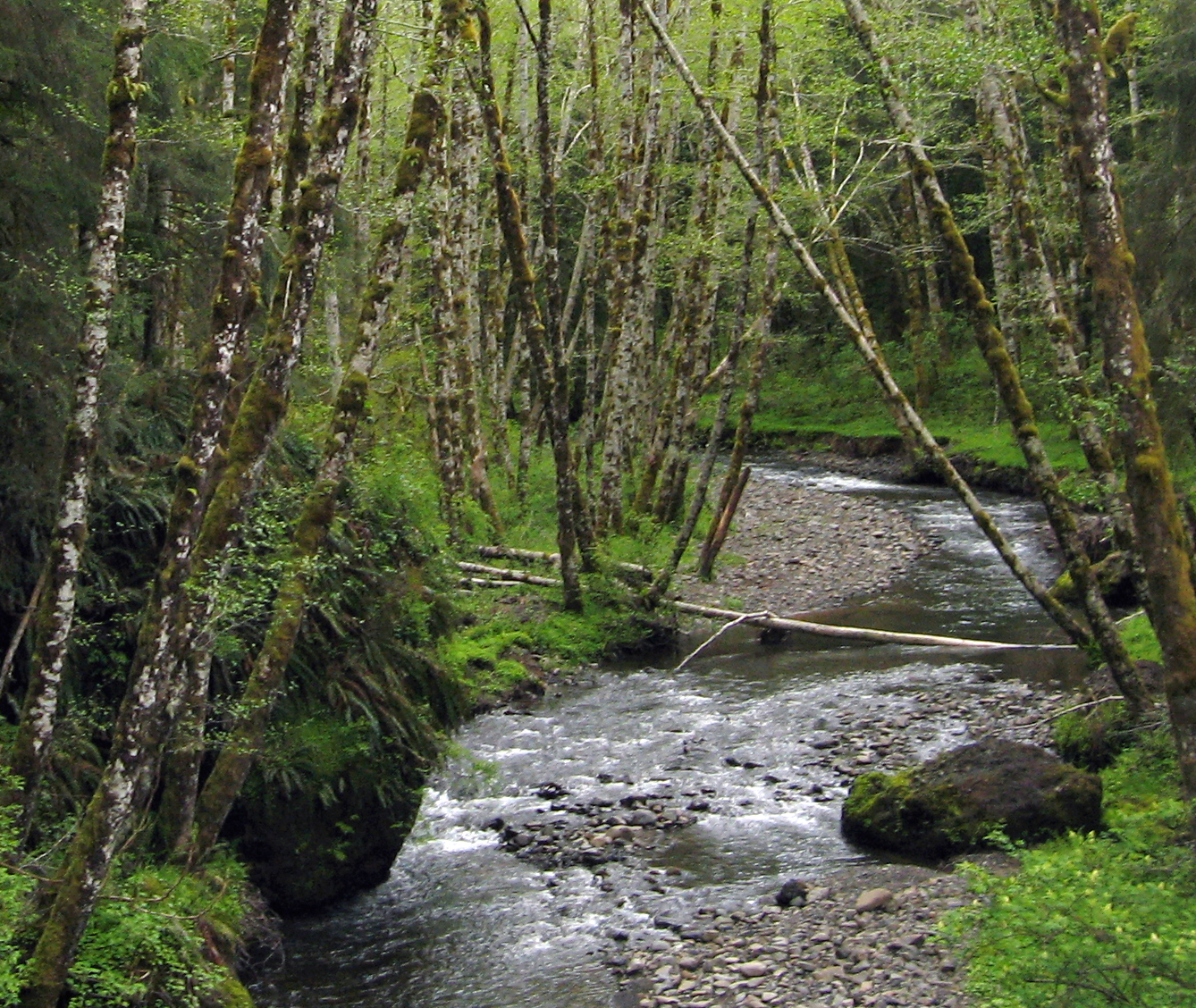
- Lewis and Clark River near its source at Saddle Mountain

- Location of the mouth of the Lewis and Clark River in Oregon
- Etymology: Meriwether Lewis and William Clark
- Native name: Netul (Chinook)

Location
- Country: United States
- State: Oregon
- County: Clatsop County

Physical characteristics
- Source: Northern Oregon Coast Range
  - location: Saddle Mountain, Clatsop County, Oregon
  - coordinates: 45°57′49″N 123°38′21″W
  - elevation: 2,100 ft (640 m)
- Mouth: Youngs River
  - location: Youngs Bay, Clatsop County, Oregon
  - coordinates: 46°10′6″N 123°51′47″W
  - elevation: 3 ft (0.91 m)
- Length: 20 mi (32 km)
- Basin size: 62 sq mi (160 km^{2})

The Lewis and Clark River is a tributary of Youngs River, approximately 20 miles (32 km) long, in northwest Oregon in the United States. It drains 62 square miles (160 km^{2}) of the Northern Oregon Coast Range in the extreme northwest corner of the state, entering Youngs River just above its mouth on the Columbia River at Youngs Bay. Near the river's mouth is the site of former Fort Clatsop of the Lewis and Clark Expedition. The river is named for Meriwether Lewis and William Clark.

== History and parks ==
The river was called the Netul River by Lewis and Clark and the Native American Clatsop people who were living in the area at the time. It continued to be known as the Netul River until 1925, when it was renamed to honor Lewis and Clark. The river flows through Lewis and Clark National Historical Park, which was designated as a National Historical Park in 2004.

== Fish ==
The river is home to bottom-feeding white sturgeon, which is a sport fish in the area. It is also home to an extensive salmon repopulation program, just outside Astoria, Oregon proper, that is currently run by the Oregon Department of Fish and Wildlife. The salmon fry, called "fingerlings" can be seen writhing and jumping within their net-lined pens along the river's eastern banks. The river also supports runs of wild steelhead and cutthroat trout.

== See also ==
- Skipanon River
- List of rivers of Oregon
- List of tributaries of the Columbia River
