= Youngs Bay =

Bay in northwest Oregon (U.S. state)

Coordinates: 46.174828°N 123.865976°W

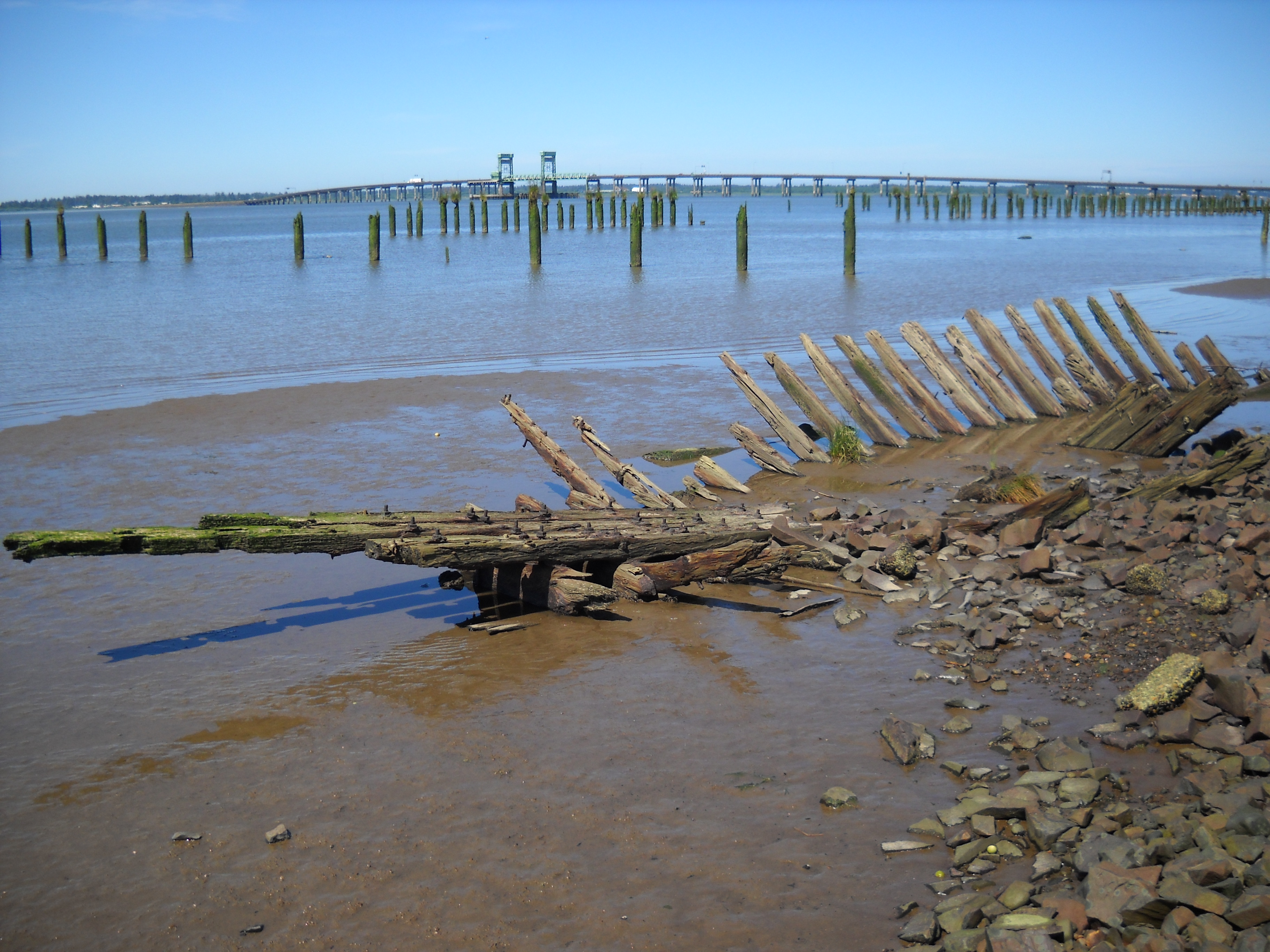
View of the "new" Youngs Bay Bridge from the remains of the sidewheeler T. J. Potter on the northeast shore of Youngs Bay.

Youngs Bay, or Youngs River Bay, is located in the northwestern corner of the U.S. state of Oregon. The Youngs River meets the Columbia River at this point, which is situated between Astoria and Warrenton.

The bay is named for the Youngs River, which was discovered in 1792 by William Robert Broughton of the Vancouver Expedition. The river was named for Admiral Sir George Young of the Royal Navy.

There are two road bridges that cross the bay, with the busiest being the new Youngs Bay Bridge, a vertical-lift bridge completed in 1964, that spans approximately 1.75 miles (2.82 km) and is a two-lane part of U.S. Route 101 running north to south. There is also the Old Youngs Bay Bridge about two miles to the east, completed in 1921. From 1895 to 1986, a 1.6-mile (2.6 km) railroad trestle also crossed the bay. Built in 1896 for the Astoria and Columbia River Railway Company, it was later transferred to the Spokane, Portland and Seattle Railway, and finally to Burlington Northern Railroad. It included a swing-type draw span. The New Youngs Bay Bridge passed over the top of the SP&S bridge near the north river bank. The railroad bridge was used for the last time in 1982 and was dismantled in 1986.

The bay is fished extensively for sturgeon and salmon when in season. Most of the gillnetting community moors and fishes in Youngs Bay. The bay can be seen rising and falling significantly with the tides created where the bay meets the Columbia River, which meets the Pacific Ocean approximately 10 miles (16 km) to the west.

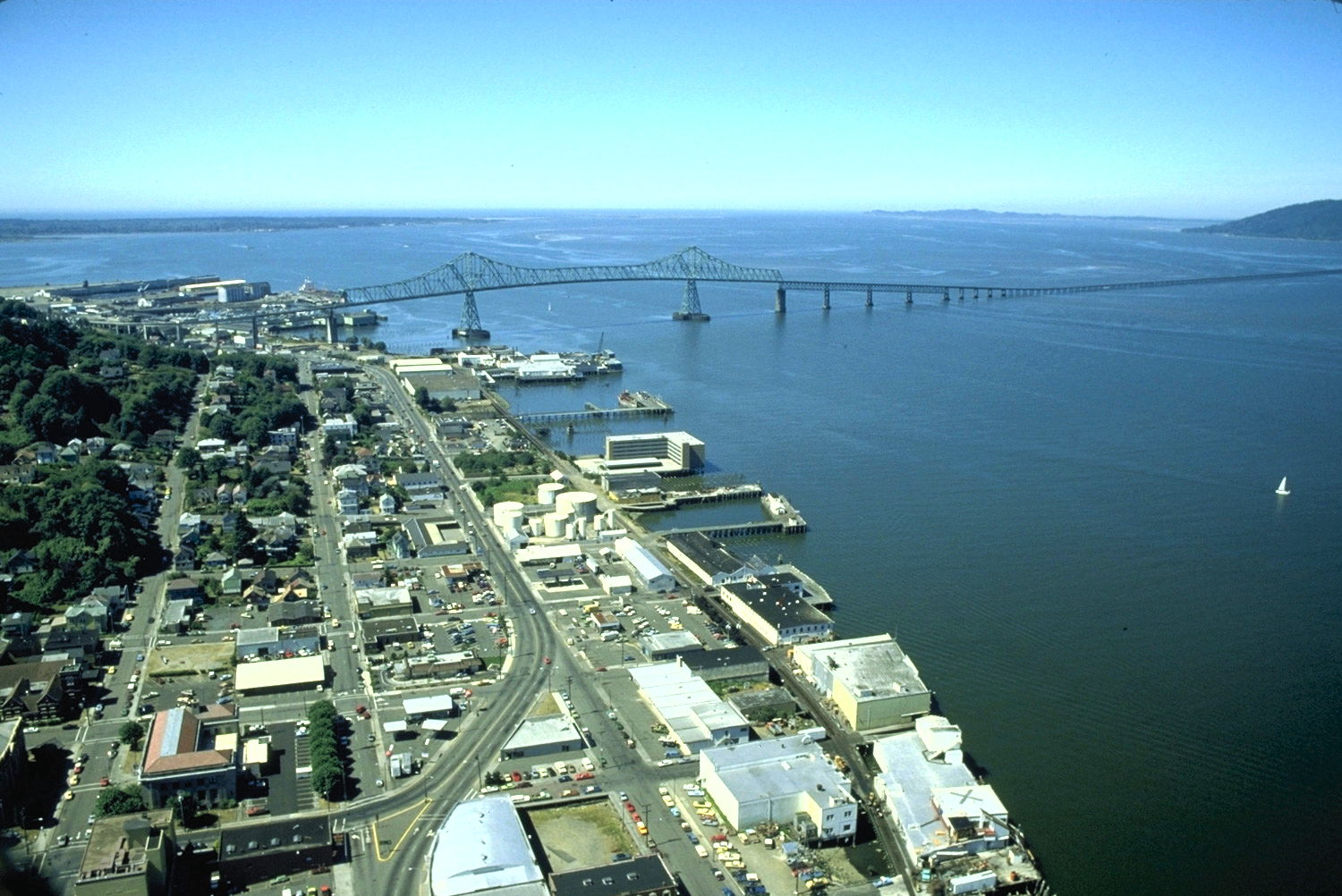
Youngs Bay, seen in the distant left, past Astoria, Oregon; where it meets the Columbia River.
