= Needle cast =

Fungal diseases of conifers

Needle cast is a group of fungal diseases of conifers, sharing the symptom that the infected trees cast their needle leaves. Since most conifers are evergreens, replacing their leaves only slowly, loss of leaves is more serious than in broad-leaved trees, reducing growth.

== Diseases ==
Several fungal diseases of conifers cause needle cast. Among these are diseases caused by ascomycete fungi such as Swiss needle cast, Cyclaneusma needle cast, and diseases caused by oomycete fungi, such as Red needle cast. Since most conifers are evergreens, replacing their leaves only slowly, loss of leaves is more serious than in broad-leaved trees, reducing growth, especially of stands of young trees. Diagnosis requires examination of the fungal spores, as the symptoms are similar to those caused by abiotic factors such as poor nutrition.

=== Caused by ascomycetes ===
Swiss needle cast is caused by the ascomycete Nothophaeocryptopus gaeumannii (order Pleosporales), native to western North America. Damage is minimal in the native area, but is severe when the disease occurs in Europe, where infected needles die and fall within 1 to 3 years.

Cyclaneusma needle cast is caused by an ascomycete in the family Marthamycetaceae; it infects pine trees in North America and New Zealand, especially in cold and wet conditions. It can cause serious losses to growers of Christmas trees if trees are infected in the autumn.

Rhizosphaera needle cast is caused by ascomycetes in the order Sphaeropsidales. Several species of Rhizosphaera can infect trees, with R. kalkhoffii the most common. The disease causes severe defoliation, for instance in spruces. It can infect balsam fir, Douglas fir, western hemlock, and several species of spruces and pines. The unsightliness renders infected blue spruce unsuitable for ornamental uses.

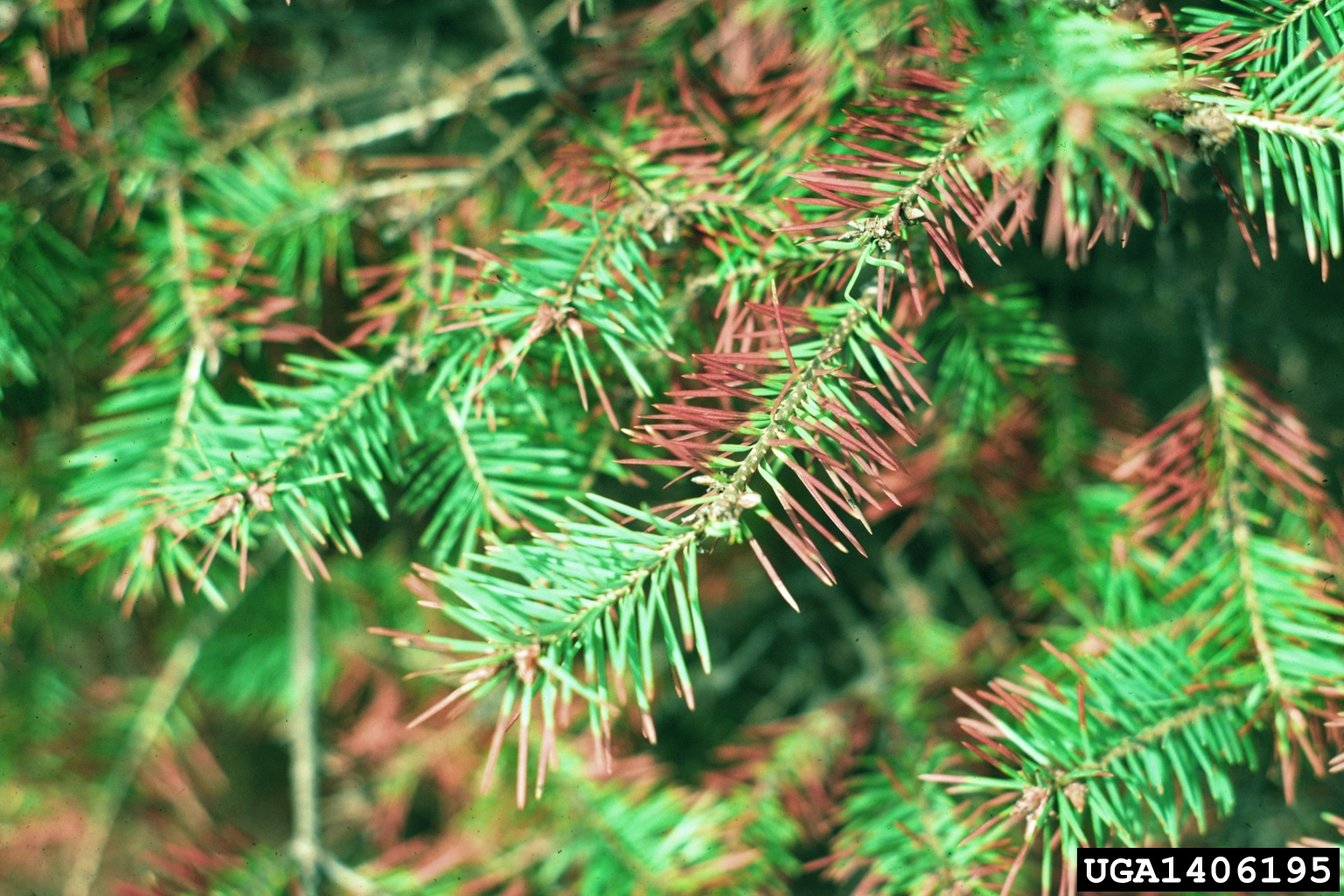
Swiss needle cast, killing leaves of Douglas fir

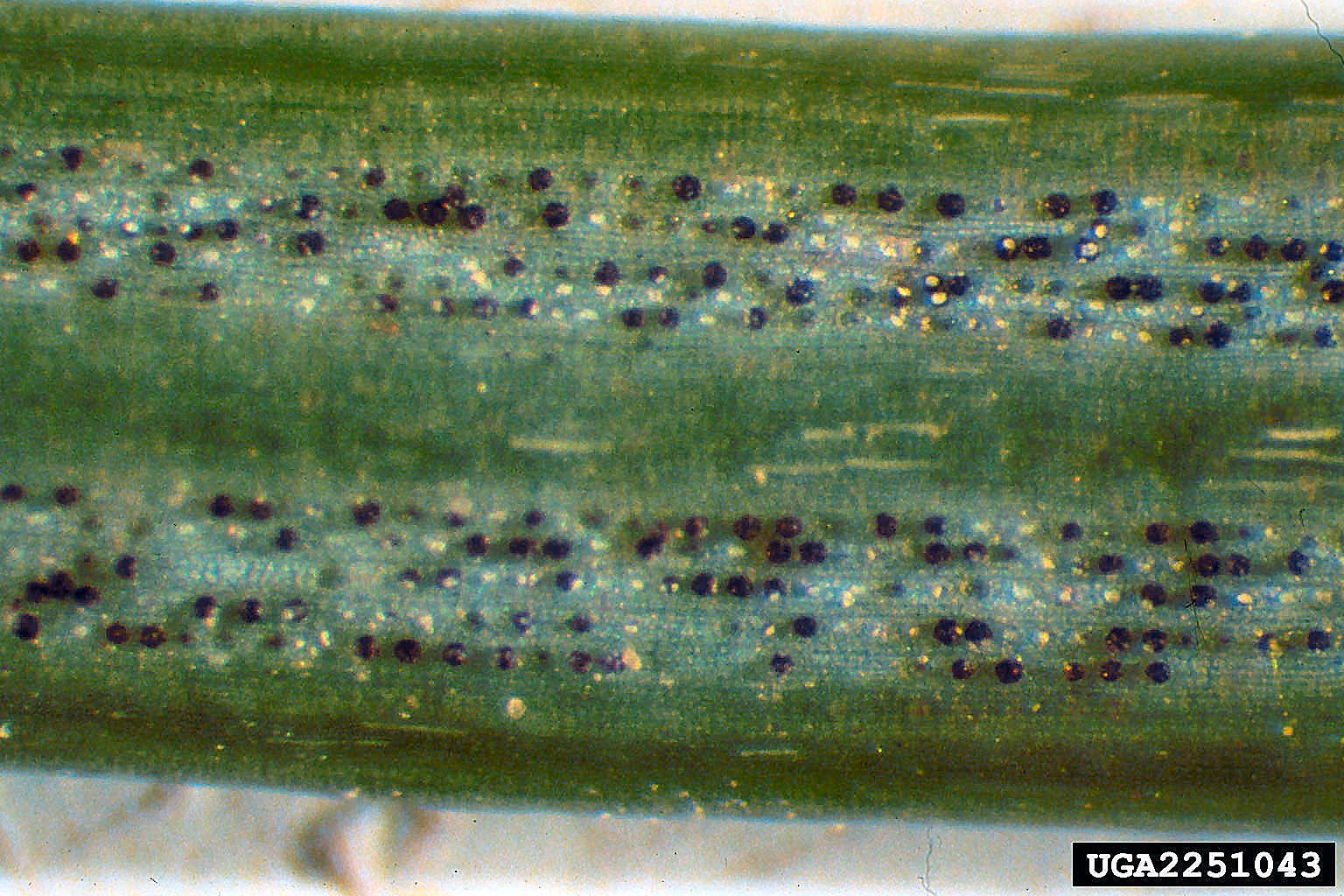
Swiss needle cast fruiting bodies (black spots) of fungus on needle leaf of Douglas fir

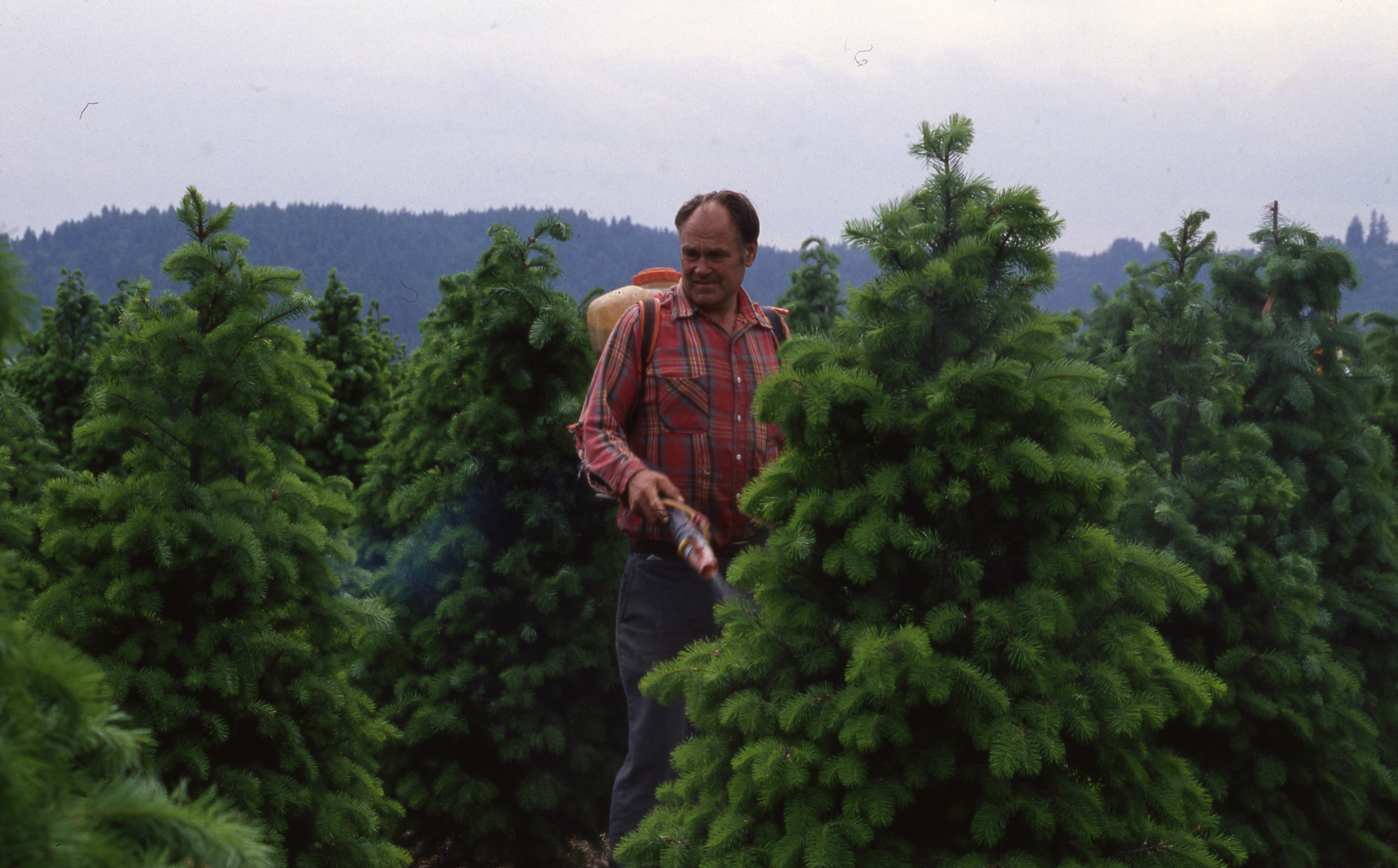
Spraying young trees to control Swiss needle cast, c. 1983

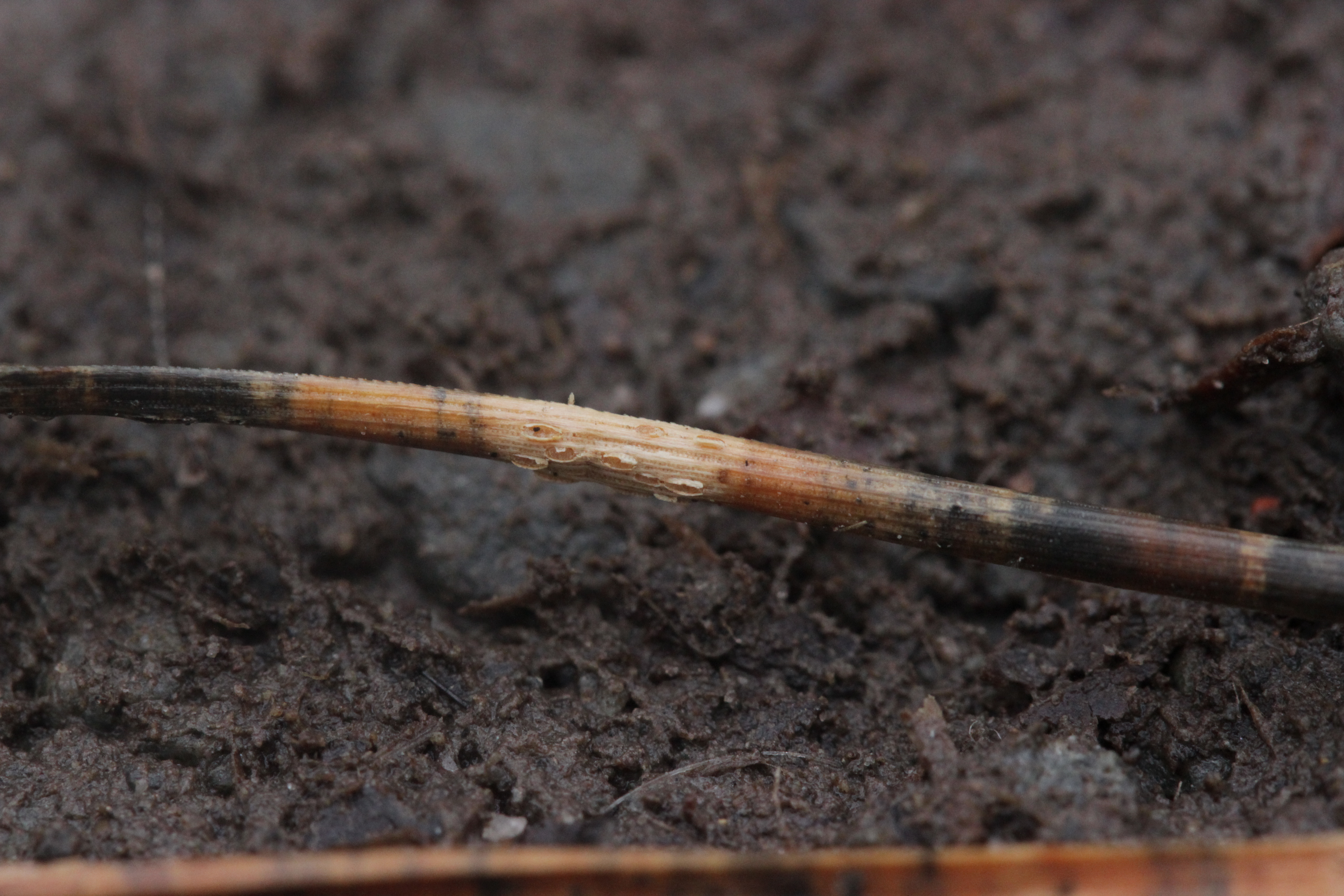
Cast conifer needle infected by Cyclaneusma

=== Caused by oomycetes ===
Red needle cast of conifers including Douglas fir in western North America is caused by an oomycete fungus, Phytophthora pluvialis. Other trees that can be infected include some species of pine, and the western hemlock. The disease has been reported in England and New Zealand.
