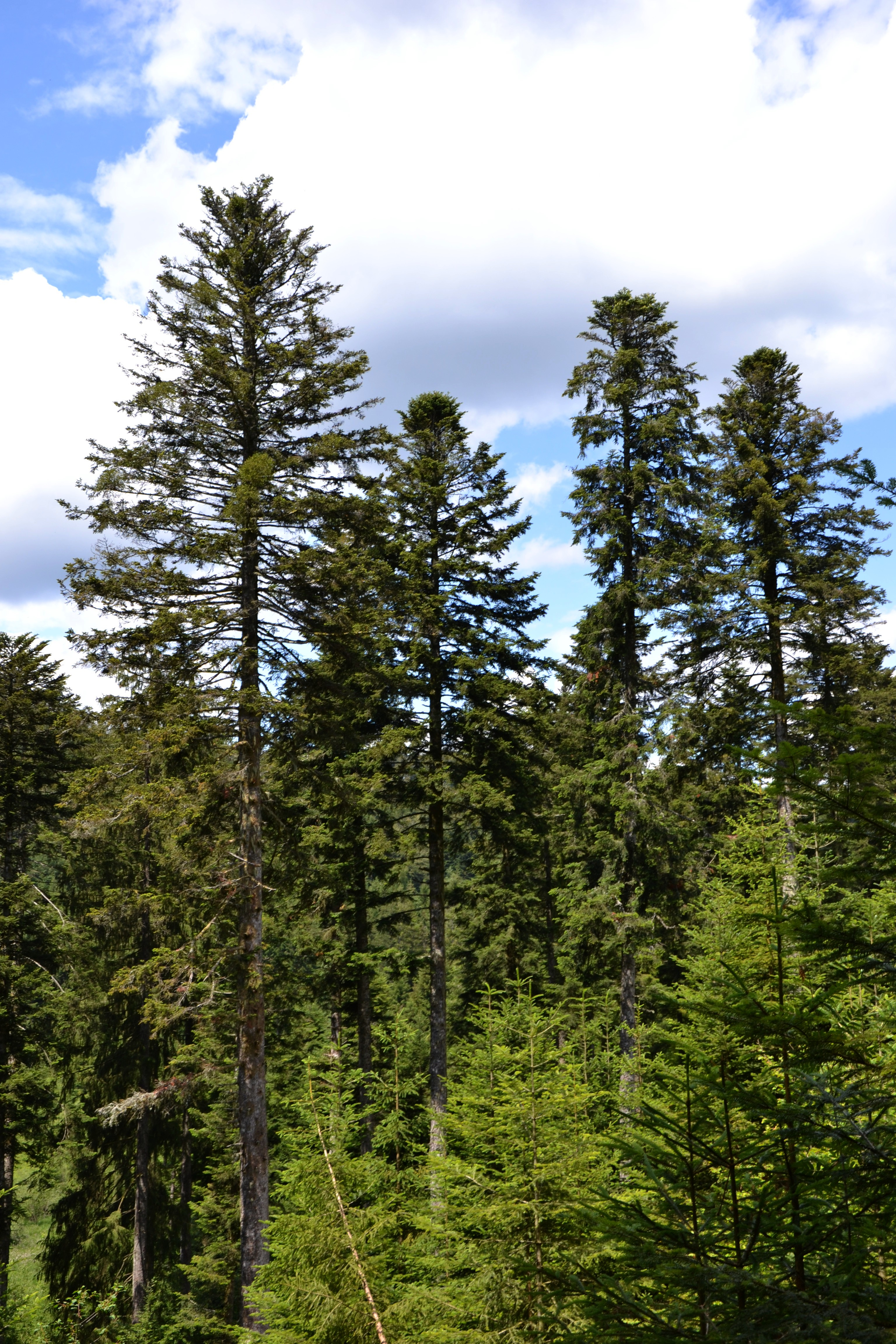
- Large conifer forest of silver fir (Abies alba) at Vosges, Eastern France

Scientific classification
- Kingdom: Plantae
- Clade: Tracheophytes
- Clade: Gymnosperms
- Division: Pinophyta
- Class: Pinopsida

Subclasses, orders, and families
- Cupressidae; Araucariales; Araucariaceae; Podocarpaceae; Cupressales; Sciadopityaceae; Cupressaceae; Cephalotaxaceae; Taxaceae; Pinidae; Pinales; Pinaceae; Gnetidae; Gnetales; Gnetaceae; Welwitschiales; Welwitschiaceae; Ephedrales; Ephedraceae; Palissyales †; Voltziales †; Cheirolepidiaceae †; Arctopityaceae †; Cordaitales †

Synonyms
- Coniferophyta; Coniferae; Pinophytina

= Conifer =

Conifer Temporal range: 307–0 Ma Carboniferous–Present

Group of seed plants

Conifers (/ˈkɒnɪfər/) are a group of vascular plants and a subset of gymnosperms. They are woody trees and shrubs, mostly evergreen with a regular branching pattern, reproducing with male and female cones, usually on the same tree. They are wind-pollinated and the seeds are usually dispersed by the wind. Taxonomically, they make up the division Pinophyta, also known as Coniferae. All extant conifers, except for the gnetophytes, are perennials with secondary growth. There are over 600 living species.

Conifers first appear in the fossil record over 300 million years ago in the Carboniferous. They became dominant land plants in the Mesozoic, until flowering plants took over many ecosystems in the Cretaceous. Many conifers today are relict species, surviving in a small part of their former ranges. Such relicts include Wollemia, known only from a small area of New South Wales, Australia, and Metasequoia glyptostroboides, known from Cretaceous fossils and surviving in a small area of China.

Although the total number of species is relatively small, conifers are ecologically important. They are the dominant plants over the taiga of the Northern Hemisphere. Boreal conifers have multiple adaptations to survive winters, including a conical shape to shed snow, strong tracheid vessels to tolerate ice pressure, and a waxy covering on the needle-shaped leaves to minimize water loss. Many fungi form ectomycorrhizal associations with conifers, while other fungi cause diseases such as needle cast, which is especially harmful to young trees. Conifers are affected by pest insects such as wood-boring longhorn beetles and by bark beetles, which make galleries just under the bark. As of 2025, 94 conifer species are listed as endangered and 30 as critically endangered. Conifers are of great economic value for timber and paper production.

== Description ==
All extant conifers are woody plants; most are trees that bear narrow leaves, often acicular (needle-shaped). An individual conifer produces separate male and female reproductive structures – two distinct types of cone. Pollination is always by wind; the seeds are mostly winged samaras. The trees have a regular branching pattern. Many conifers have distinctly scented resin. The world's tallest and oldest living trees are conifers. The tallest is a coast redwood (Sequoia sempervirens), with a height of 116.07 metres (380.8 ft). Among the smallest conifers is the pygmy pine (Lepidothamnus laxifolius) of New Zealand, which is seldom taller than 30 cm when mature. The oldest non-clonal living tree is a Great Basin bristlecone pine (Pinus longaeva), 4,700 years old. Boreal conifers have multiple adaptations to survive winters, including the tree's conical shape to shed snow, strong tracheid vessels to tolerate ice pressure, and a waxy covering on the needle leaves to minimize water loss.

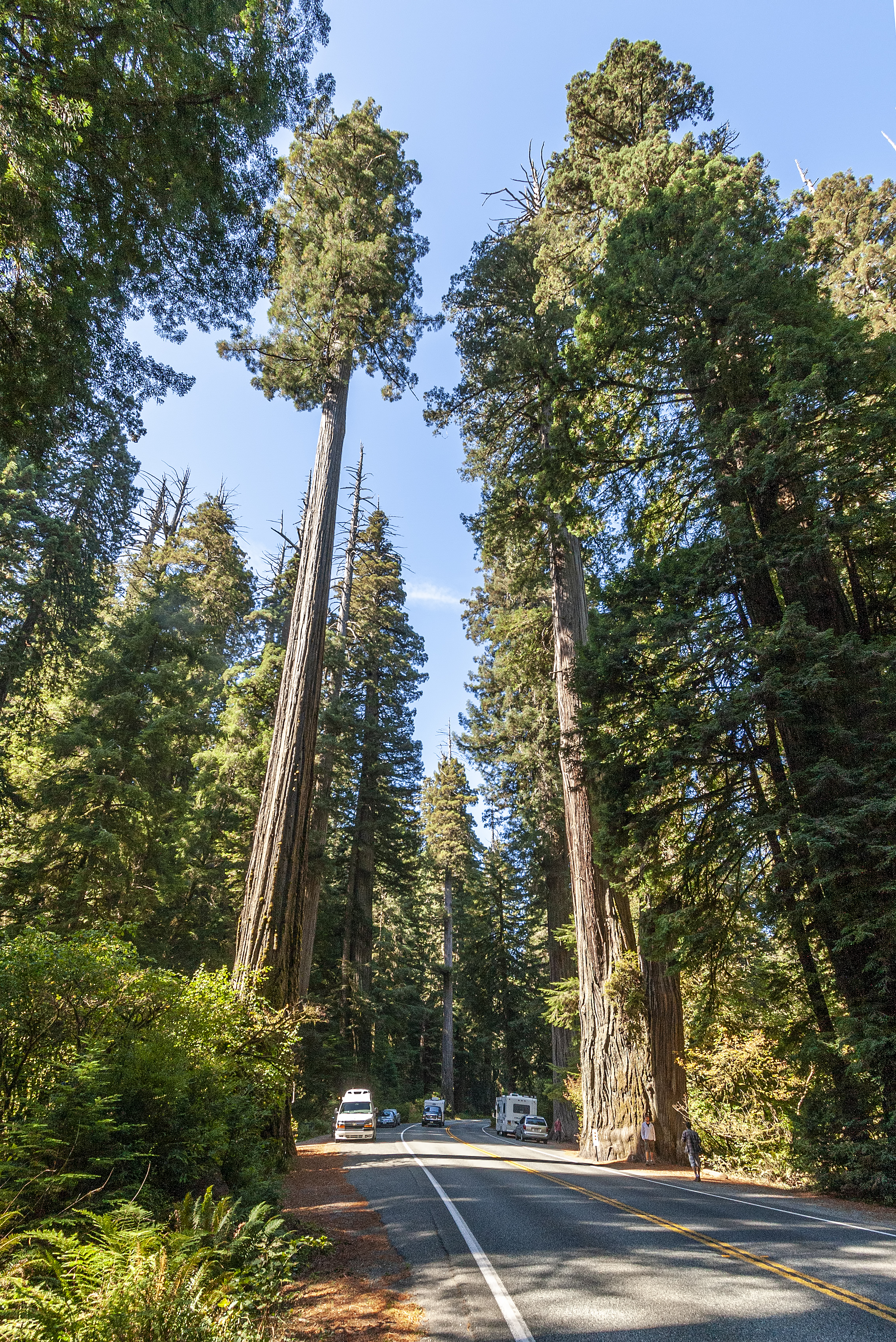
Tallest: Sequoia sempervirens can reach a height of 116.07 metres (380.8 ft).

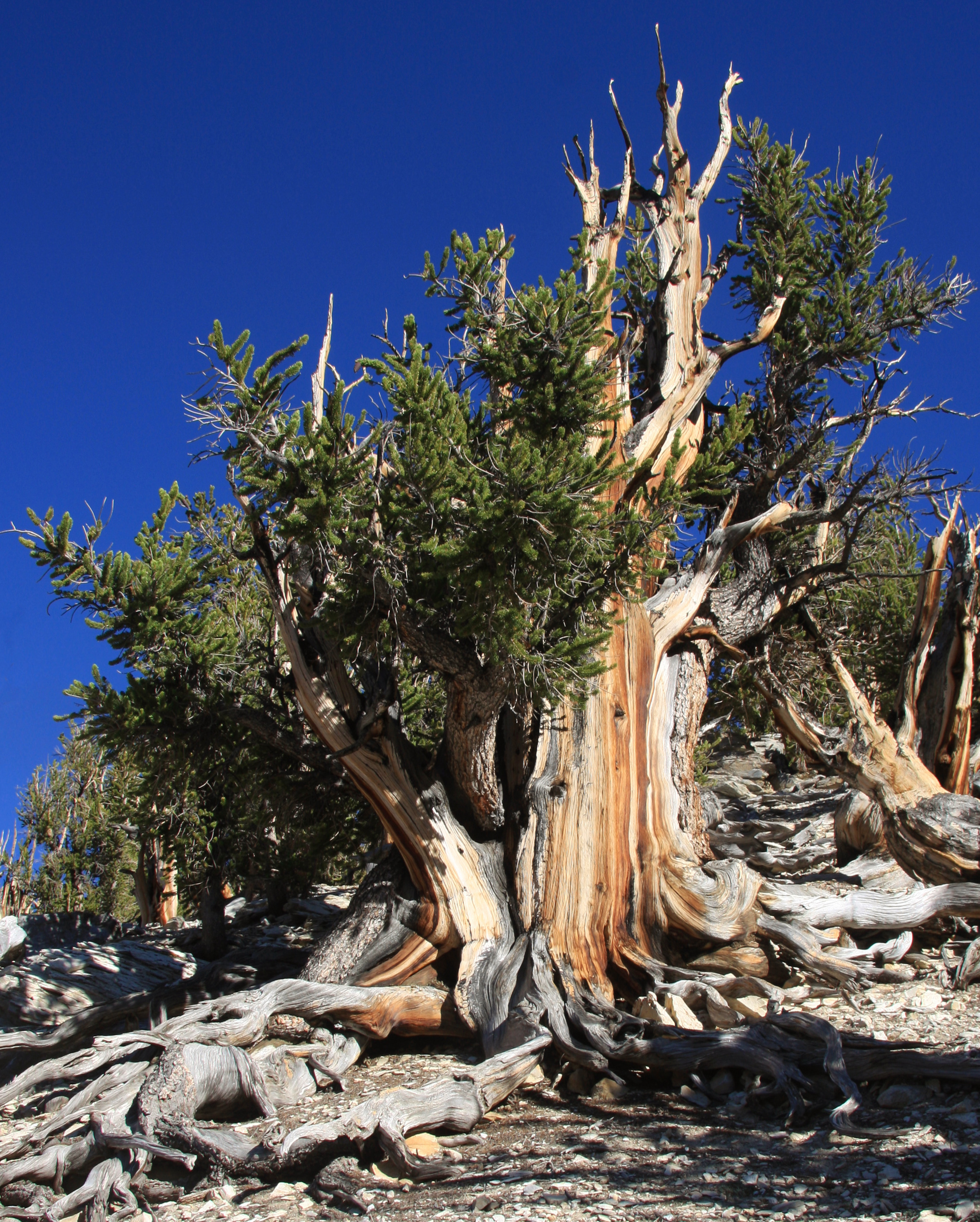
Oldest: Pinus longaeva can reach an age of 4,700 years.

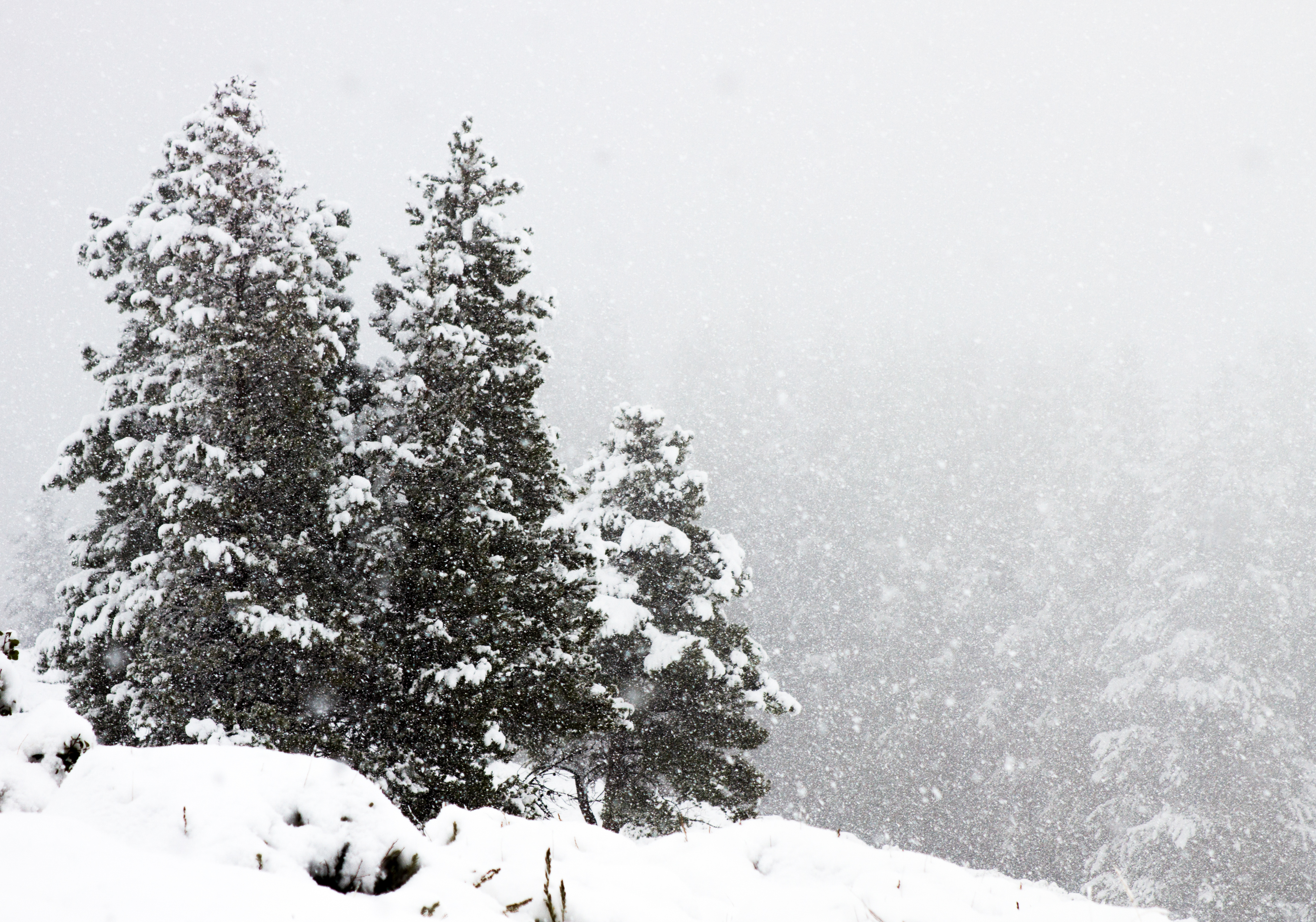
The narrow conical shape of boreal conifers, and their downward-drooping limbs, help them shed snow.

=== Foliage ===
Most conifers are evergreens, retaining functional foliage throughout the year. In many species such as pines, firs, and cedars, the leaves are long, thin and needle-like. Others like cypresses have flat, triangular scale-like leaves. In the majority of conifers, the leaves are arranged spirally, the exceptions being most of Cupressaceae and one genus in Podocarpaceae, where they are arranged in decussate (crossing) opposite pairs or whorls of 3 or 4. In many species with spirally arranged leaves, such as Abies grandis, the leaf bases are twisted to present the leaves in a flat plane for maximum light absorption. Leaf size varies from 2 mm in many scale-leaved species, up to 600 mm (24 in) long in the needles of some pines (e.g. longleaf pine, ponderosa pine). The stomata are in lines or patches on the leaves and can be closed when it is very dry or cold. The leaves are often dark green in color, which may help absorb a maximum of energy from weak sunshine at high latitudes or under forest canopy shade. Conifers from lower latitudes with high sunlight levels (e.g. Turkish pine Pinus brutia) often have yellower-green leaves, while others (e.g. blue spruce, Picea pungens) may develop blue or silvery leaves reflect ultraviolet light. In the great majority of genera the leaves remain on the plant for several (2–40) years before falling, but five genera (Larix, Pseudolarix, Glyptostrobus, Metasequoia and Taxodium) are deciduous, shedding their leaves in autumn. The seedlings of some conifers, including pines, have a distinct juvenile foliage period where the leaves are different from the typical adult leaves.

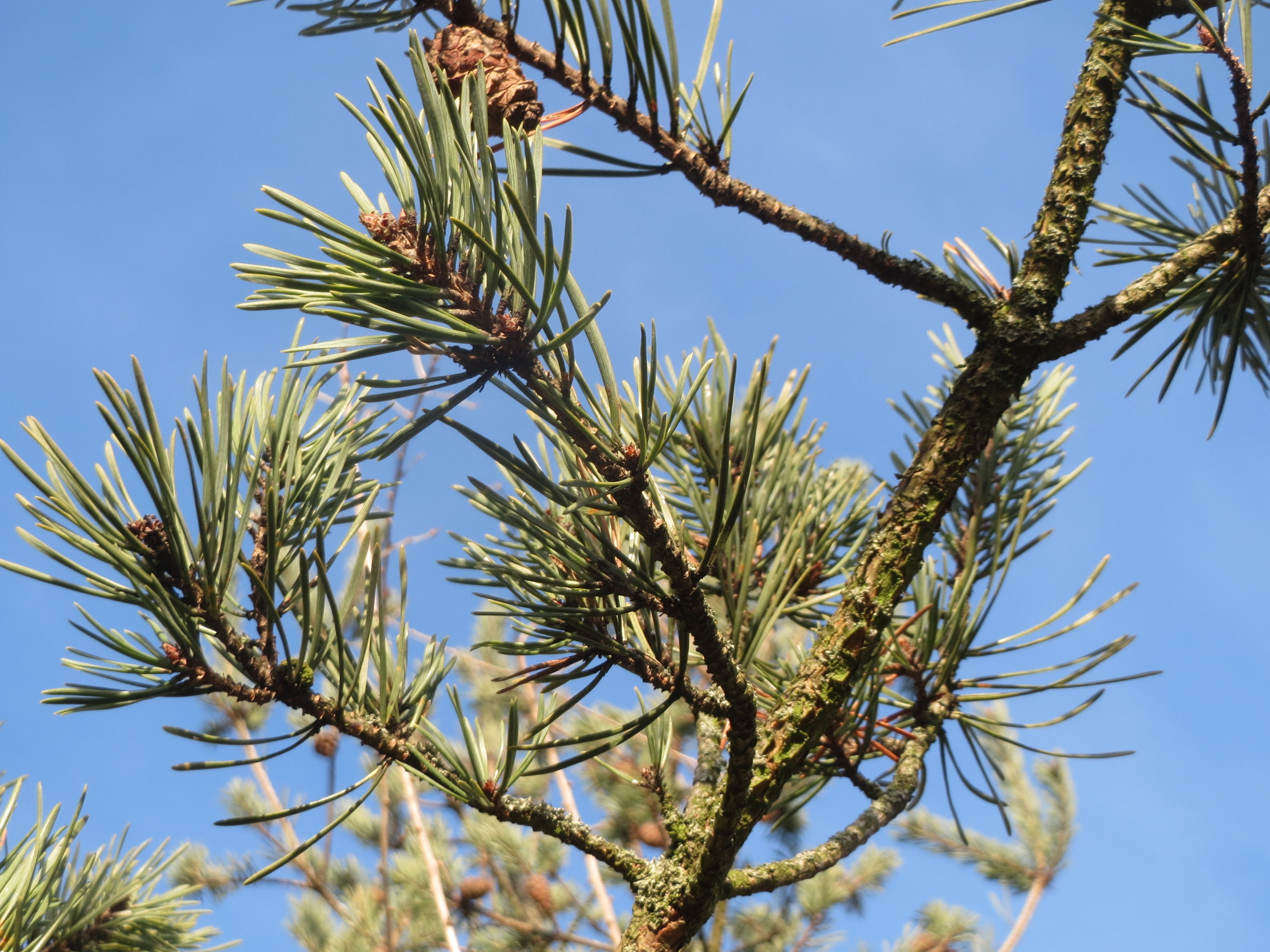
Pinaceae: needle-like leaves of Scots pine (Pinus sylvestris)

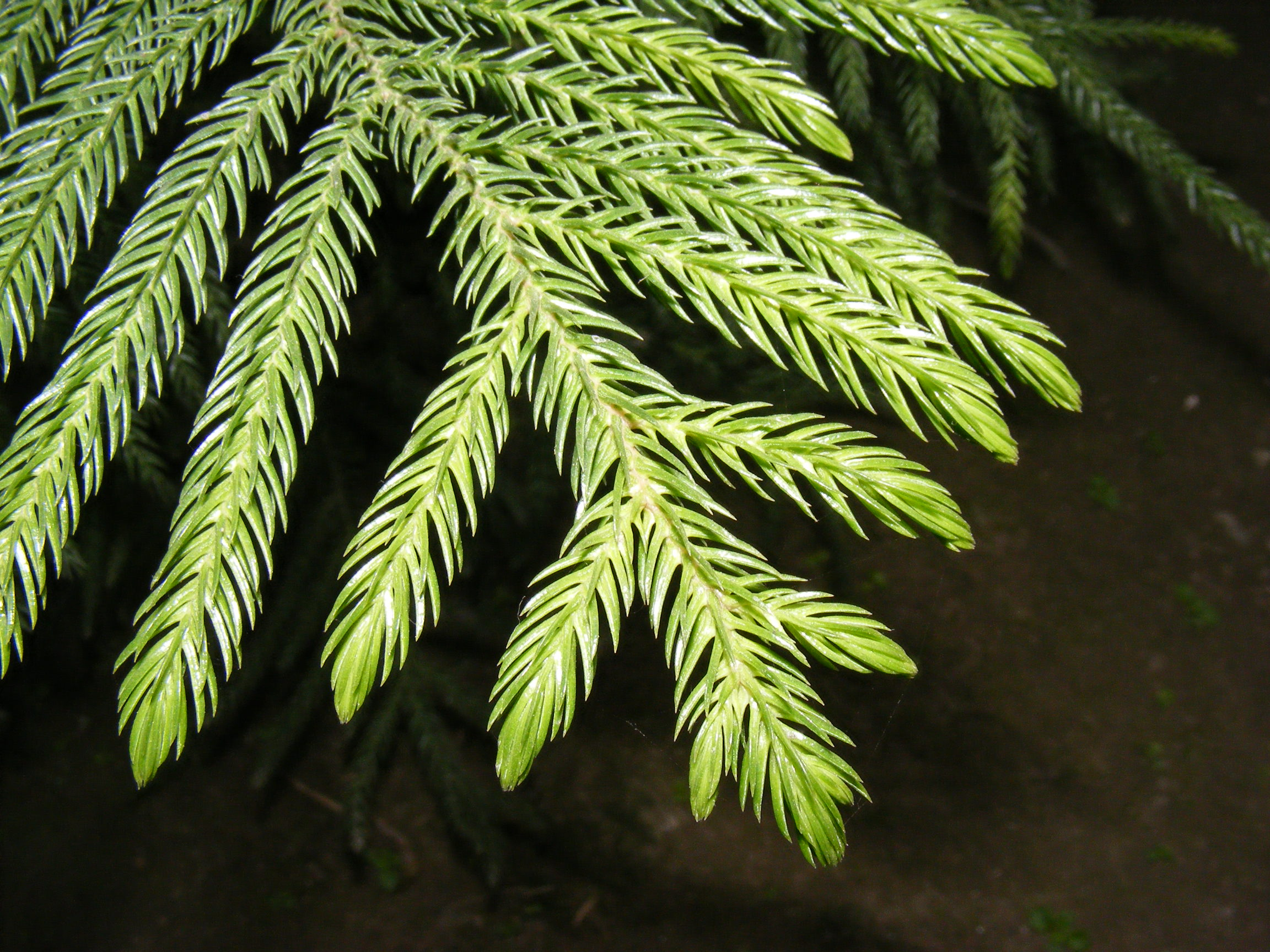
Araucariaceae: awl-like leaves of Cook pine (Araucaria columnaris)

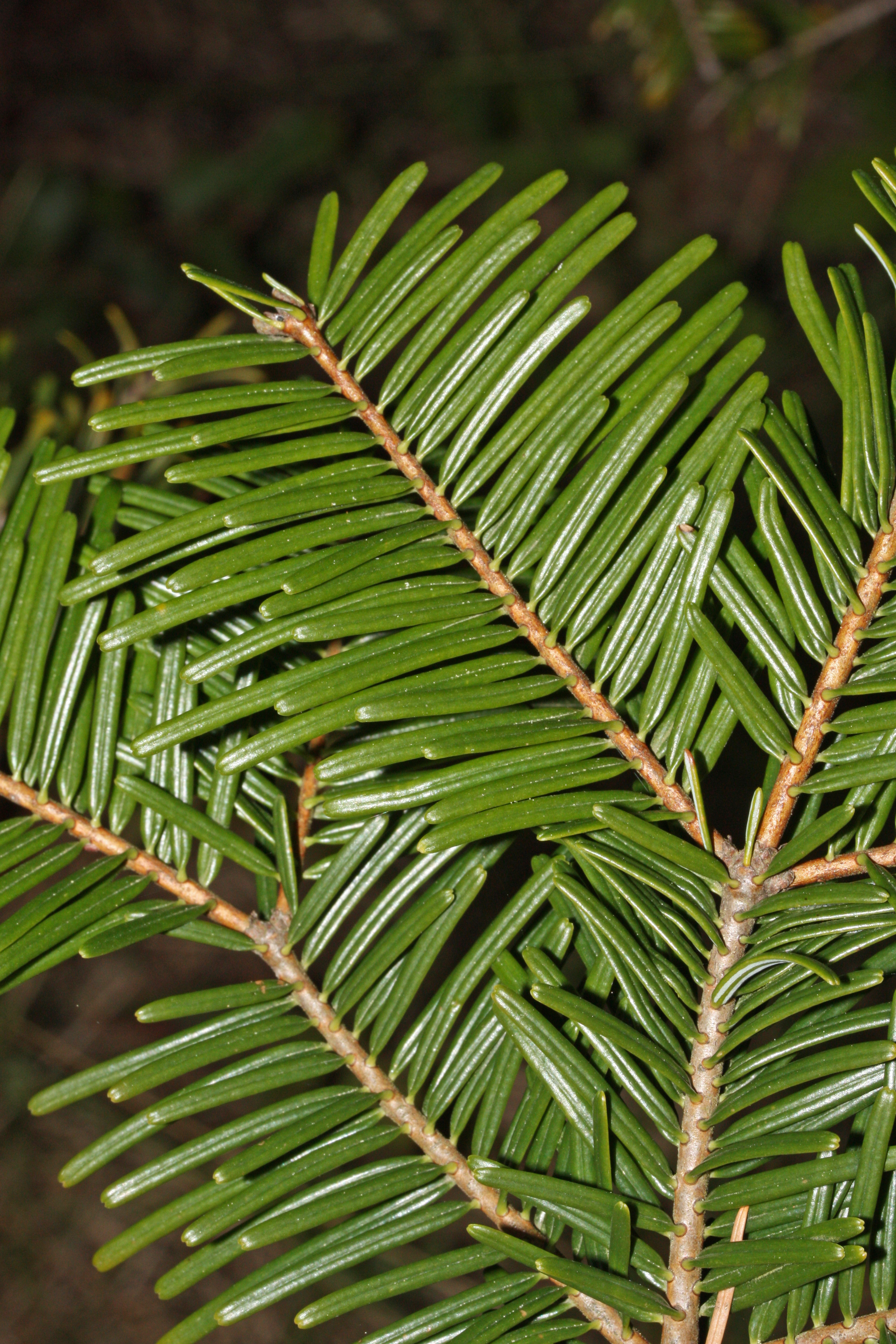
In Abies grandis and many other species with spirally arranged leaves, each leaf is twisted near its base to maximize light absorption.

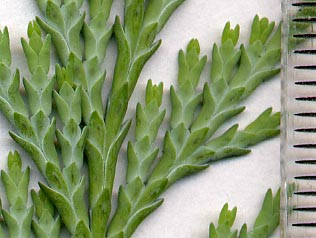
Cupressaceae: scale-like leaves of Lawson's cypress (Chamaecyparis lawsoniana); ruler in mm

=== Wood ===
The microscopic structure of conifer wood (xylem) is homogeneous, and consists of two types of cells: parenchyma, which have an oval or polyhedral shape, and strongly elongated tracheids. Tracheids make up more than 90% of timber volume.

Conifers produce growth rings, normally gently curved in their outline, but in Taxus, Juniperus, and Cupressaceae are undulating. The tracheids of earlywood formed at the beginning of a growing season have large radial sizes and smaller, thinner cell walls. Then, the first tracheids of the transition zone are formed, where the radial size of cells and the thickness of their cell walls changes considerably. Finally, latewood tracheids are formed, with small radial sizes and greater cell wall thickness. This is the basic pattern of the internal cell structure of conifer tree rings. Frost rings have been observed in Cupressaceae.

Conifer wood contains medullary rays, primarily composed of parenchymal cells, and involved in radial gas exchange, as a conduit for storage of water and nutrients, and as a pathway for diffusing heartwood substances. The latewood in particular also contains resin canals. These are surrounded by specialised epithelial cells that secrete resin into the canal. Radial and axial resin canals are interconnected throughout the wood.

Conifers secrete oleoresin, a composite of turpentine and rosin. When an insect or a fungus attacks, oleoresin flows into the wound. It traps invading insects and blocks fungi. The rosin hardens and seals the wound, protecting against damage. During wet weather, the Gitxsan harvest conifer rosin for use as fire starters.

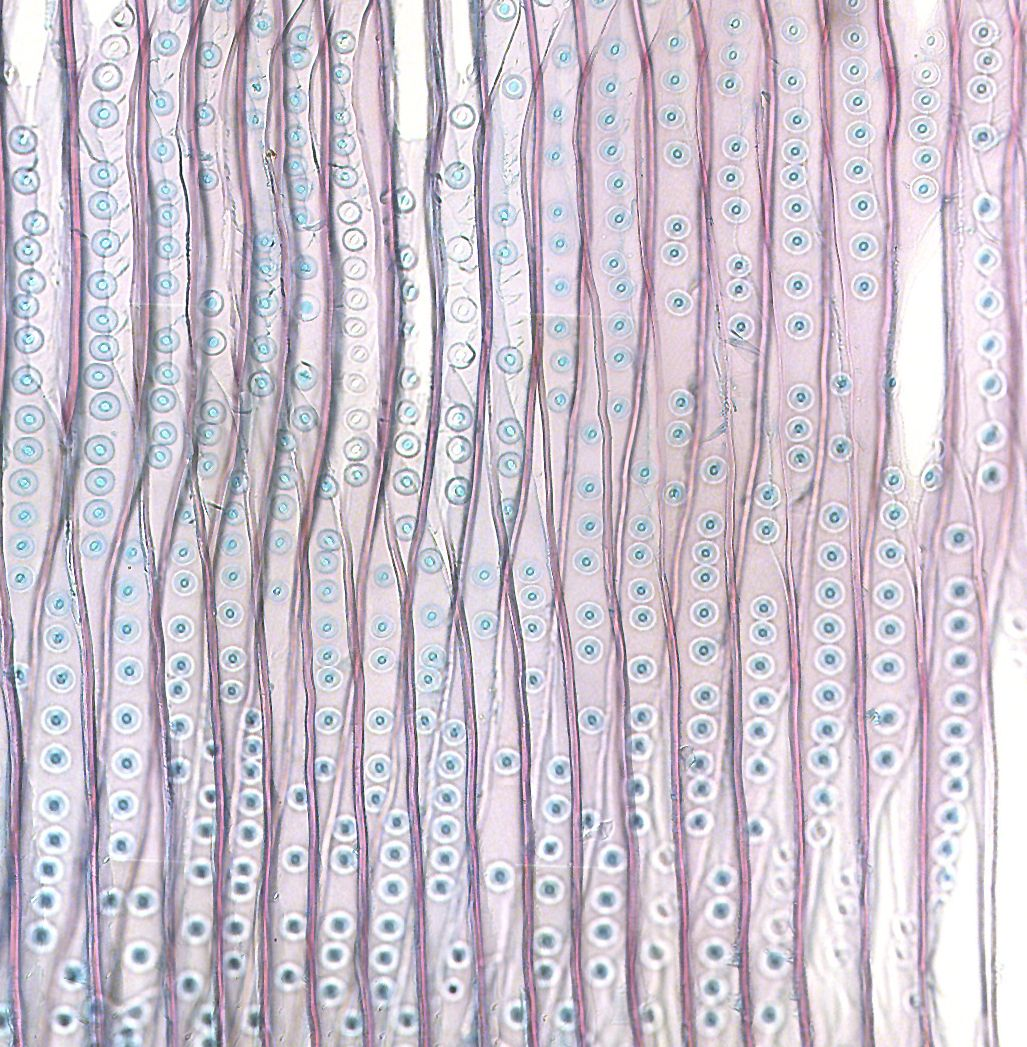
Vertical (tangential) section of Abies concolor wood (xylem), showing tracheids as long overlapping tubes. Perforation pits (small circles) allow water to move from one tracheid to the next.

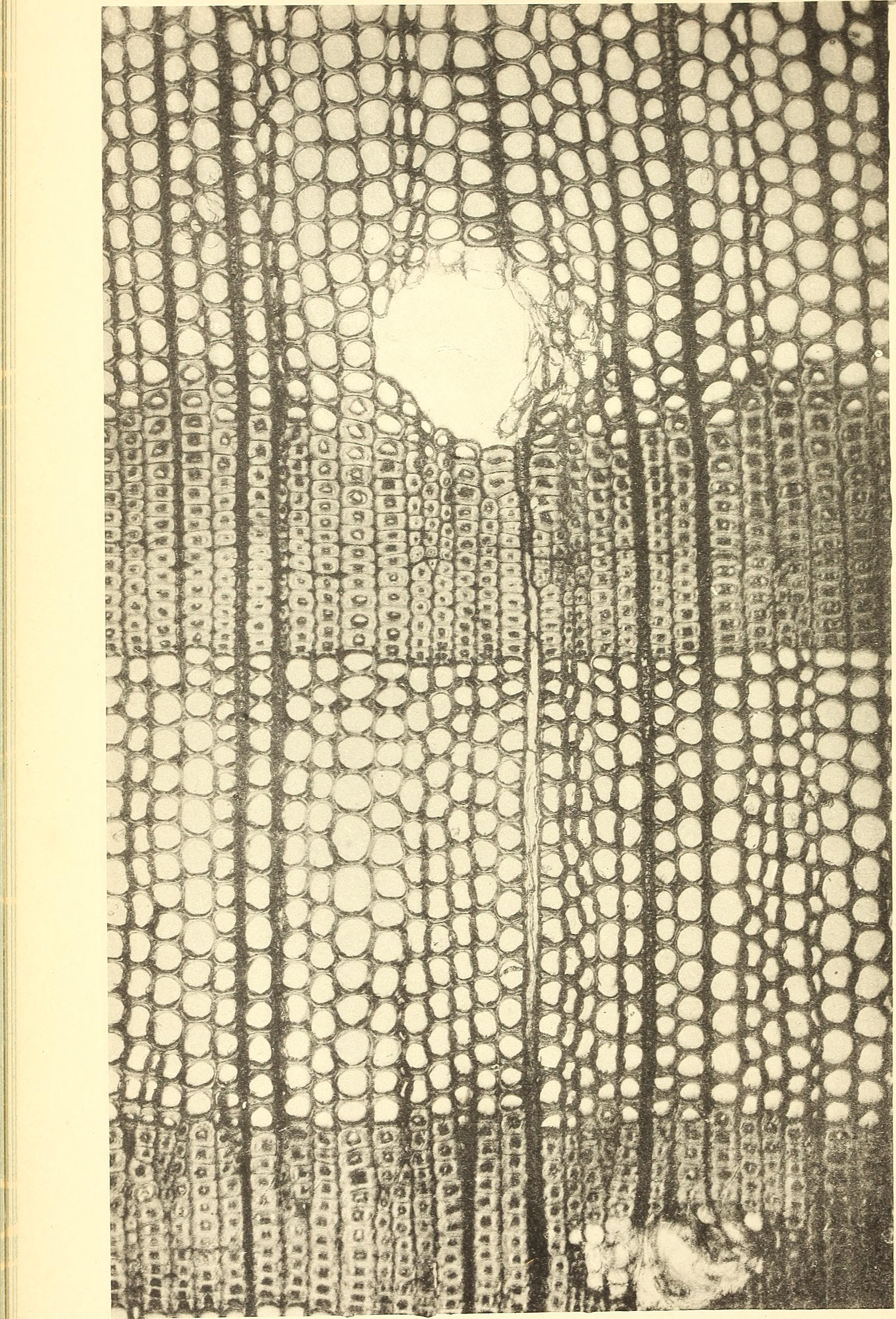
Transverse section of wood, cutting across the tracheid tubes, showing tree rings of fast (big cells, earlywood) and slow seasonal growth

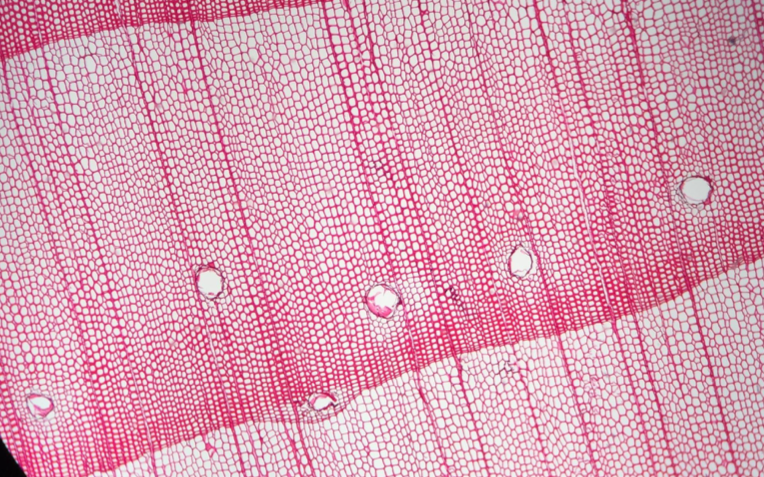
Resin canals appear as white circles in a section of pine wood.

=== Roots ===
Saplings initially develop a primary taproot, while mature conifers develop an extensive network of coarse roots for mechanical support. Structural integrity and failure is strongly influenced by the radial symmetry of the root system, spoke-like root systems are more stable than asymmetrical supports, especially in shallower soils.

Conifers also develop a near-surface fine root system, concentrated on lateral branches arising from the course roots, which are colonized by mycorrhizal fungi that enhance water and mineral absorption.

=== Reproduction ===
Conifers produce their seeds inside a protective cone called a strobilus. Most species are monoecious, with male and female cones on the same tree. All conifers are wind-pollinated. In conifers such as pines, the cones are woody, and when mature the scales usually spread open allowing the seeds, which are often winged, to fall out and be dispersed by the wind. In others such as firs and cedars, the cones disintegrate to release the seeds.

Some conifers produce nut-like seeds, such as pine nuts, which are dispersed by birds, in particular, nutcrackers, and jays, which break up the cones. In fire-adapted pines such as Pinus radiata, the seeds may be stored in closed cones for many years, being released only when a fire opens the cones. In families such as Taxaceae, the cone scales are much modified as edible arils, resembling berries. These are eaten by birds, which then pass the seeds in their droppings.

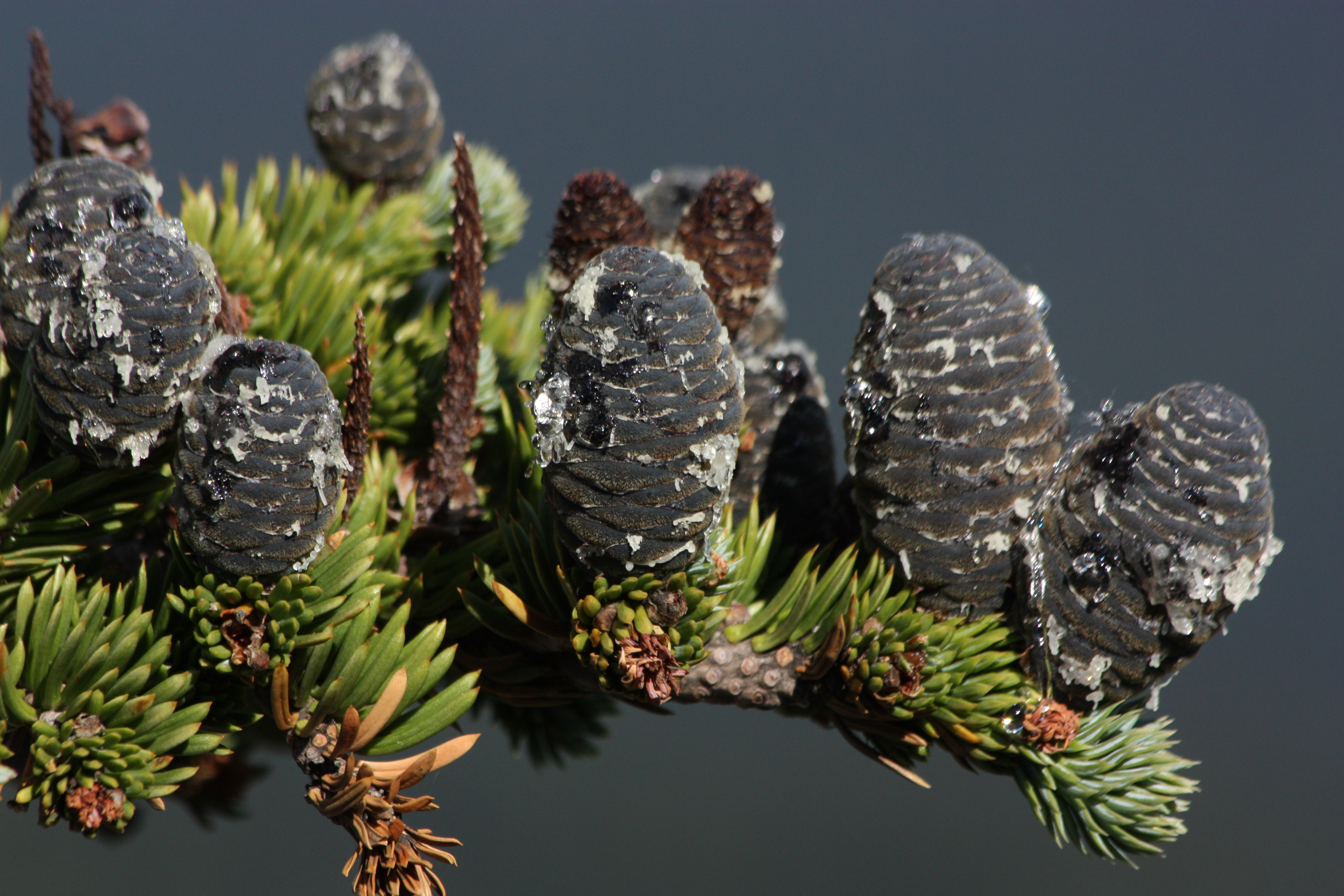
Pinaceae: unopened female cones of subalpine fir (Abies lasiocarpa)

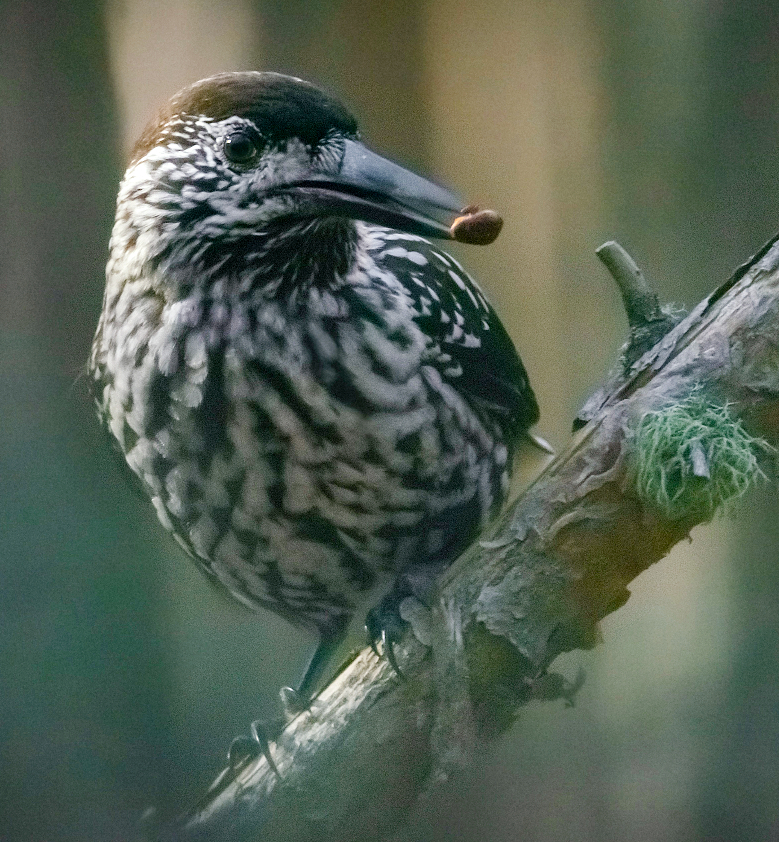
Northern nutcracker with nut of Pinus sibirica

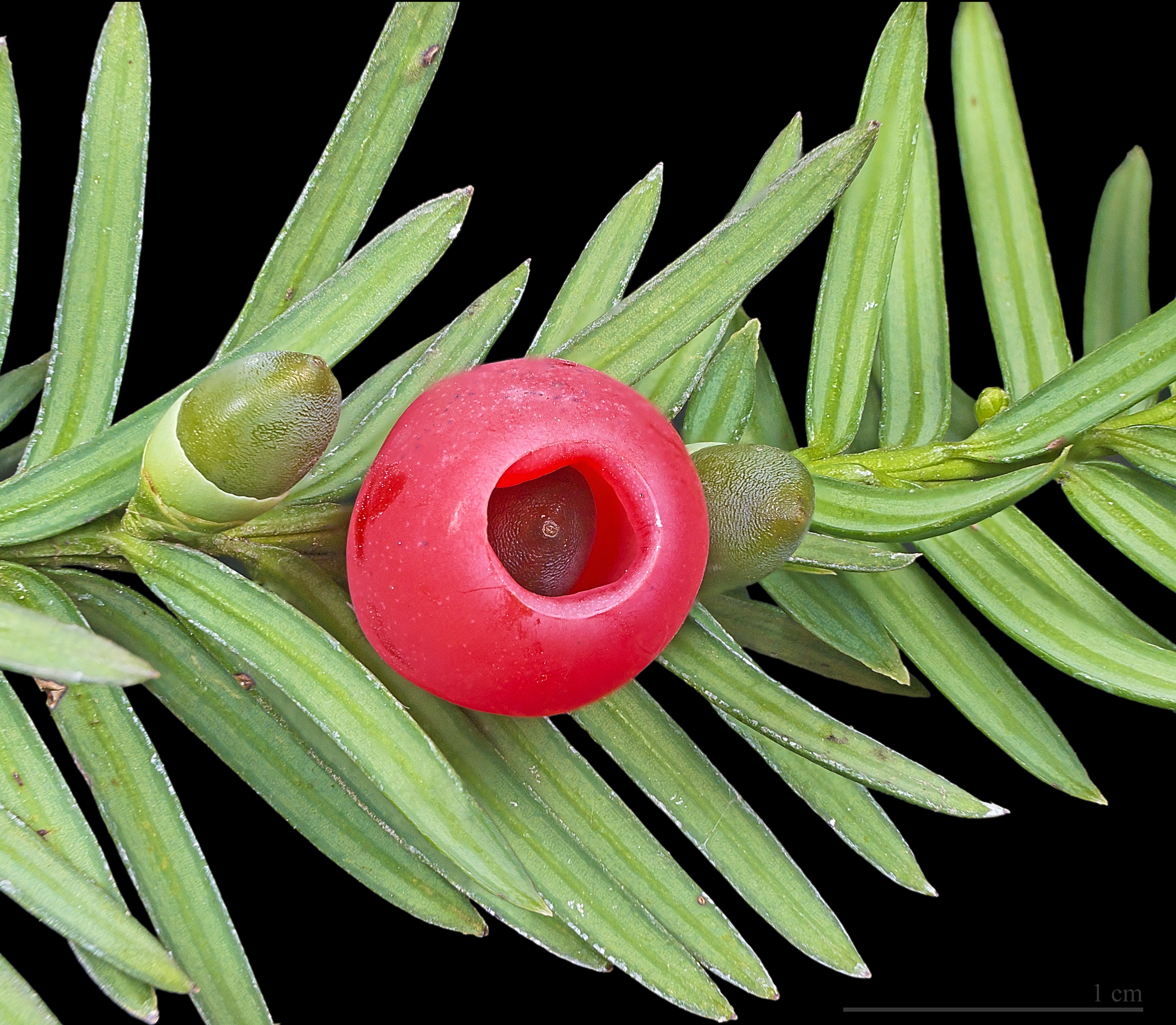
Taxaceae: the fleshy aril that surrounds each seed in the European yew is a highly modified seed cone scale.

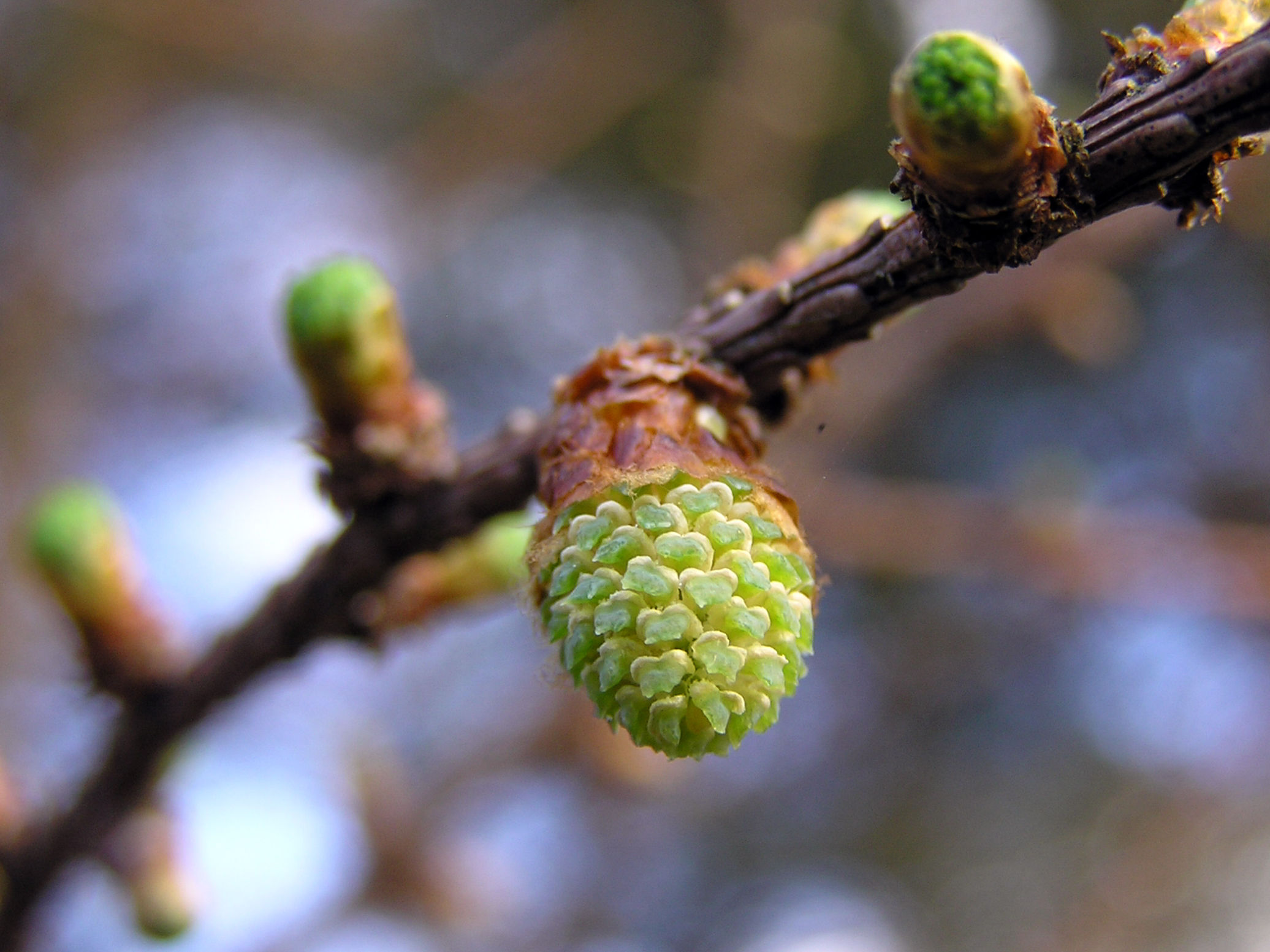
Pinaceae: pollen cone of a Japanese larch (Larix kaempferi)

=== Life cycle ===
Life cycle of a pine tree

Conifers are heterosporous, generating two different types of spores: male microspores and female megaspores. These spores develop on separate male and female sporophylls on separate male and female cones, usually on the same tree.

In the male cones, microspores are produced from microsporocytes by meiosis. The microspores develop into pollen grains, which contain the male (micro)gametophytes. Large amounts of pollen are released and carried by the wind. Some pollen grains land on female cones, pollinating them. The generative cell in the pollen grain divides into two haploid sperm cells by mitosis, leading to the development of the pollen tube. At fertilization, one of the sperm cells unites its haploid nucleus with the haploid nucleus of an egg cell.

The female cone develops two ovules, each of which contains haploid megaspores. A megasporocyte is divided by meiosis in each ovule. The female gametophytes grow to produce two or more haploid eggs. The fertilized egg, the (diploid) zygote, gives rise to the embryo, and a seed is produced. The female cone then opens, releasing the seeds which grow into seedlings. Some seedlings survive to grow into trees.

Conifer reproduction is synchronous with seasonal changes in temperate zones. Reproductive development slows to a halt during each winter season and then resumes each spring. The male strobilus development is completed in a single year. Conifers have one of three reproductive cycles that differ in the time to complete female strobilus development from initiation to seed maturation. The cycle is one year in genera such as Abies, Picea, Cedrus, and Tsuga; two years in most pine species and in Sequoiadendron; and three years in three pine species including Pinus pinea. All three types have a long gap between pollination and fertilization.

== Evolution ==
=== Fossil history ===
The earliest conifers appear in the fossil record during the Late Carboniferous (Pennsylvanian) over 300 million years ago. Conifers are thought to be most closely related to the Cordaitales, a group of extinct Carboniferous-Permian trees and clambering plants whose reproductive structures had some similarities to those of conifers. The most primitive conifers belong to the paraphyletic assemblage of "walchian conifers", which were small trees, and probably originated in dry upland habitats. The range of conifers expanded during the Early Permian (Cisuralian) to lowlands due to increasing aridity. Walchian conifers were gradually replaced by more advanced voltzialean or "transition" conifers. Conifers were largely unaffected by the Permian–Triassic extinction event, and were dominant land plants of the Mesozoic era. Modern groups of conifers emerged from the Voltziales during the Late Permian through Jurassic. Conifers underwent a major decline in the Late Cretaceous corresponding to the explosive adaptive radiation of flowering plants.

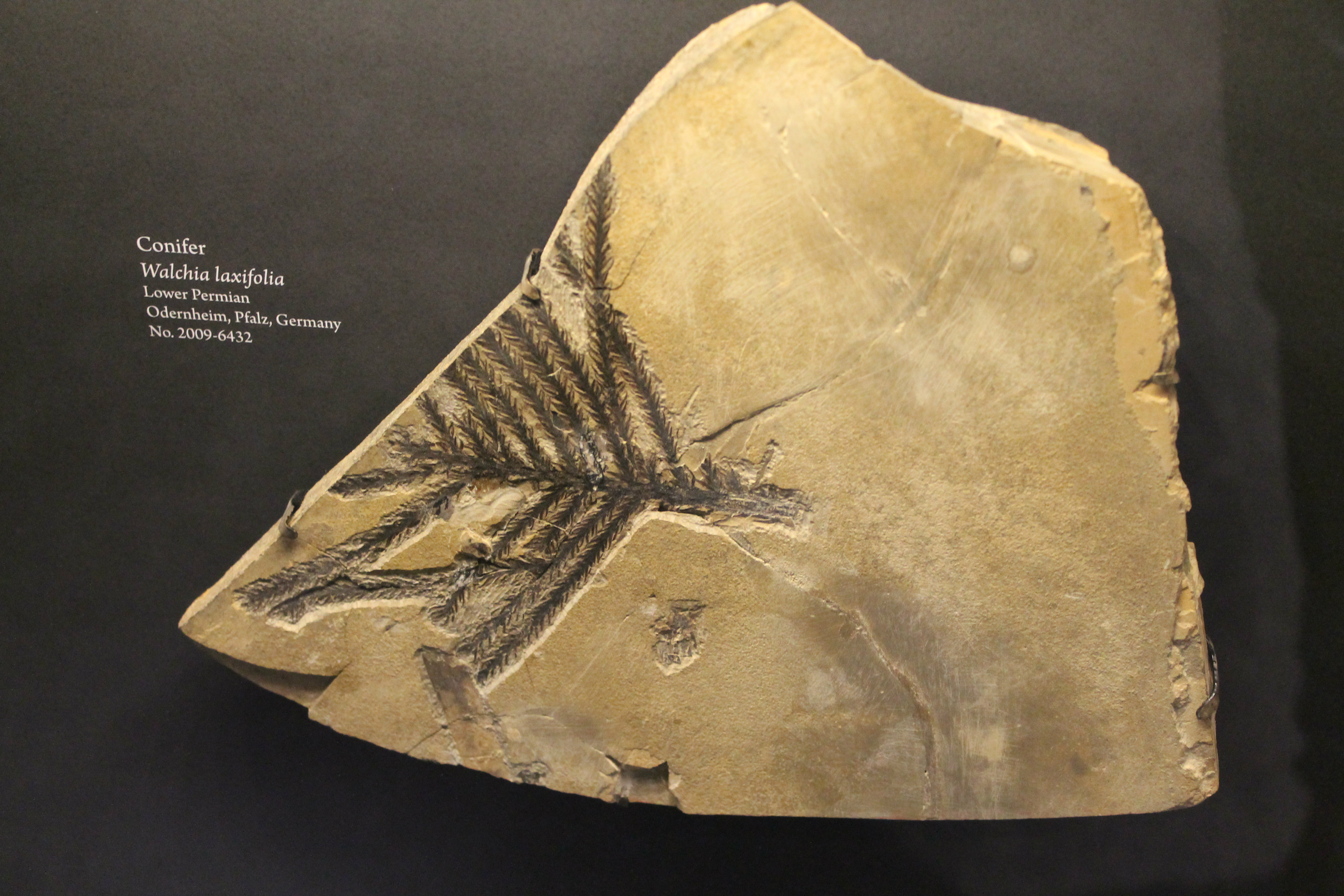
Voltziales: Walchia laxifolia foliage, Early Permian, Germany

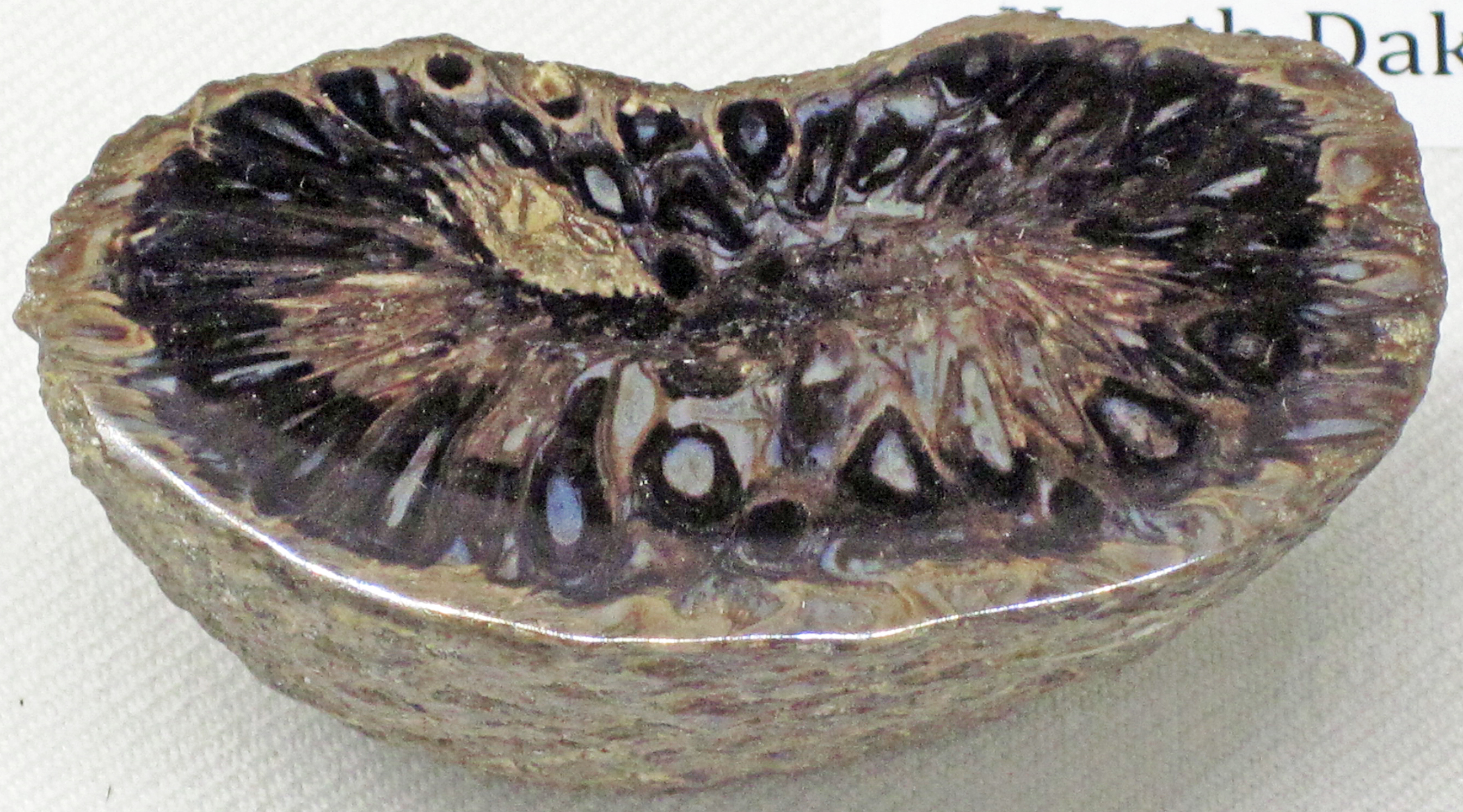
Araucaria cone, Jurassic, Argentina

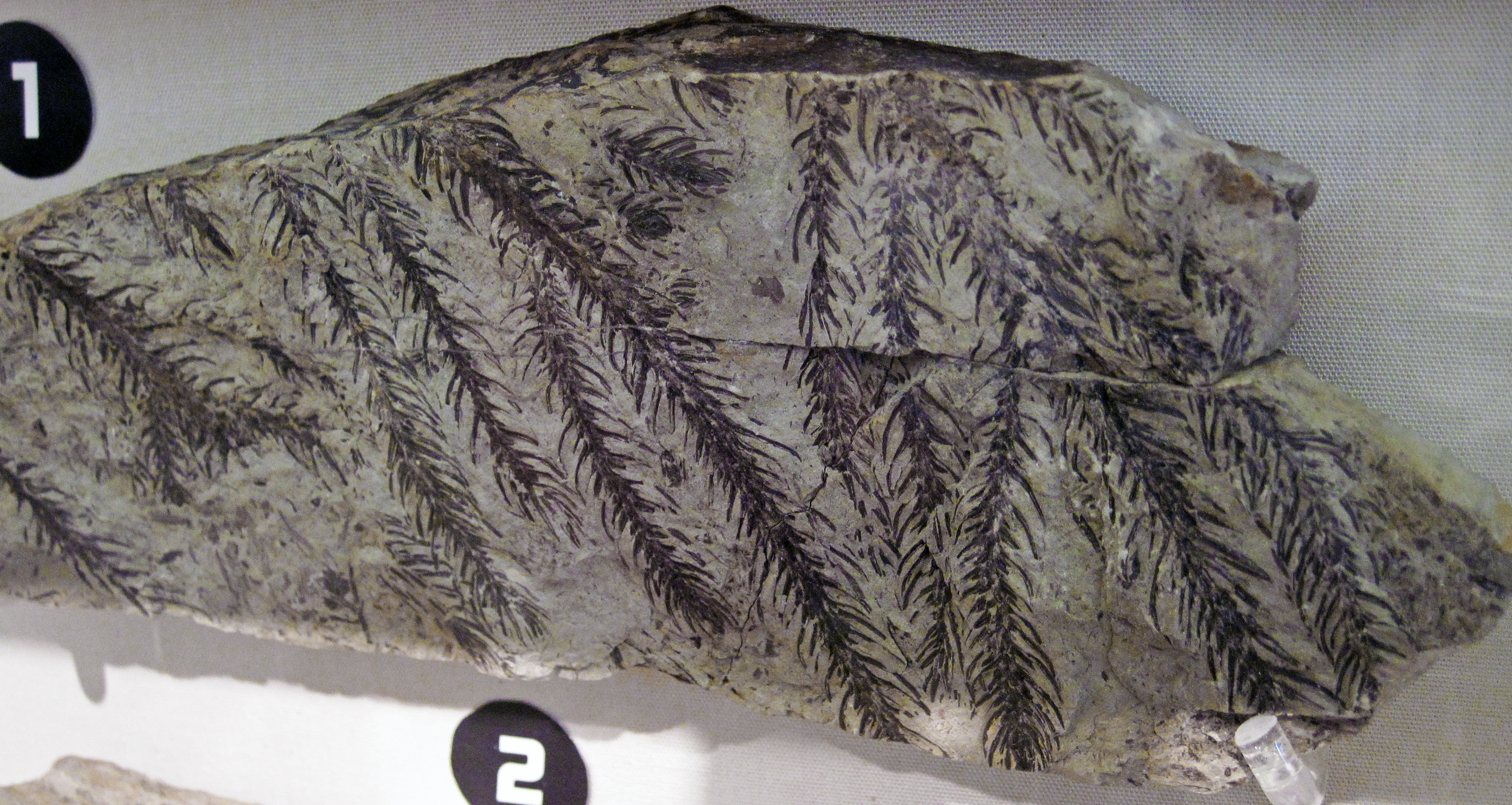
Elatides foliage, Late Cretaceous, N. America

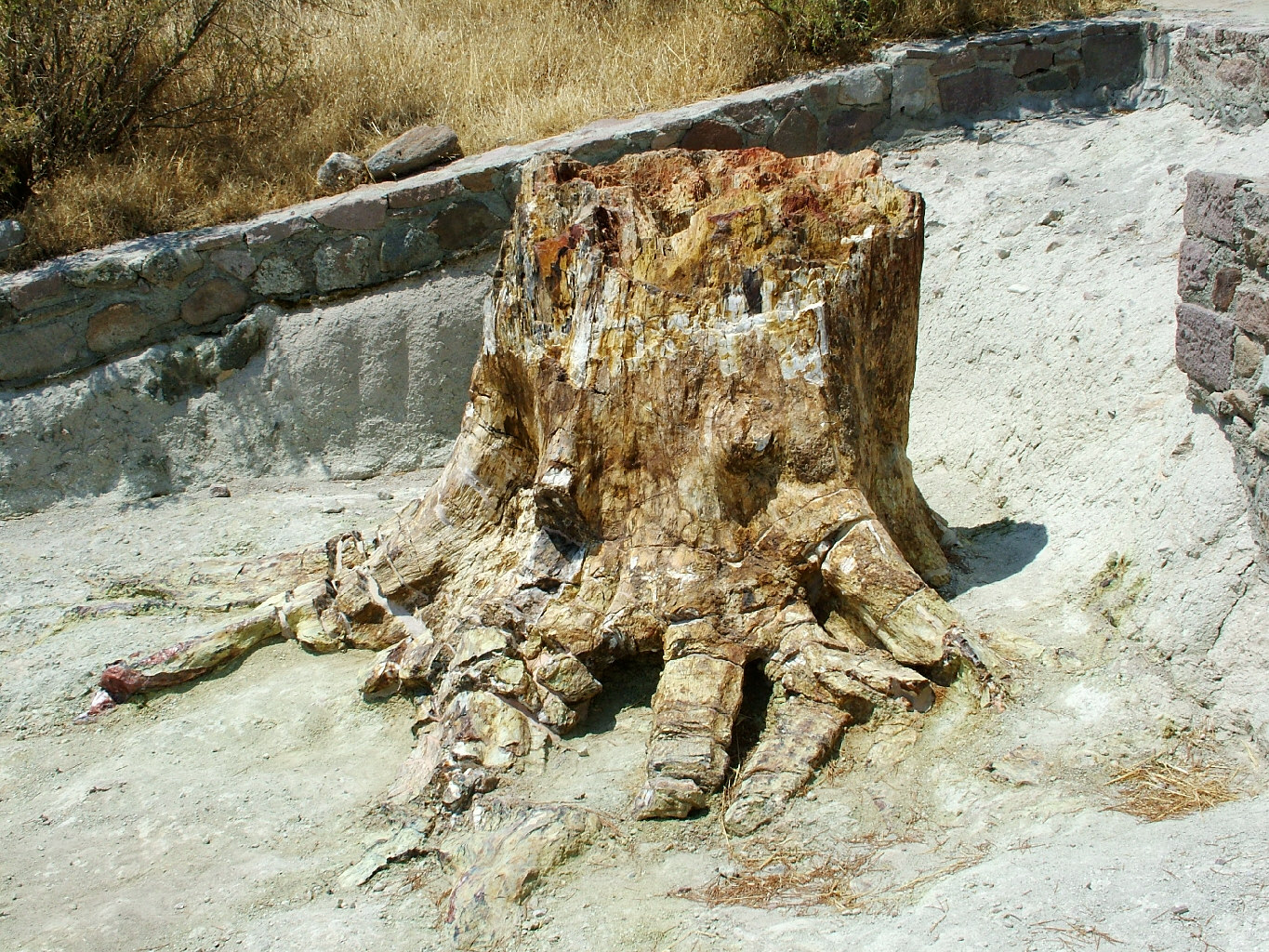
Base of conifer trunk with roots, Early Miocene, Lesbos, Greece

=== Relict species ===
Several extant conifers have relict taxon status, surviving in small areas or in very small numbers where they once may have been common and widespread. One such is Wollemia nobilis, discovered in 1994 in some narrow, steep-sided, sandstone gorges in Australia. The wild population consisted of under 60 adult trees with essentially no genetic variability, implying a genetic bottleneck some thousands of years ago. The extant gnetophytes consist of three relict genera, namely Ephedra, Gnetum, and Welwitschia. Fossils definitely of the group date back to the Late Jurassic, with many species in the Cretaceous. Conifers as a whole, too, declined markedly after the angiosperms (flowering plants) diversified during the Cretaceous, coming to dominate most terrestrial ecosystems. Many conifer species became extinct, leaving 30 out of 80 genera with just one extant species, and 11 more with just two or three species. The popular phrase "living fossils" could, the Dutch botanist Aljos Farjon states, fittingly be applied to many of these. Thus, Metasequoia glyptostroboides, the dawn redwood, is known from fossils of Late Cretaceous and Miocene age, and was found also as an extant tree with a small relict range in China.

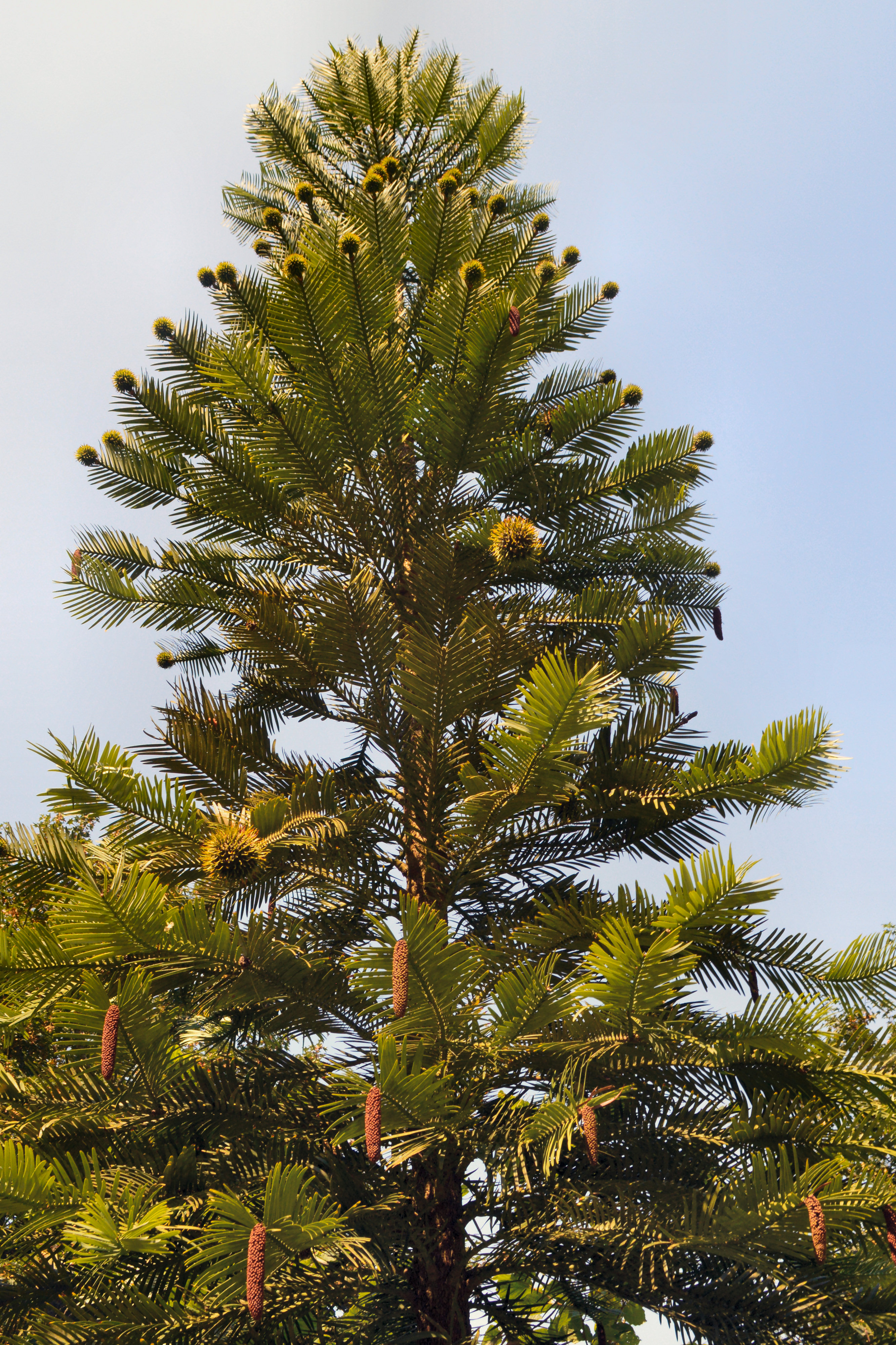
Wollemia nobilis is a relict taxon known only from a small area in Wollemi National Park in New South Wales, Australia.

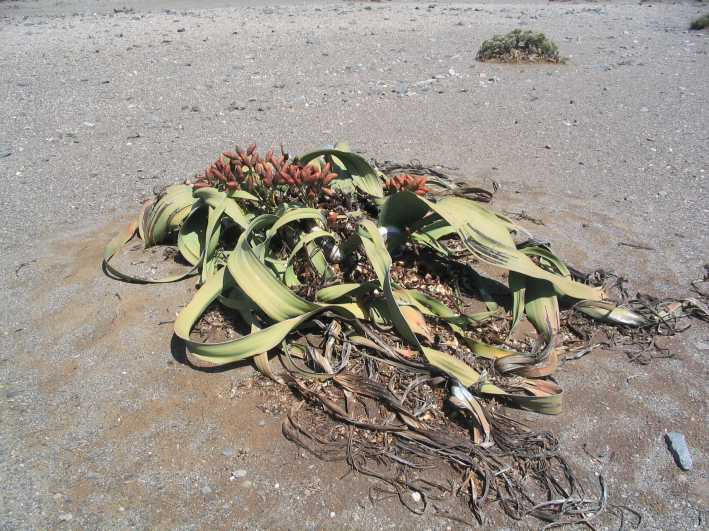
Welwitschia mirabilis is one of the gnetophytes, all relict taxa very unlike other conifers.

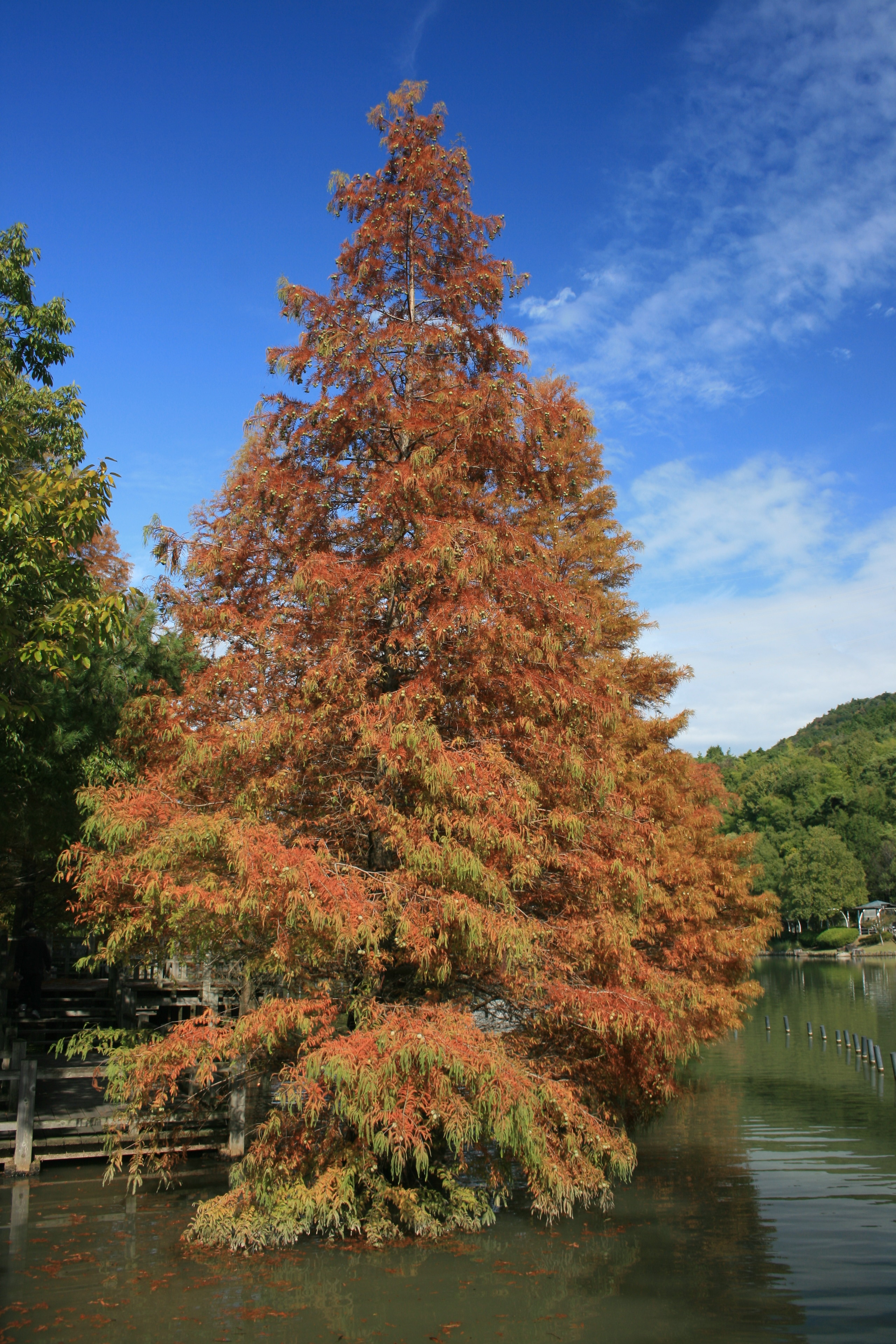
Metasequoia glyptostroboides survives in a small part of China, and is known from fossils from the Late Cretaceous onwards.

=== External phylogeny ===
The cladogram summarizes the group's external phylogeny. The conifers are gymnosperms, sister to a clade consisting of the ginkgos and cycads.

- Gymnosperms
  - - Ginkgoidae
    - Cycadidae
  - Conifers

=== Internal phylogeny ===
The Gnetophyta, with their distinct appearances, were long viewed as outside the conifer group, phylogenomic studies now place the gnetophytes within the conifer clade as the sister group of Pinaceae (the gnepine hypothesis). Under this interpretation, many morphological features shared by gnetophytes and angiosperms are considered convergent or independently derived rather than ancestral. More recent classifications, generally place Cephalotaxus within Taxaceae and recognize only six extant conifer families.

- Pinophyta (Coniferae)
  - - Pinaceae pine family
    - Gnetophyta (3 extant genera)
  - - - Araucariaceae monkey puzzle family
      - Podocarpaceae podocarps
    - - Sciadopityaceae umbrella pines
      - - Cupressaceae cypress family
        - Taxaceae yew family (including Cephalotaxus)

=== Taxonomy ===
The name conifer, meaning 'cone-bearing', derives from Latin conus, 'cone', and ferre, 'to bear'. As recently as 1999, the botanist Aljos Farjon wrote that while the Coniferae had up to the early 20th century been considered "a natural family", comparable to the Rosaceae, he doubted that the conifers or the gymnosperms formed natural groups (clades). By 2016, the conifers were recognized as a clade, with six families (not including the gnetophytes), 65–70 genera, and over 600 living species (c. 2002). Depending on interpretation, Cephalotaxaceae may or may not be included within Taxaceae, while some authors recognize Phyllocladaceae as distinct from Podocarpaceae. The family Taxodiaceae is here included in the family Cupressaceae.

== Distribution and ecology ==
Conifers are the dominant plants over the taiga forest of the Northern Hemisphere, forming the world's largest terrestrial biome. The taiga consists mainly of larches, pines, and spruces. Larch is the most common tree in Russia, and by volume of timber, easily the most abundant tree genus worldwide. The larch species Larix gmelinii is the world's most northern-ranging tree species, at 75° north in the Taymyr Peninsula. Conifers are widespread also in southern Europe, Western Asia, the Himalayas, Southeast Asia, and Japan. Conifers are not confined to the Northern Hemisphere: around 200 conifer species live only in the tropics, and others live in Australasia, Africa (including Madagascar), and Central and South America. Species richness decreases with latitude; a northern country like Canada has just 9 species, whereas Mexico has 43, and the tropical island of New Caledonia has 42 endemic species.

Conifers are adapted to acidic, nutrient-poor soils, low temperatures, and seasonal water limitations. Their ecology is strongly shaped by subsurface interactions within the rhizosphere. In these environments, conifers associate with ectomycorrhizal fungi, forming symbioses that help them to acquire nutrients. Alongside fungi, plant growth–promoting rhizobacteria are key members of the rhizosphere microbial community, contributing to nutrient cycling and plant health.

Since conifers cannot regrow their leaves rapidly like hardwoods, leaf diseases can seriously damage coniferous plantations, especially dense stands of young trees. Needle cast diseases, often caused by ascomycete fungi in the Rhytismataceae family, result in leaf fall. Another ascomycete, Rhizosphaera (Sphaeropsidales), causes severe defoliation and shoot blight, for instance in spruces.

At least 20 species of roundheaded wood-boring longhorn beetles (Cerambycidae) feed on the wood of spruces, firs, and hemlocks. Bark beetles (Scolytinae, in the Curculionidae) are destructive pests of commercial forestry; major pests of spruce and other conifers include Ips typographus in Eurasia and Dendroctonus rufipennis in North America.

The basidiomycete fungus Boletus pinophilus is among the fungi that form an ectomycorrhizal association with conifers; in its case, with pines such as Pinus sylvestris.

Some conifers introduced for forestry including Pinus radiata have become invasive species in New Zealand, South Africa, and Australia.

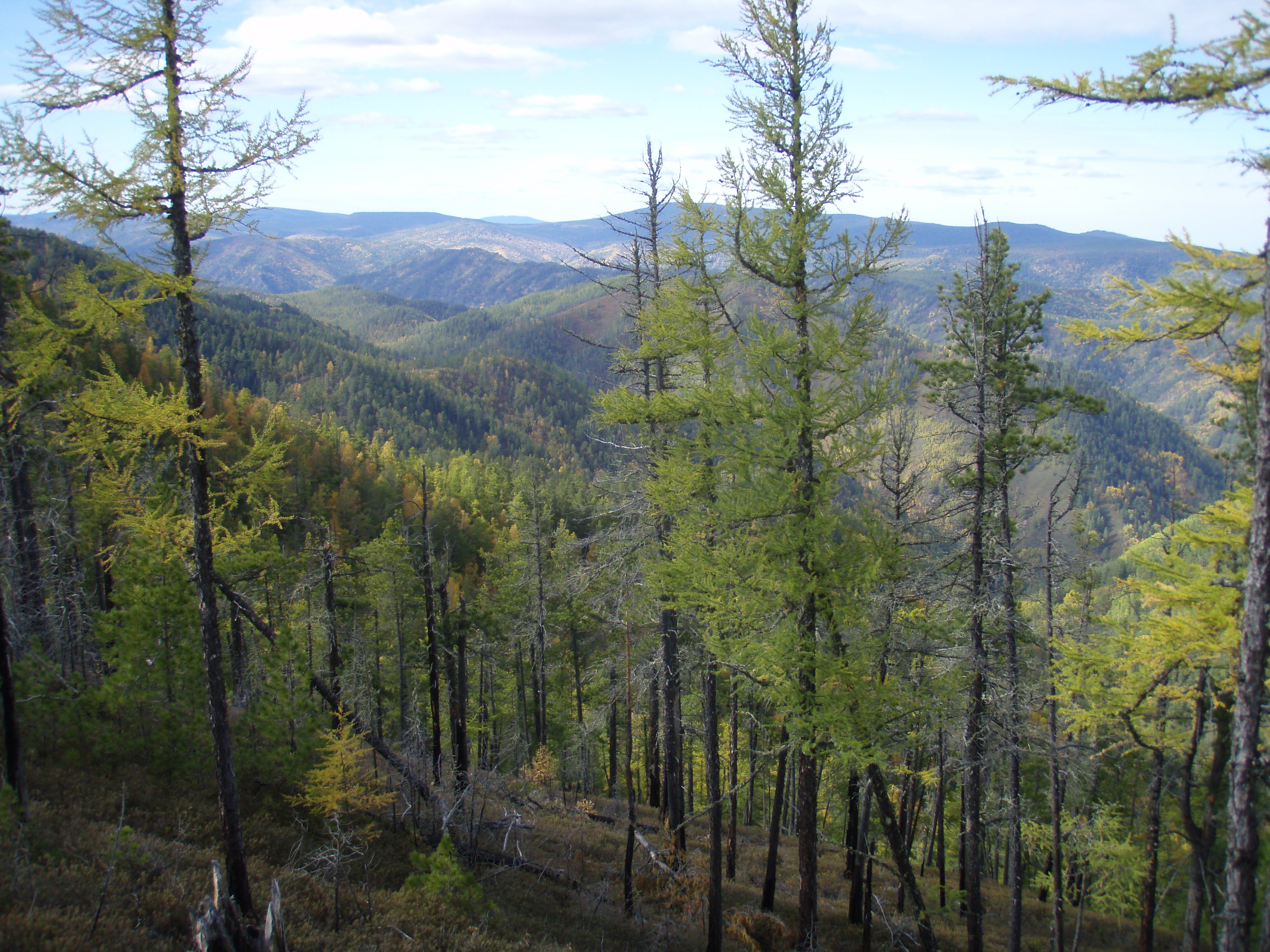
Taiga coniferous forest, mostly larches, pines, and spruces, covers a large area of Siberia (pictured) and Canada.

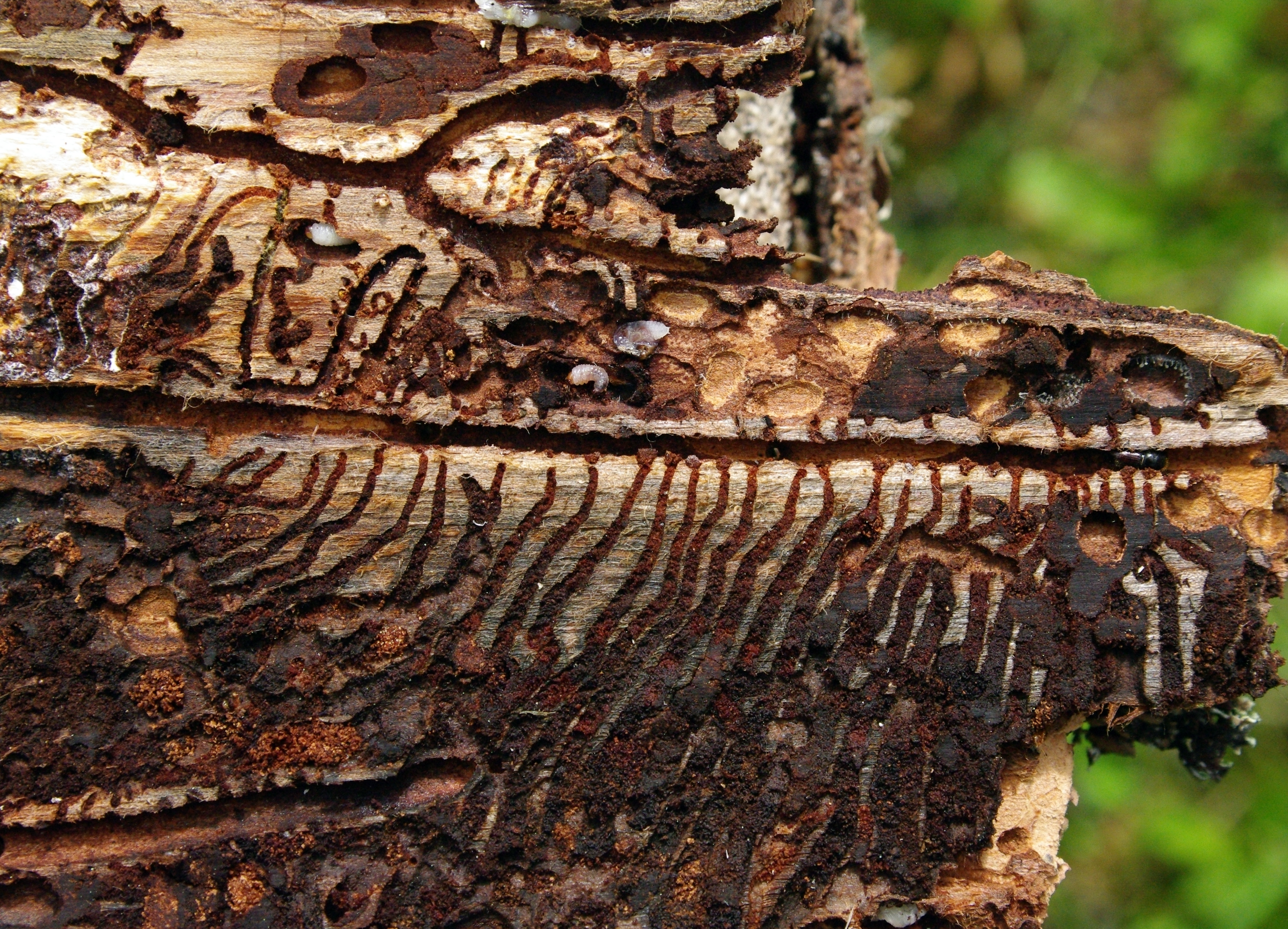
Galleries of Ips typographus bark beetles weaken conifers such as Norway spruce, and can seriously harm commercial forestry.

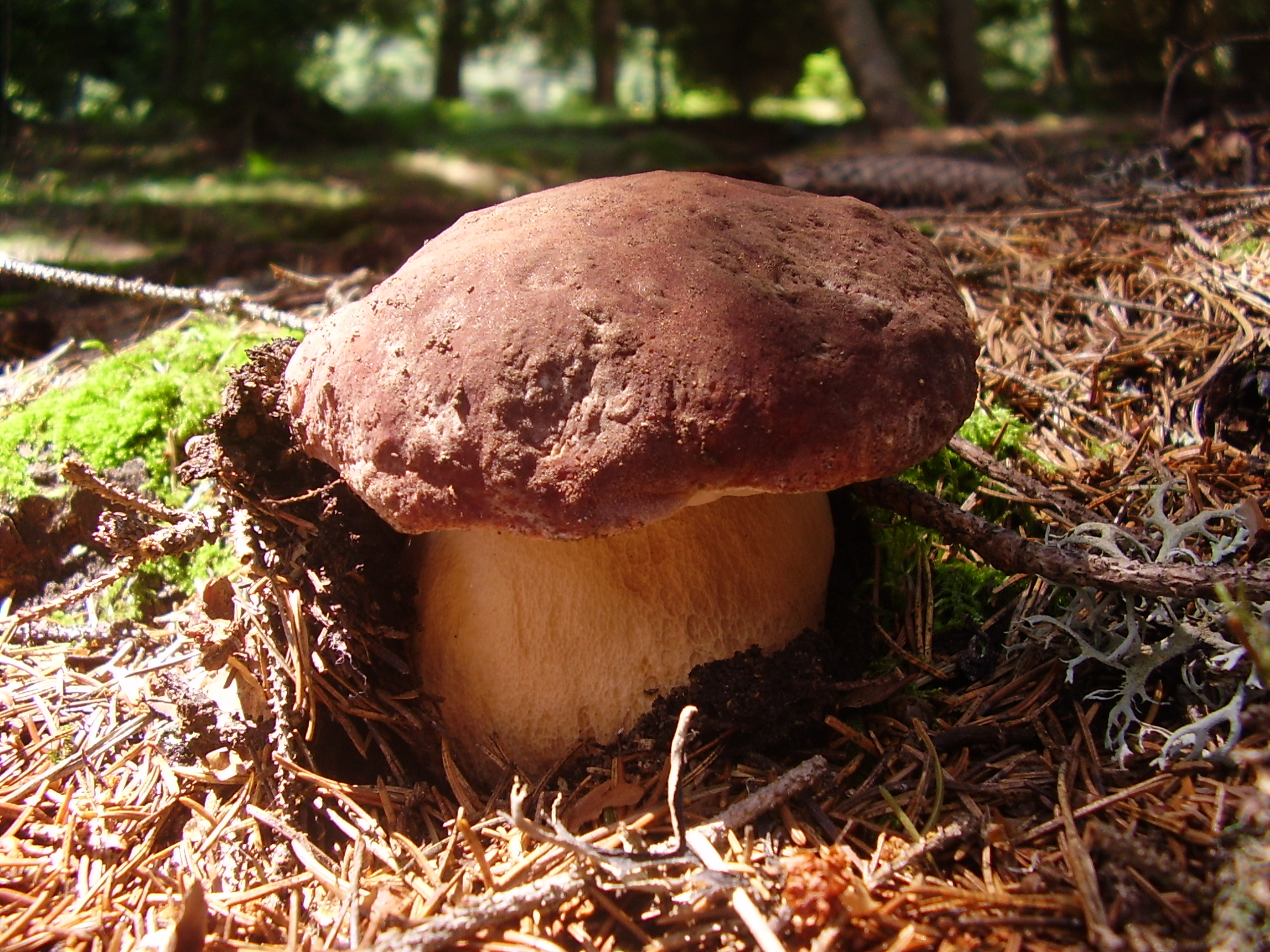
The pine bolete Boletus pinophilus forms an ectomycorrhizal association with several pines.

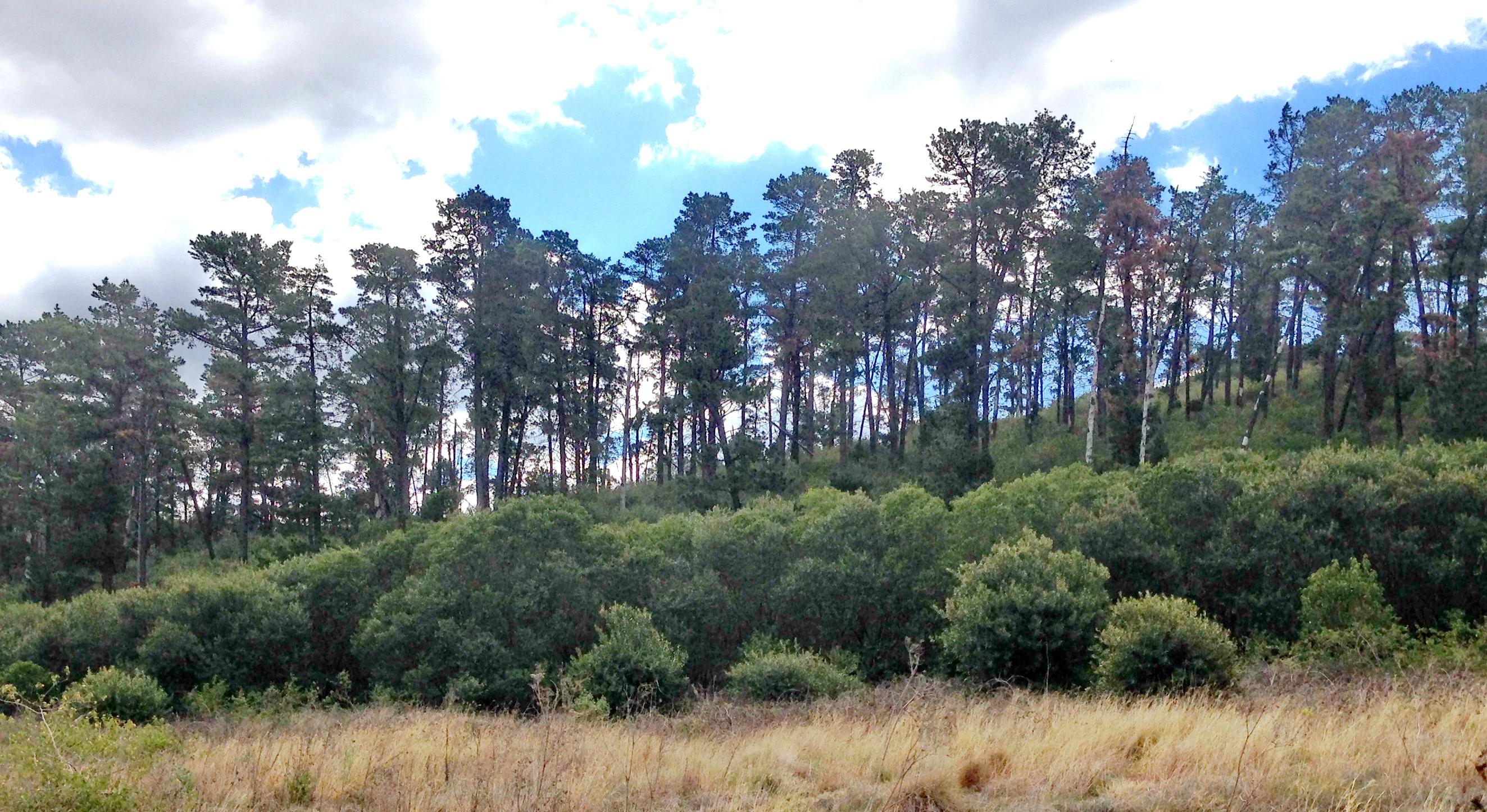
Pinus radiata (radiata or Monterey pine) is an invasive species in Australia (pictured), New Zealand, and South Africa.

== Interaction with humans ==
=== Conservation ===
As of 2025, 83 species of conifer are listed as vulnerable, 94 are endangered, and 30 are critically endangered. Among the most endangered species is Abies beshanzuensis, the Baishan fir, which is at risk from flooding; only some 600 individual trees remain in the wild in Southeast China. The causes of decline of other species include habitat loss through agriculture and land development, over-exploitation, habitat degradation, invasive species, and climate change.

=== Economic importance ===
The softwood derived from conifers is more easily worked than hardwood from broadleaved (angiosperm) trees. This makes it widely used and of great economic value, its many uses including construction, furniture, telegraph poles and fencing. A large part of production is used for paper. In the United Kingdom, the 48% of the woodland that is coniferous yields over 90% of the timber; the top species is sitka spruce, yielding about half of the timber produced. Worldwide, wood products reached a value of $100 billion by the end of the 20th century.

Conifer wood cross sections
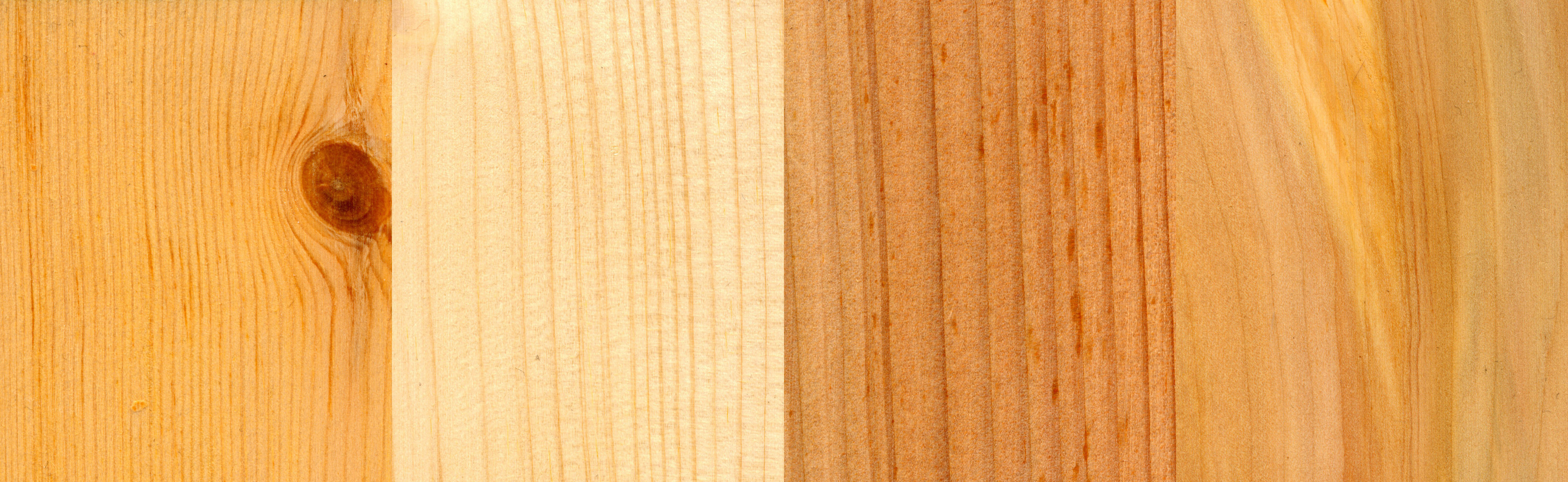

Conifers such as pine, spruce, cedar, fir, cypress, juniper, yew and arborvitae have been selected by plant breeders for ornamental purposes. Plants with unusual growth habits, sizes, and colours are propagated and planted in parks and gardens throughout the world.

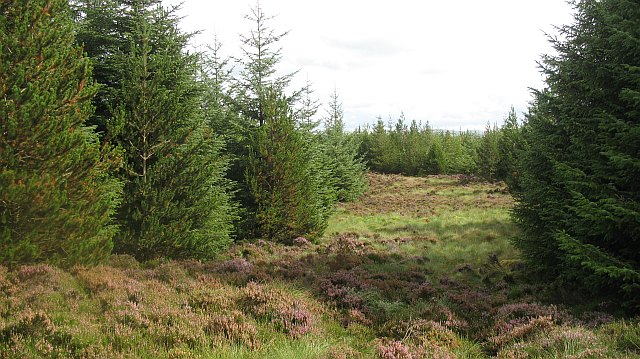
Commercial forestry using sitka spruce

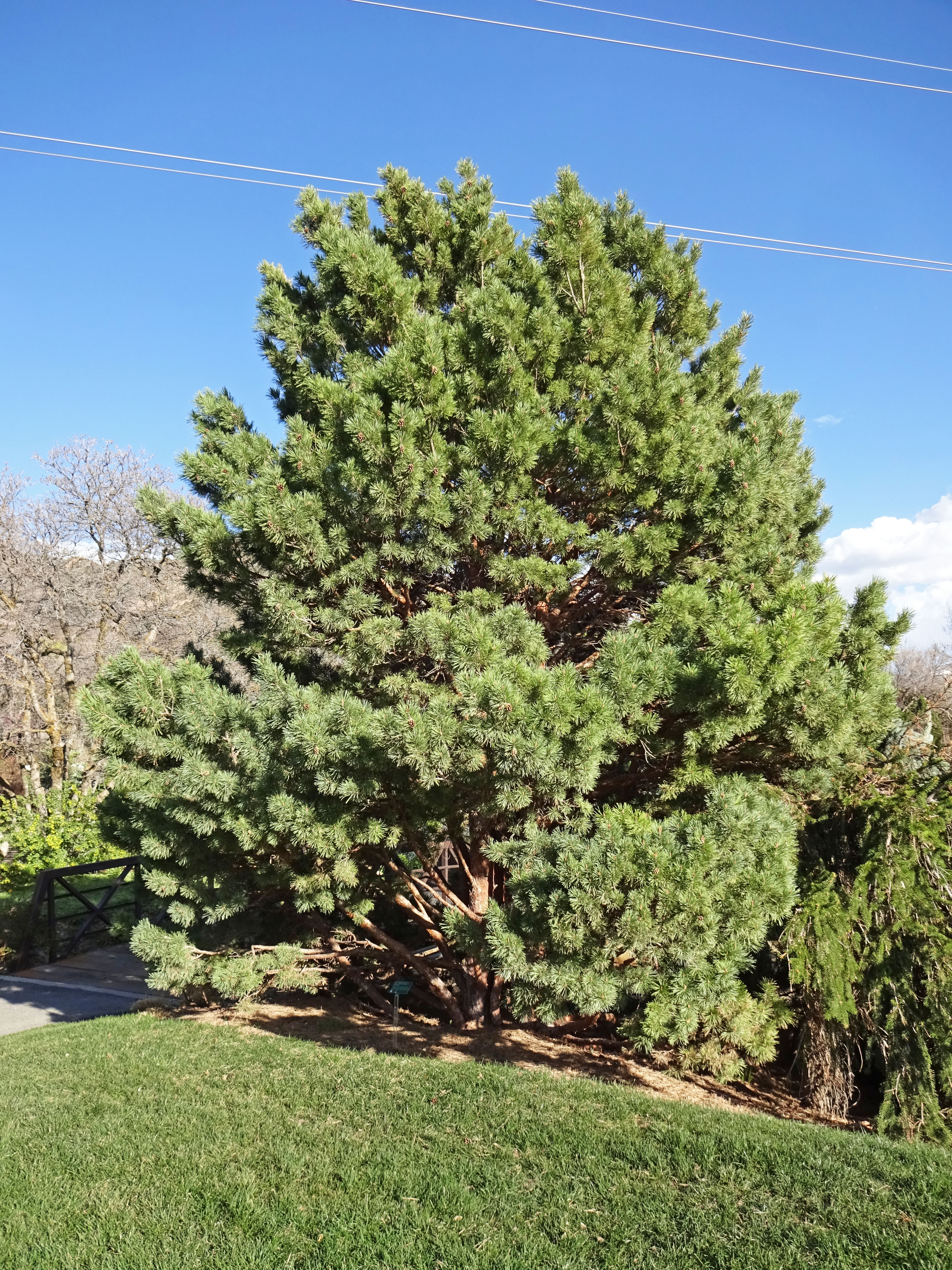
'Globosa', an ornamental cultivar of Scots pine

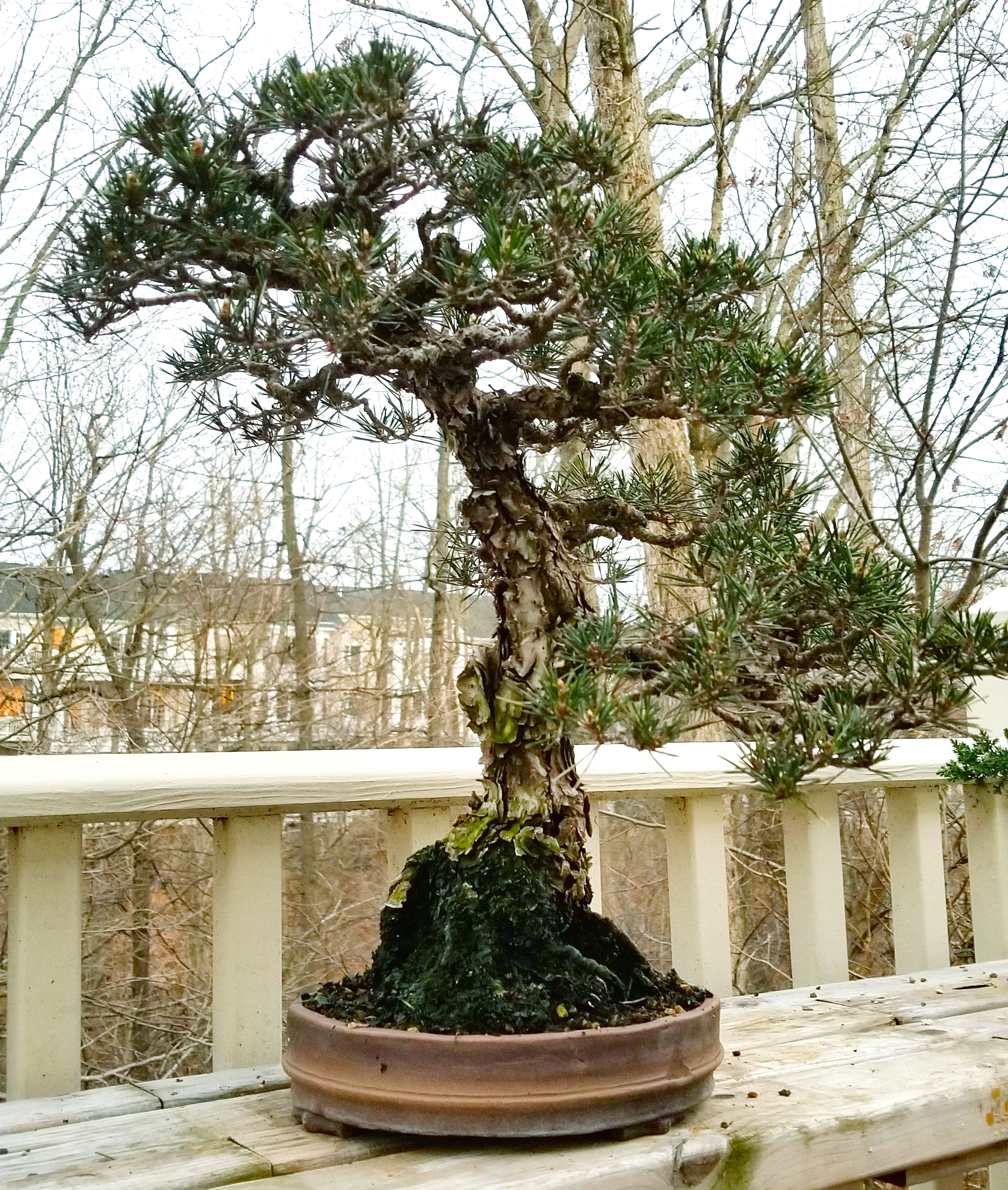
Pinus thunbergii 'Kotobuki'
as a 65-year-old bonsai

Conifers provide numerous non-wood products including ornamental and cultural items such as Christmas trees, bonsai, and topiary; foliage and wreaths for decorative greenery, mulch, and craft materials; and bark and roots traditionally used for food, medicine, natural dyes, and niche uses for compounds like taxol. Resins tapped from conifers yield commercial products such as turpentine and rosin, while essential oils extracted from foliage or wood are used in fragrances and industrial applications. Seeds, fruits, and cones include edible pine nuts and juniper berries used as a spice.

=== As food and drink ===
The Sámi and indigenous North American peoples used to eat conifer cambium. They peeled the bark and removed, dried, and ground the cambium into flour.

Spring tips of pine, fir, and spruce have been used to flavour beer in the absence of hops. Spruce beer was common in the colonial United States and eastern Canada, made from red or black spruce. Crush produced spruce-beer soda until 2000. Sahti, a beer using juniper, is brewed in rural areas in Finland.

The Abenaki in North America drank pine needle tea with teaberry and honey, while in winter, the Iroquois made hemlock tea by boiling the past season's growth. In Korea, Solip-cha is a needle tea made mostly from Korean red pine or Manchurian red pine.

=== In culture ===
Across many cultures, coniferous traits such as being evergreen, longevity, and endurance provide metaphors for elevation, immortality, and community resilience. Their persistent greenery has served as an emblem of life's continuity, to express intangible human values, and link the physical world to spiritual and cosmological ideas. Within Iroquois tradition, the eastern white pine was elevated to the Tree of Peace, symbolizing the unity and enduring harmony of the Haudenosaunee Confederacy. Such an interpretation resonates with mythological motifs such as the World Tree or Tree of Life that represent unity, the sacred, and the continuity of life in diverse cultural contexts.
