= Cyclaneusma needle cast =

Fungal plant disease

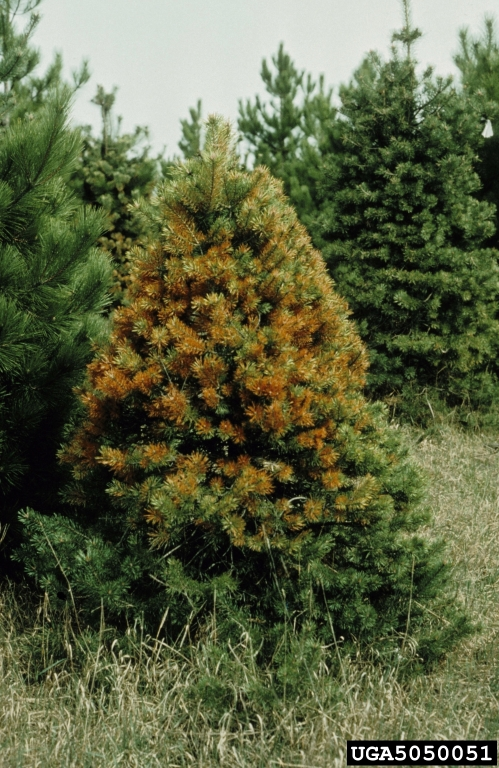
Symptoms on Scots pine

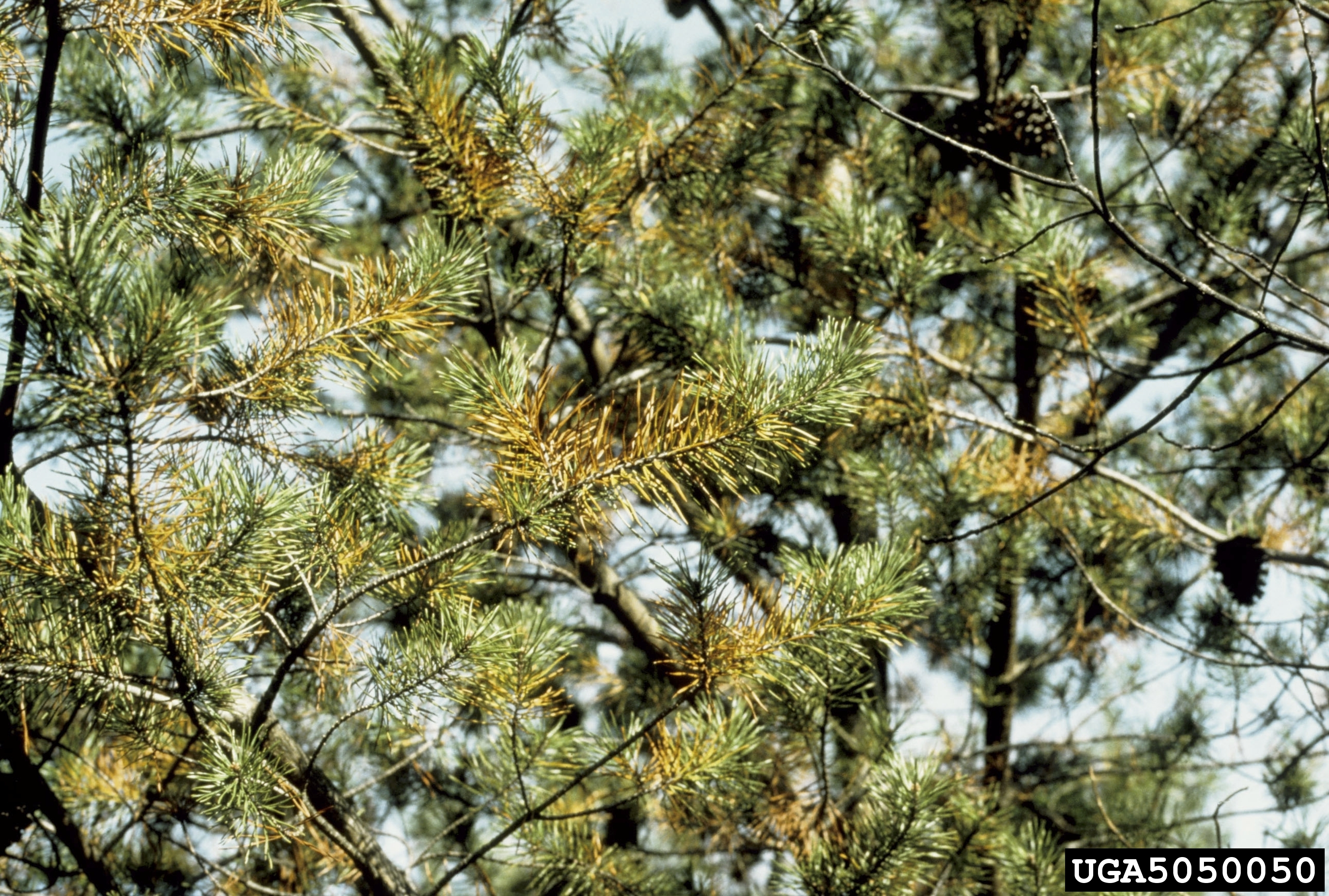
Symptoms on jack pine

Cyclaneusma needle cast is a fungal disease that is a part of the phylum, Ascomycota. It infects pine trees. After infection by Cyclaneusma, most pines do not display symptoms until 10 months after the initial infection. Symptoms include needles developing yellow spots, horizontal brown bands around the needles, swelling of needles, and off-white fruiting bodies formed on infected needles. Because Cyclaneusma is an ascomycete it produces two spore types, an asexual (conidiomata) and sexual (ascomycota) spore. Controlling Cyclaneusma has presented a challenge as the disease can survive on both living and dead needles during the winter months. Effective management methods include planting new pines in non-shaded, well drainable soil as well as spraying fungicide. Cyclaneusma needle cast is an important fungal disease because it directly impacts the commercial value of decorative pines as well as lumber.

== Hosts and symptoms ==
=== Hosts ===
Cyclaneusma primarily attacks Scots pines. Austrian white, Eastern white, and ponderosa pines are also among the infected. Young Scots pines have been infected in North Dakota, South Dakota, Nebraska, and Kansas in the US. There have also been many incidents in New Zealand. Cyclaneusma has been seen on ponderosa pines in North Dakota and Nebraska. During early autumn, needles within the interior of the infected tree begin to develop yellow spots. As the fall progresses and the temperature drops, the infected needles become darker while brown horizontal bands appear on the needles’ surface. From October until about May, off-white fruiting bodies called pseudothecia appear on the yellow needles. This is a macroscopic sign as the fruiting bodies swell with moisture making them visible to the naked eye. The yellowing of needles that occurs in early September actually leads to premature – or the first detection of – needle-cast which causes a stunted growth. The most infected needles are prematurely shed by December. Because the infected needles are within the interior of the tree, the newer needles on the outer surface of the pines are flushed green and resistant to the disease. However, the premature shedding of needles in the interior can extend outwards leading to a loss in overall growth. The distribution of Cyclaneusma is not uniform but scattered with symptomatic and unaffected trees in close proximity with one another.

=== Symptoms ===
Needle cast diseases in general are somewhat difficult to diagnose simply because their symptoms are similar to low pH, poor nutrition, fertilizer or chemical burn, and even root rots. Correct diagnosis requires microscopic examination of the size and shape of the fungal producing ascospores. These fungal spores are produced quite infrequently; after the disease infects needles, it will not produce symptoms or additional spores until the following year. In addition, Cyclaneusma may not be the only fungus present on the diseased needles. Saprophytic fungi live on dead tissue and may therefore continue to worsen the infection on needles after they have fallen. Saprophytes will also be present if the needles were killed by fertilizer burn or root rots. Due to these obstacles, it is important to examine the spores directly after infection (while spores are being produced) in order to ensure that Cyclaneusma is indeed the pine’s cause of death.

== Disease cycle ==
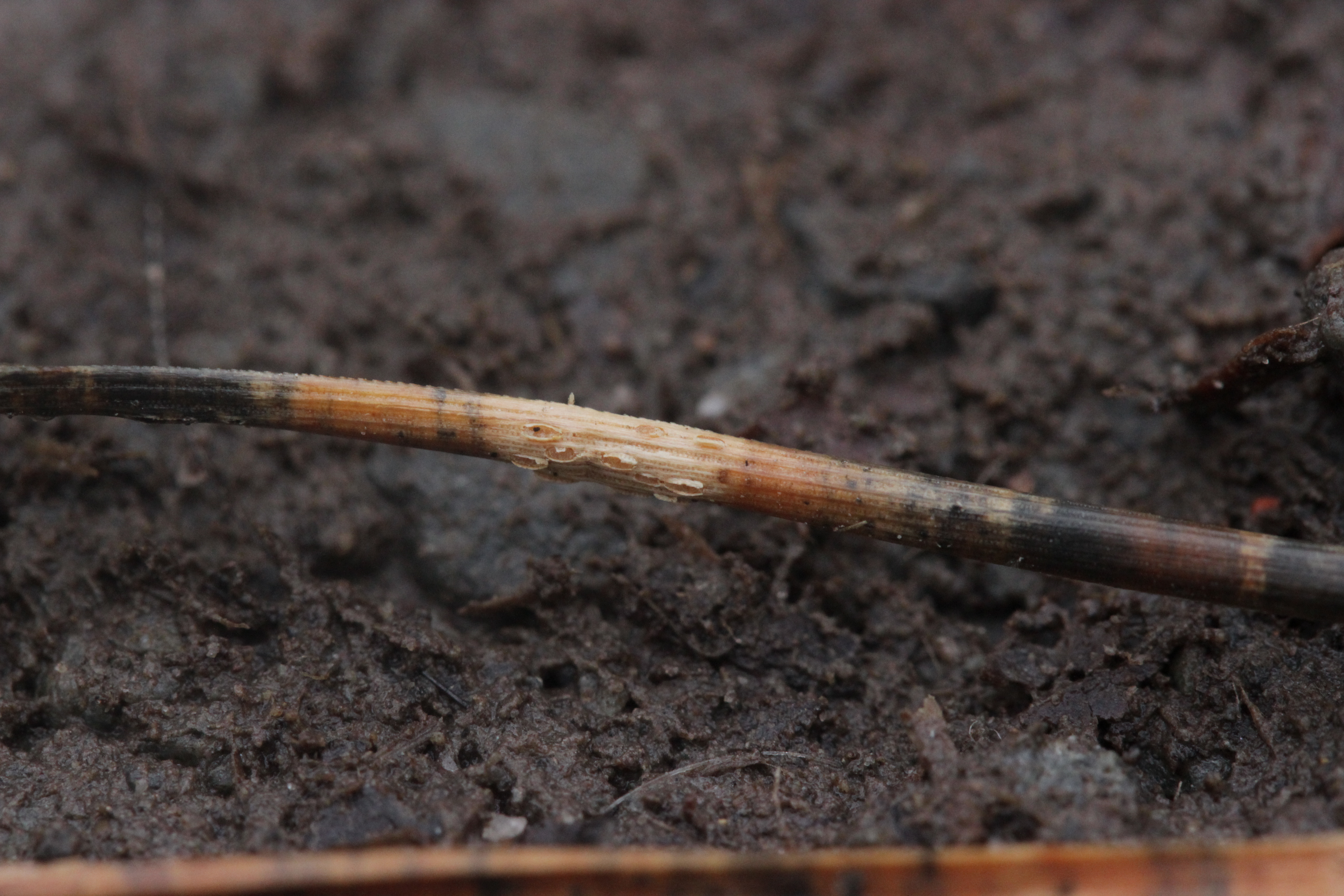
Cast conifer needle infected by Cyclaneusma

Cyclaneusma is an Ascomycete and therefore contains a sexual and asexual stage. During the asexual stage, conidia are produced which are capable of dispersing throughout the season. Additionally, Cyclaneusma produces a sexual stage by the Ascomycota. These Ascomycota are apothecial in shape and once infection of the host occurs, they locate to the subepidermal tissue of the host’s pine needles. As these apothecium develop, it will push on the epidermis of the needle causing a swelling of the needle to occur bilaterally. During favorable environmental conditions (moist environment), the apothecia produces asci, typically containing eight ascospores. These spores will disperse from fruiting bodies of the pine either through the wind or remain on the needle for prolonged periods of time. As the ascospores travel through the wind, they will land on new susceptible pine hosts. If conditions continue to be favorable, Cyclaneusma will enter the new host’s needle through the stomata and infect the plant.

Cyclaneusma has four primary periods of infection throughout the year. During the months of July through August, Cyclaneusma can infect the current year’s needles. Following this cycle, September through November as well as late November through early December accounts for the 2nd and 3rd infection respectively. During this time, the cooler, moist environment promote infection of Cyclaneusma. These three periods account for 50% of all new Cyclaneusma infections. As winter persists, Cyclaneusma will survive on pine needles attached to the tree as well as the needles no longer attached to the host. The months between April through June account for the remaining 50% of infection by Cyclaneusma. This is because the moist, cool conditions allow the disease to infect both mature and newly growing needles. It is worth noting that while spores are consistently produced throughout the spring, summer, and fall months; symptoms of Cyclaneusma may not appear on pines until at least 10 months after the initial infection.

== Environment ==
Cyclaneusma is favored by wet, humid, above freezing conditions. This provides adequate conditions for Cyclaneusma to thrive in the given environment. A study analyzing Cyclaneusma on Pinus radiata determined that continuous climate change (global warming) would favor the infection of pines by Cyclaneusma because much more of the environment would consist of moderately warm, wet, and humid conditions. Additionally, higher altitude elevations favor Cyclaneusma due to the wetter environment.

The high demand for pine trees during the holiday month of December can contribute to the success of Cyclaneusma. The clustering of pines in a limited area of land enable the disease to spread its ascospores over short distances but through high concentrations of susceptible hosts and therefore poses a problem for Christmas tree production companies. Cyclaneusma does not appear to be affected by insect vectors.

== Management ==
When choosing a site for plantation establishment, it is typically good practice to ensure it exhibits good drainage and is non shaded. It should not be next to old Scotch pine stands, which could still hold the Cyclaneusma. The trees in the plantation should have adequate spacing to allow for proper air circulation. Additionally, the owner should invest in tree stock which displays resistance or tolerance to Cyclaneusma. After planting, attentive tree care must be undertaken, including nutrient management and water and weed control, to ensure robust, healthy trees. To scout for the disease, the threshold level is 20% of sampled trees showing signs. At this point, the owner should consider treating the entire plantation. In some areas, it is possible to control the disease through the silvicultural practice of thinning, selecting for trees with resistance to Cyclaneusma.

Cyclaneusma presents somewhat of a challenge to manage, as infected needles remain part of the tree throughout the winter and spring months. The creation of spores as well as infection can occur in freezing temperatures with wet needles. Inoculated needles may not develop symptoms for up to a year from the infection date, proving difficult for the effectiveness of pesticides applied in the first season to be judged. Infected needles on or under the tree retain the ability to release spores any time during the growing season, so they should be removed as soon as possible. It is typically recommended to apply five treatments of fungicide, such as chlorothalonil or dodine, when the threshold level is met, beginning in March and continuing roughly every 5–6 weeks through October. If the infection level of a Christmas tree plantation is not yet too high, the aesthetics of the tree can be saved by using a leaf blower to remove infected needles from the tree.

== Importance ==
This disease greatly reduces the aesthetic, commercial value of decorative trees, as well as lumber yield. Cyclaneusma is one of the most important diseases of forests in New Zealand. A study set up in 1977 measured the disease severity of a tree stand over a six-year period. Healthy trees were shown to exhibit 100m^3/ha more stem volume than infected. Projected revenue loss of lumber from diseased trees was expected to be $3200/ha. Disease levels assessed in 2005 and 2006 in New Zealand attributed nearly $40 million in lost revenue per year. In 2010, an outbreak of Cyclaneusma on Swiss mountain pines in Italy affected nearly 90% of the trees, exhibiting symptoms anywhere from yellowing of the needles to transparent crowns.
