= Phytophthora pluvialis =

Scientific classification
- Domain: Eukaryota
- Clade: Sar
- Clade: Stramenopiles
- Phylum: Oomycota
- Class: Peronosporomycetes
- Order: Peronosporales
- Family: Peronosporaceae
- Genus: Phytophthora
- Species: P. pluvialis

Binomial name
- Phytophthora pluvialis Reeser, Sutton & Hansen, 2013

Species of oomycete

Phytophthora pluvialis is a semi-papillate plant pathogen, causing red needle cast disease. This mainly infects tanoak-Douglas-fir forests of western Oregon. It was reported in Cornwall. UK, in October 2021; the first record for Europe.

== Description ==
Phytophthora pluvialis is homothallic; it forms oogonia in culture. Its oogonia are terminal, smooth and globose, being approximately 30 μm in diameter, and possess amphigynous antheridia. Its oospores are globose and aplerotic, being about 28 μm in diameter. Sporangia formed in water are ovoid and slightly irregular, semi-papillate, terminal or subterminal, and partially caducous with medium-sized pedicels.
