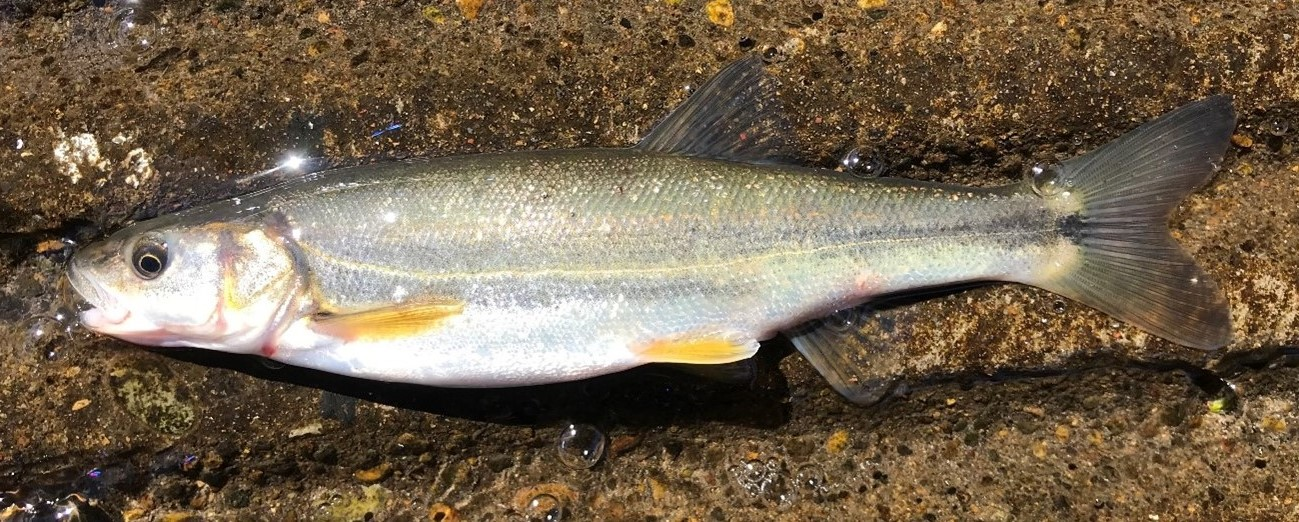

Conservation status
- Least Concern (IUCN 3.1)

Scientific classification
- Kingdom: Animalia
- Phylum: Chordata
- Class: Actinopterygii
- Order: Cypriniformes
- Family: Leuciscidae
- Subfamily: Laviniinae
- Genus: Ptychocheilus
- Species: P. umpquae

Binomial name
- Ptychocheilus umpquae Snyder, 1908

= Umpqua pikeminnow =

Species of fish

The Umpqua pikeminnow formerly called the Umpqua squawfish (Ptychocheilus umpquae) is a species of freshwater ray-finned fish belonging to the family Leuciscidae, the daces, chubs, Eurasian minnows and related species. This large fish is endemic to Oregon, and is the smallest species of pikeminnow. It is native to the Umpqua and Siuslaw river drainages.

== Description ==
The Umpqua pikeminnow has around 60 to 63 scales between the head and dorsal fin. It also usually has 66 to 81 scales along its lateral line, 9 rays on its dorsal fin, and 8 rays on its anal fin. They can reach 44 cm (17 in) in total length, but are more often 31 cm (12 in).

== Distribution and habitat ==
Umpqua pikeminnow are found in the Southwest part of Oregon, usually along the Umpqua and Siuslaw river drainages, as well as the Siltcoos, Woahink, and Tahkenitch lakes. It has also been introduced in the Rogue River. The Rogue River introduction has two possible sources: 1) in 1994 a flood breached the north Rogue drainage divide, causing pikeminnow to escape through the Cow Creek system, or 2) in 1978 through an unscreened farm pond on Wolf Creek.

The fish inhabit the pools or sluggish runs of small rivers and creeks, usually found in waters less than 1 m deep.

== Biology ==
While the Umpqua pikeminnow's life history is not well documented, it is likely similar to that of their closest relative, the Northern pikeminnow; adults move upriver to spawn in the summer months, typically distributing their eggs amongst substrate such as gravel. The eggs hatch within a week or two, and larvae drift downstream as they are caught against the current. The larvae eventually reach shallow, low-velocity parts of the rivers, where they feed and grow over the next few years, gradually moving into deeper waters as they grow.

Adult Umpqua pikeminnow predate on salmon, steelhead, and trout while juvenile individuals compete with these native fish for the same resources.

Juvenile Umpqua pikeminnow have been seen aggregating with other fish species, such as Umpqua chub and juvenile Redside shiner.

== Conservation status ==
As of 2012, the IUCN Red List lists the Umpqua pikeminnow under least concern. Their population is considered stable with an undisclosed yet large population, but further studies may need to be conducted to determine if the population is slowly declining or not.

== Taxonomy ==
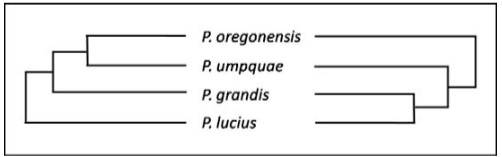
The two hypothesized relationships of the pikeminnow family.

The evolutionary history of the Ptychocheilus genus was never well understood, and many studies disputed where the Umpqua pikeminnow should be placed. There had been some previous studies that suggested that the Umpqua pikeminnow may actually be a variant of the Northern pikeminnow, given their very close range and subtle differences, but has been disproven.

The two prevailing theories grouped the Umpqua pikeminnow and Northern pikeminnow together as either the ancestral or most recent group of the genus. Recent studies that investigated the Ptychocheilus genome suggests that the latter may be correct, but further analysis is required to understand the relation between the species and their close relatives, as the pikeminnow family may actually be from separate lineages.

There is also evidence to suggest that the two Umpqua pikeminnow subpopulations in the Umpqua and Siuslaw drainages may actually represent two different species due to genomic differences between the two populations.

== Population control ==
The Umpqua pikeminnow, along with the Northern pikeminnow, have been considered "undesirable" or "nuisance" fish that got in the way of stocking river systems with more favorable species, such as salmon and trout. Because of this, some studies have been conducted to find a way to control Umpqua pikeminnow populations without causing nearly as much damage to the desired fish species. These chemicals include 1,1'-methylenedi-2-naphthol, more commonly known as squoxin, and 2-hydroxy-l-naphthyl-methane. Squoxin was used in a field application treatment to exclusively eliminate all the pikeminnow in a small lagoon, proving to be an effective pikeminnow piscicide.
