= Siltcoos, Oregon =

Unincorporated community in the state of Oregon, United States

Coordinates: 43°53′20″N 124°03′49″W

Siltcoos (also known as Siltcoos Station) is an unincorporated community in Lane County, Oregon, United States. It is about 13 miles (21 km) south of Florence on the east shore of Siltcoos Lake.

The word Siltcoos is Native American and could refer to the name of a local chief or to a family name. It is also possible that "Tsilt" and "Coos" translates to "plenty elk" in the Coosan language and in reference to the coastal Roosevelt Elk herds. The spelling of the community was "Tsiltcoos" but "Siltcoos" was made the official name by a 1917, Board on Geographic Names decision. 1916, marked the establishment of "Lane" station on the Coos Bay Line of the Southern Pacific Railroad. It also had a post office named Siltcoos. Lane was the last station on the line in Lane County, Oregon. In 1921, the train station name was to match the post office, thus becoming Siltcoos Station. Siltcoos post office closed in 1963, with mail going to Gardiner.

== History ==
=== United States - Coos, Lower Umpqua, Siuslaw Indian Relations ===
In 1848, the British granted sovereignty of the Oregon Territory to the United States through the Oregon Organic Act. This created the U.S. Oregon Territory and protected all Indian rights and title to land to the Native Americans living there, stating, “That nothing in this Act contained shall be construed to impair the rights of persons or property now pertaining to the Indians in said territory so long as such rights shall remain unextinguished by the treaty between the United States and said Indians.” This, however, was not to be the case.

In 1855, the Coast Indian Reservation (later called the Siletz Reservation), included the entire Oregon Central Coast Range and traversed more than a million acres from Cape Lookout to the mouth of the Siltcoos River. Those Native Americans defeated during the Rogue River Wars in Southern Oregon, relocated to this reservation. The reservation was a confusing and dark place for tribal members who challenged to translate their previous lives to the different central coast environment. Yet, it was not long before white settlers wanted more coastal land for themselves. In 1864, construction finished in on a stagecoach road between Eugene and the coast. By 1865, President Andrew Johnson granted a swath of reservation land to white settlers. In 1875, Oregon senator John Mitchell pushed Congress to open the entire region between Siltcoos River and Yaquina Bay for white settlement. In a few short years the confiscation of the land reserved as Tribal land in the Siltcoos region resulted in the relocation of Native Americans to the Coast Reservation and the Grand Ronde Reservation.

=== Siltcoos Homestead ===
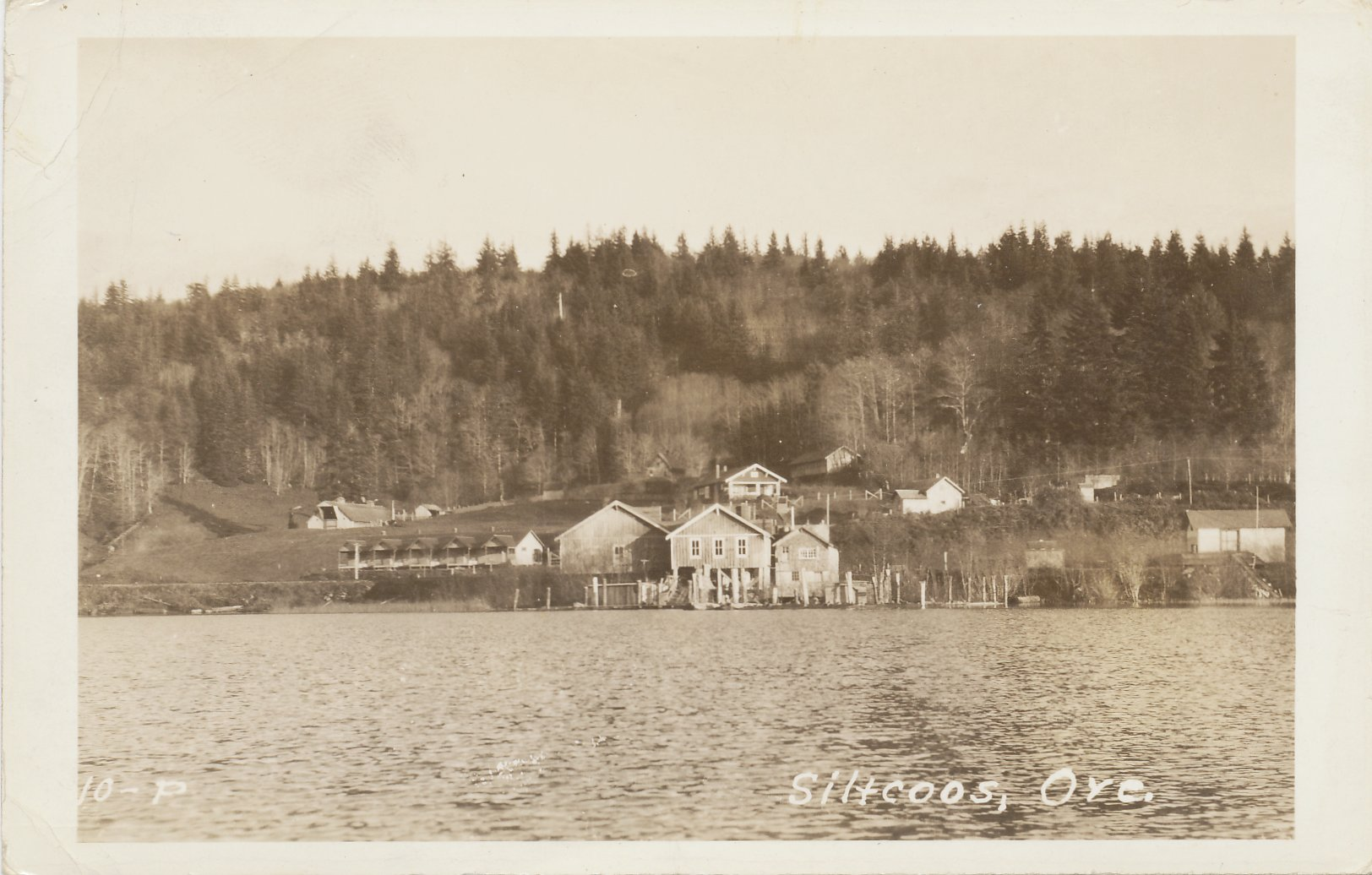
Siltcoos, Oregon (Post office/left, Dance hall/Center, Store/left, Cabins/background left, school/background right)

Danish immigrant, Neal Christensen, homesteaded the area known as Siltcoos in 1892, settling under the National Timber and Stone Act. He and his sons built docks and piers to enable the shipment of supplies to build the Lane line of the SP Railroad. During this time, the Christensen entrepreneurial spirit blossomed. They planted apples and figs along the shores of the lake and profited off of red clover ranching. They created a ferry system of barges between neighboring lakes that connected the roadway to the railroad construction area. The areas between the lakes were connected via stagecoaches and small gauge rails. In 1914, the rail was completed including a railroad switch and stop in front of what became Siltcoos Station. As a result of the rail, small industry such and lumber mills and fishing resorts started to flourish and the lake population grew. The stagecoach road built by Christensen that connected part of the road between Woahink lake and Siltcoos lake became known as Siltcoos Station Road.

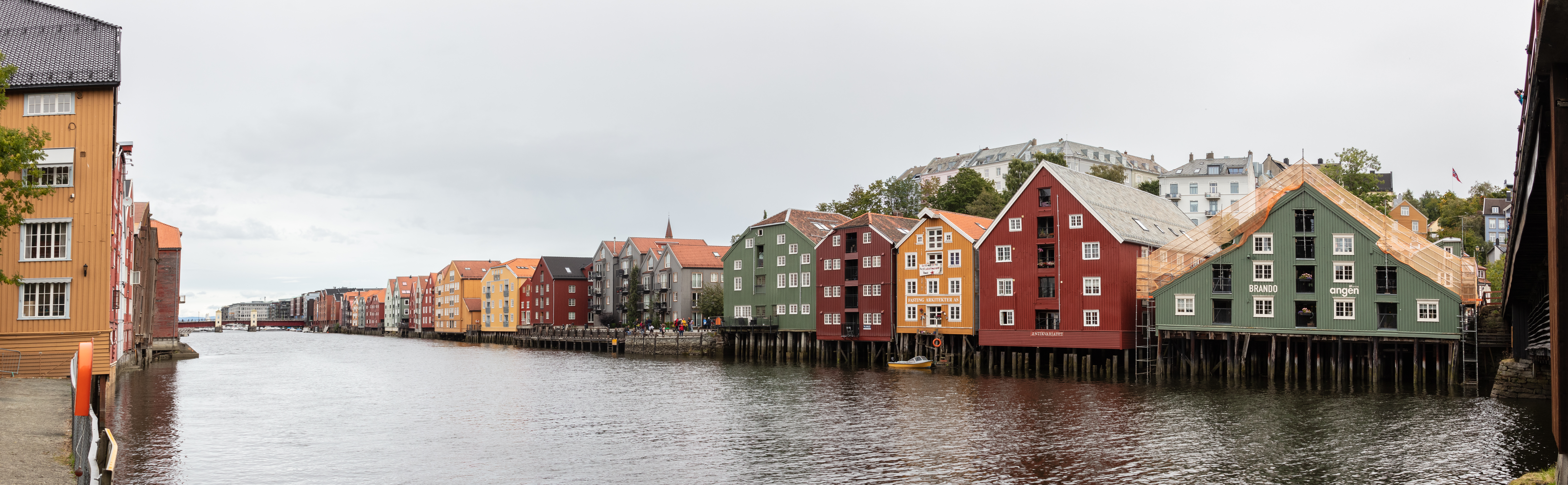
Scandinavian stilt houses in Trondheim, similar in construction to those built by Christensen in Siltcoos.

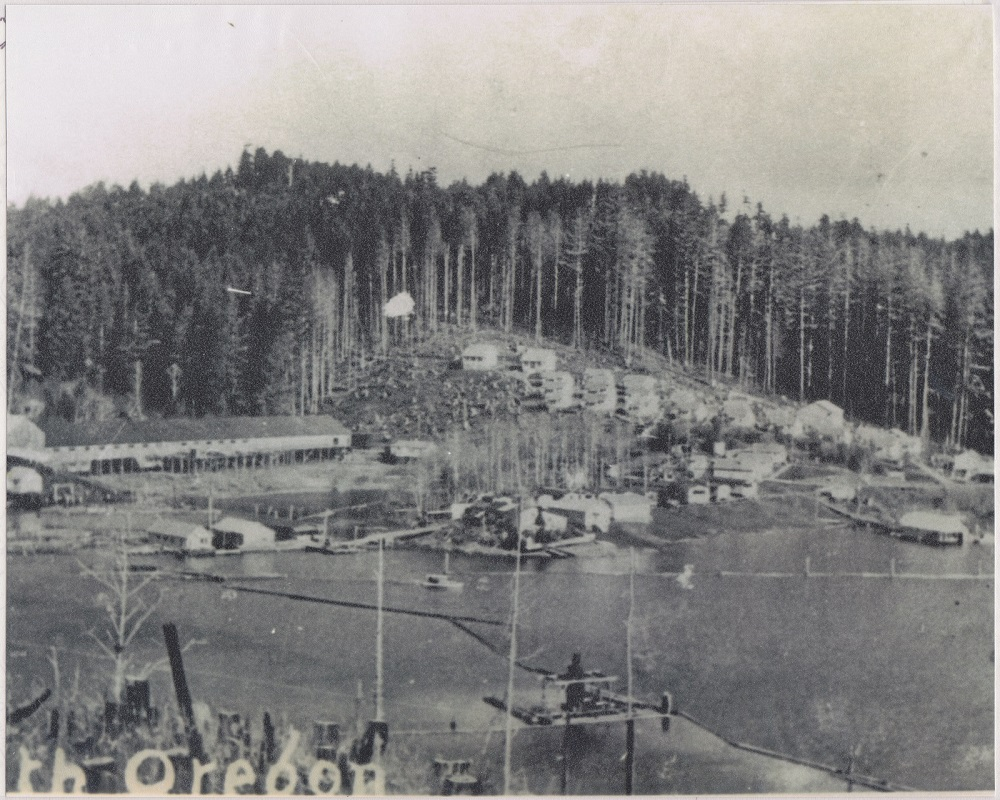
Booth Lumber Mill, Siltcoos, Oregon

By the 1910s and 1920s, the Christensens seized the opportunity and built a post office, store, and dance hall all using Scandinavian architecture with steep pitched roofs and on stilts over water. By the 1930s they had built five cabins, an outboard motor repair shop, petrol station, and a school. Christensen expanded his barge business by ferrying passengers and supplies throughout the lake to historic Darling's resort, the Roosevelt Hotel, Booth Lumber mill, Ada, or his retreat that included, "floating whorehouses in front of his store". A 1955, article from the Siuslaw News, explained how the men's operation functioned,

"During the period before the rail was built the Christensen's made money running passengers across the lakes. There were five boys to run and manage six gas boats for passenger service, one on Woahink, one on Tahkenitch and four on Siltcoos Lake. The Porter brothers had a railroad contract to haul materials. They had built a narrow gauge railroad, only about 2 feet wide, from the Siuslaw River at Glenada to the North end of Woahink Lake, where Honeyman Park is now. All the pilings, railroad timbers and supplies arrived by rail to Woahink Lake, then the supplies were loaded on barges and towed by the Christensen's to Siltcoos Lake, then to their destination at Ada to be used in the construction of the Railroad from Eugene to Coos Bay. The Railroad passes by the East side of Siltcoos Lake."

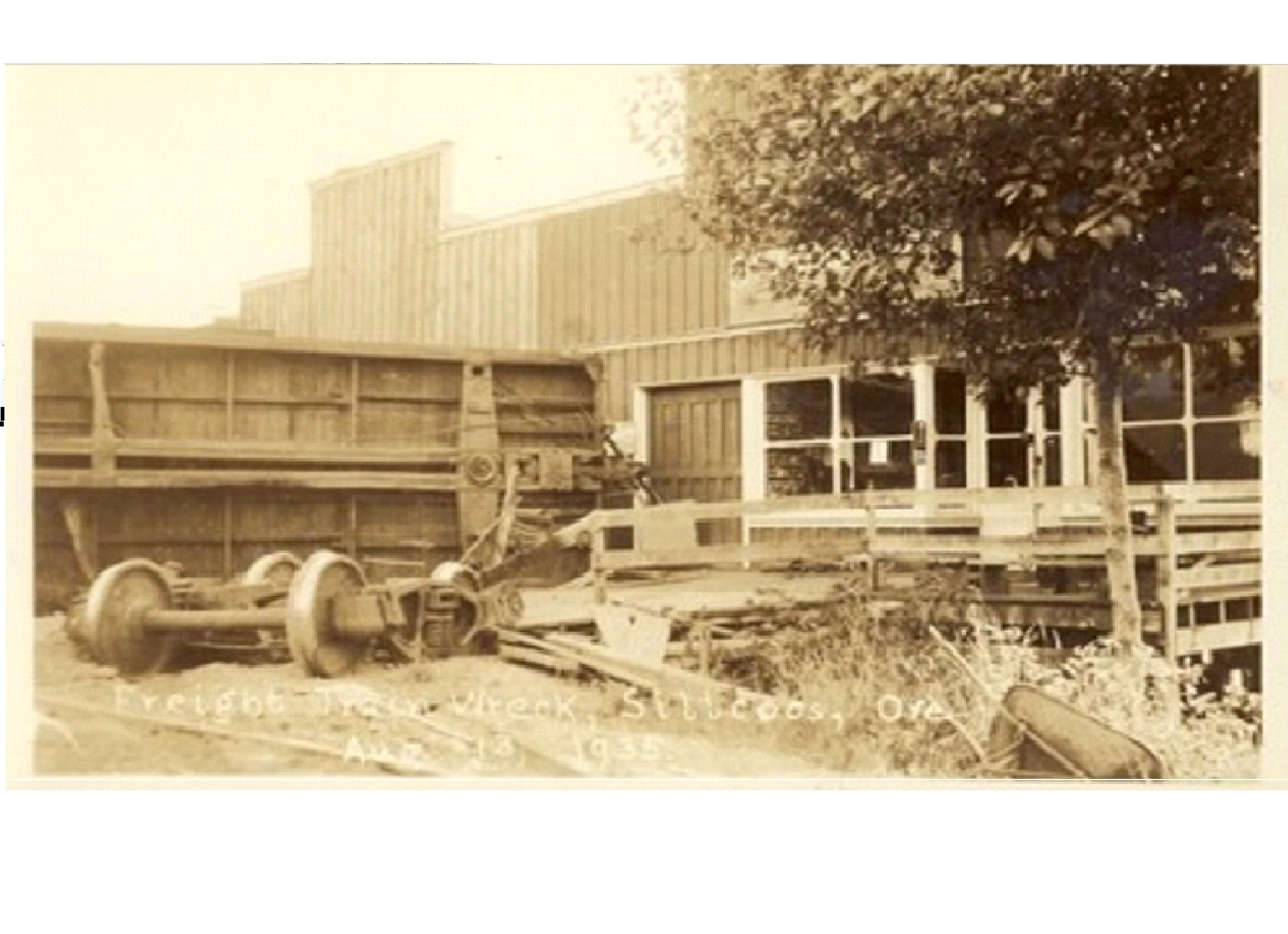
1935 Train Derailment at Siltcoos Station

Train services from Eugene to Coos Bay, including overnight stops at Siltcoos Station were common up until the mid-1960s. Events on the trains sponsored by the I.O.O.F. and other organizations were weekly occurrences. Dances in the hall during the winter months maintained a steady flow of people from the Willamette Valley. However, during this time accidents did occur. In April 1935 a train derailed in front of the store and dance hall, nearly crushing all three stilt buildings. A vagabond on the train was stuck under the wreck and required locals to dig him out. In the 1950s a massive tree trunk pushed up the Siltcoos river during a storm and smashed into the pilings of the post office.

=== Lane Community College ===
In 1972, after a decline in population as a result of the completion of the Oregon Coast Highway and its bridges, the Christensen's donate Siltcoos Station to Lane Community College. The college used it as in inter-collegiate art retreat for several years; however, repair and maintenance was neglected. In 2007, after being condemned, Lane Community College renovated the buildings via donations of time and supplies by the community. Unfortunately, the college was unable to utilize the retreat and sold it in 2015. All proceeds went to art scholarships per the request of the Christensen family. The resort again returned to being operated by private ownership and is in the process of a full restoration of the docks and buildings.
