= Siuslaw High School =

High school in Oregon, United States

Location
- 2975 Oak Street; Florence, Lane County, Oregon 97439; United States; 43.992°N 124.106°W

Information
- Type: Public high school
- School district: Siuslaw School District
- Principal: Michael Harklerode
- Teaching staff: 24.50 (FTE) (2018–19)
- Grades: 9–12
- Enrollment: 459 (2022-23)
- Student to teacher ratio: 14.1 (2022-23)
- Colors: Blue and gold
- Athletics conference: OSAA Far West League 3A-3
- Mascot: Vikings
- Website: www.siuslaw.k12.or.us/o/siuslaw-high-school
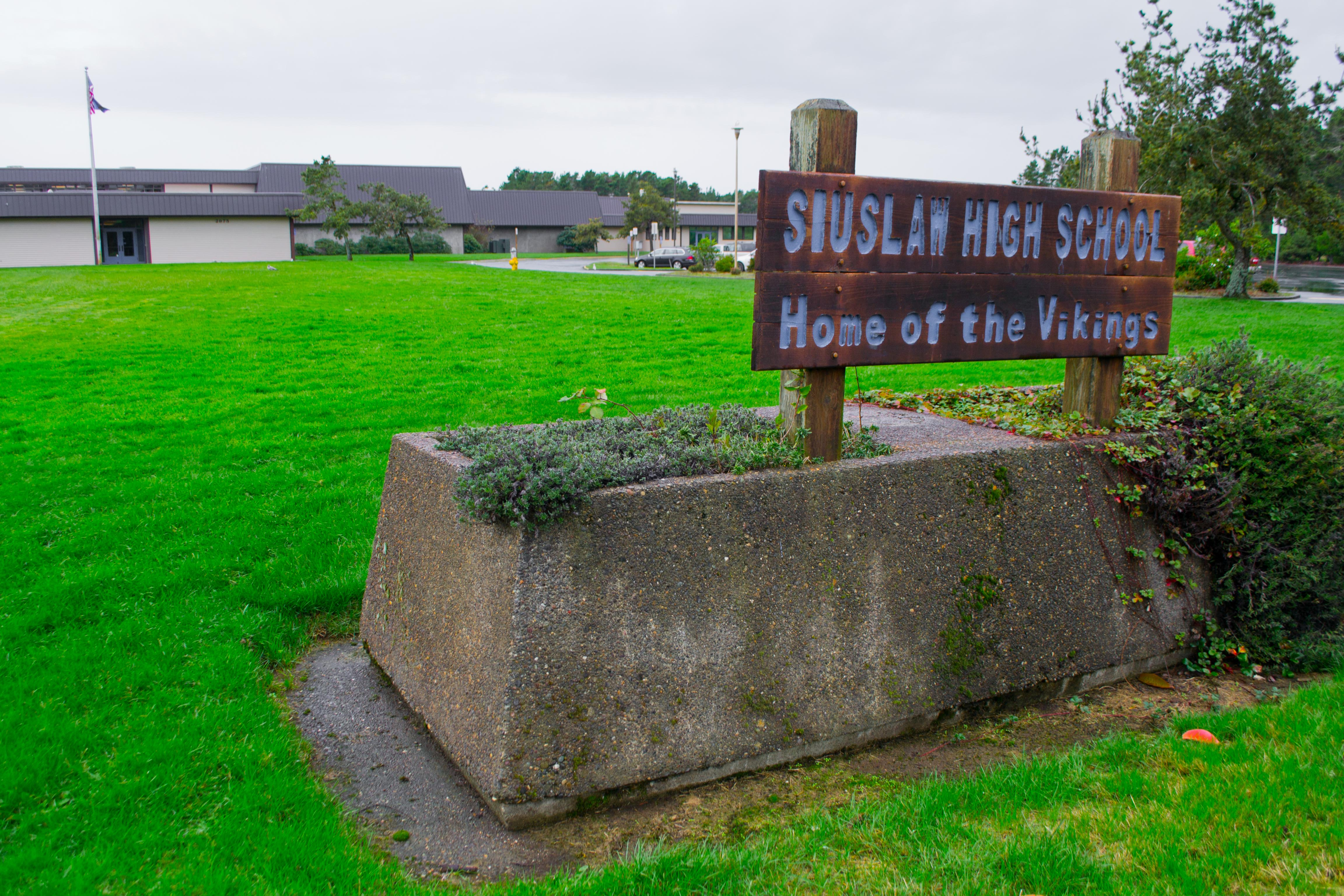

Siuslaw High School is a public high school in the northwest United States, located in Florence, Oregon. It is named after the local Siuslaw River, and the current principal is Michael Harklerode.

== History ==
Siuslaw High School was originally located on Quince Street in Florence. The athletic field consisted of a cinder track with a dirt infield, behind the junior high school, which both the junior and senior high schools utilized. The "Hans Peterson Memorial Field" was located southwest of both schools, on 2nd street. The former high school building has been demolished and, as of 2025, the lot is vacant.

The current school was first occupied in September 1970, with the class of 1971 being its first graduating class. In 1970, the location of the school was considered outside city limits, and students who lived in town had to be bussed to the school or, as many did, walked, drove or found other means of transport. The area's student population comes from a larger general region, with individuals coming from the north at Sea Lion Caves, east to Tiernan, up the North Fork of the Siuslaw, south to the county line and all points east of Woahink and Siltcoos lakes (Canary). Both the middle and high schools still share the track and football field, now located at the middle school. In the summer of 2019, the track was resurfaced.

== Academics ==
In 2008, 72% of the school's seniors received their high school diploma. Out of 144 students, 104 graduated, 27 dropped out, 1 received a modified diploma, and 12 are still in high school.

in 2023, 73% of students graduated on time while 24 dropped out.

== Athletics ==
Siuslaw competes at a 3A level.

State Championships:

Boys Golf: 1993, 1994, 2005.

Boys Track and Field: 1960, 1979, 1997, 2013, 2023, 2025

Girls Track and Field: 1984,1985, 1986

Football: 1981, 2006, 2021

Girls Basketball: 1988

Cheer: 1988, 1991, 1992, 1993

Boys XC: 1966, 1996, 2004, 2011, 2012, 2021*, 2021, 2022

Girls XC: 2004, 2005, 2006, 2007, 2008, 2010, 2015, 2021*, 2021

Speech: 1995

*Covid Year Championships.

In the 20th century, Siuslaw had a long-standing rivalry with Reedsport High School.
