= Cleawox Lake =

Lake in Oregon, United States

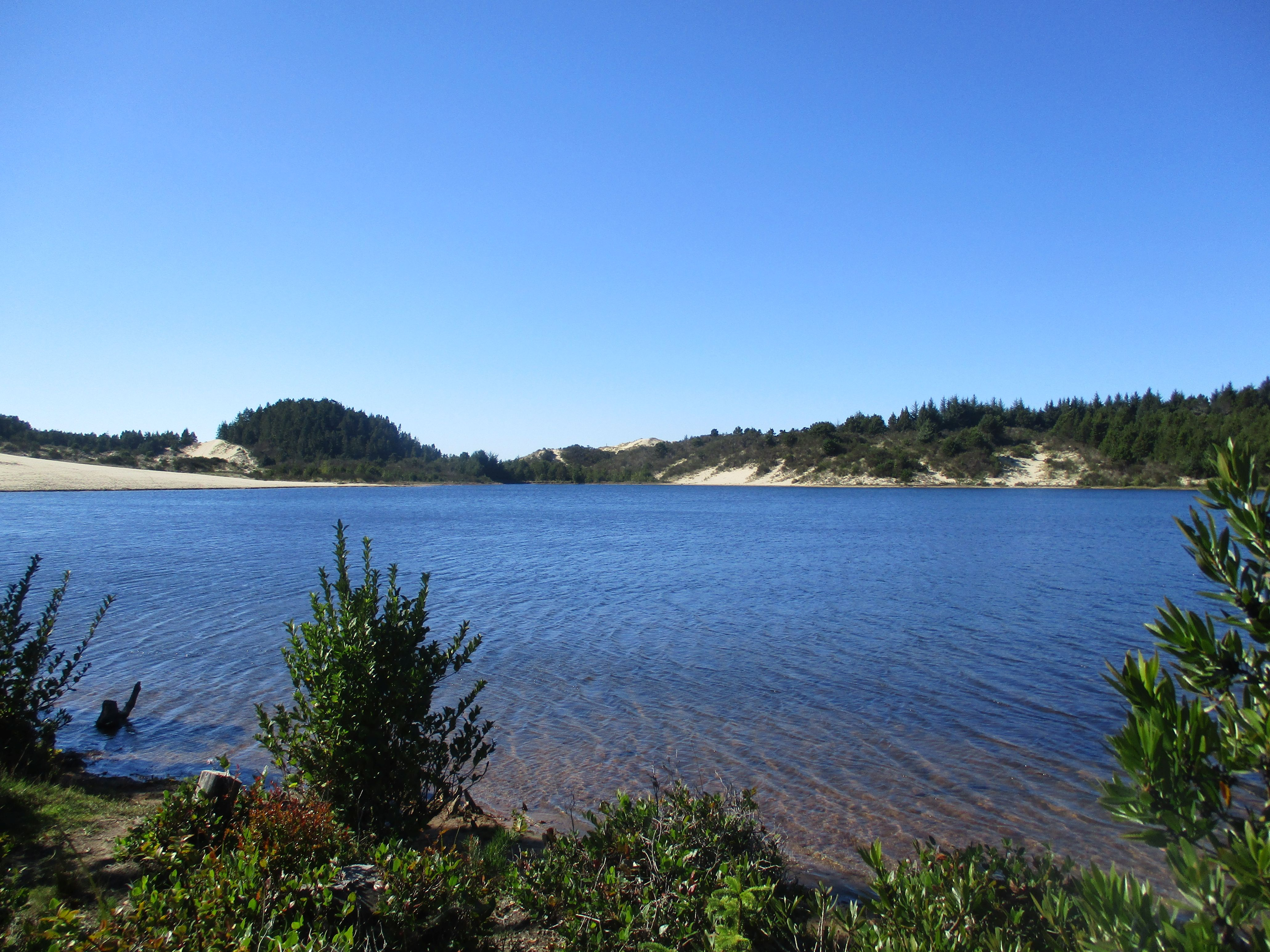
- Cleawox Lake Oregon

- Location of Cleawox Lake in Oregon, USA. Cleawox Lake (the United States)
- Location: Near Pacific Ocean coast in Lane County, Oregon
- Coordinates: 43°55′52″N 124°06′51″W
- Lake type: Natural, permanent, oligotrophic
- Primary inflows: Buck Creek
- Primary outflows: none
- Catchment area: 1.6 square miles (4.1 km^{2})
- Basin countries: United States
- Surface area: 87 acres (35 ha)
- Average depth: 17 feet (5.2 m)
- Max. depth: 48 feet (15 m)
- Water volume: 1,500 acre-feet (1,900,000 m^{3})
- Residence time: 4 months
- Shore length^{1}: 5.2 miles (8.4 km)
- Surface elevation: 75 feet (23 m)
- ^{1} Shore length is not a well-defined measure.

Cleawox Lake (klē' ə woks), is a body of water dammed by sand dunes along the Pacific Ocean coast of the U.S. state of Oregon. The lake is about 3 miles (5 km) south of Florence along U.S. Route 101. Sharing the lakeshore are private properties as well as Oregon Dunes National Recreation Area and Jessie M. Honeyman Memorial State Park, which also partly fronts on Woahink Lake. Cleawox is derived from the Siuslaw name for the lake.

== Geology ==
Cleawox Lake is a submerged remnant of the headwaters of a small coastal stream that existed before the most recent ice age. The lake formed after melting glaciers caused a rise in sea level that drowned the lower reaches of the stream. Sediments from the sluggish stream formed sand dunes, behind which the lake was dammed. The dunes, estimated to be advancing northward at 15 to 20 feet (4.6 to 6.1 m) a year, are encroaching on the lake.

== Watershed ==
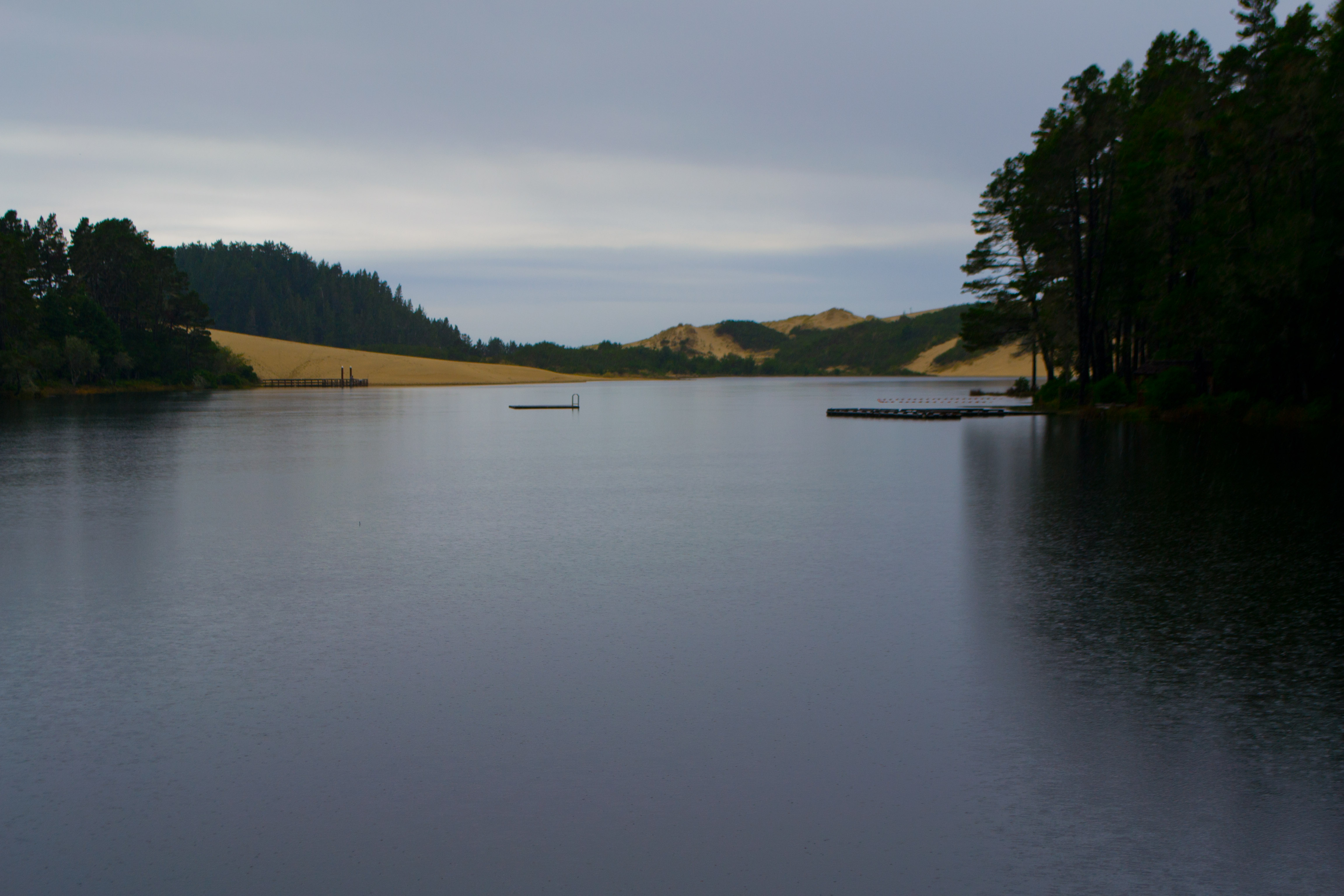
Cleawox Lake from Honeyman State Park

Covering only 1.6 square miles (4.1 km^{2}), Cleawox Lake's drainage basin is separate from the nearby Woahink–Siltcoos watershed to the east and south. Water enters Cleawox from small surface streams and by seepage, and no surface outflow has been identified. Soils are sandy and well-drained and support mainly pines and shrubs. Although the lake is saltier than most other coastal lakes in Oregon, it is also more transparent.

About 2 miles (3 km) of the lakeshore borders Oregon Dunes National Recreation Area, and about 1 mile (1.6 km) borders Honeyman State Park. The rest borders private property, including vacation homes and girl scout Camp Cleawox.

== Recreation ==
Park visitors use the lake for swimming, canoeing, and fishing for warm-water species and rainbow and coastal cutthroat trout. In the state park, picnic tables have been set up in sight of the water. No overnight camping is allowed next to the lake, but nearby areas of the state park have many campsites.

== See also ==
- List of lakes in Oregon
