= Siltcoos River =

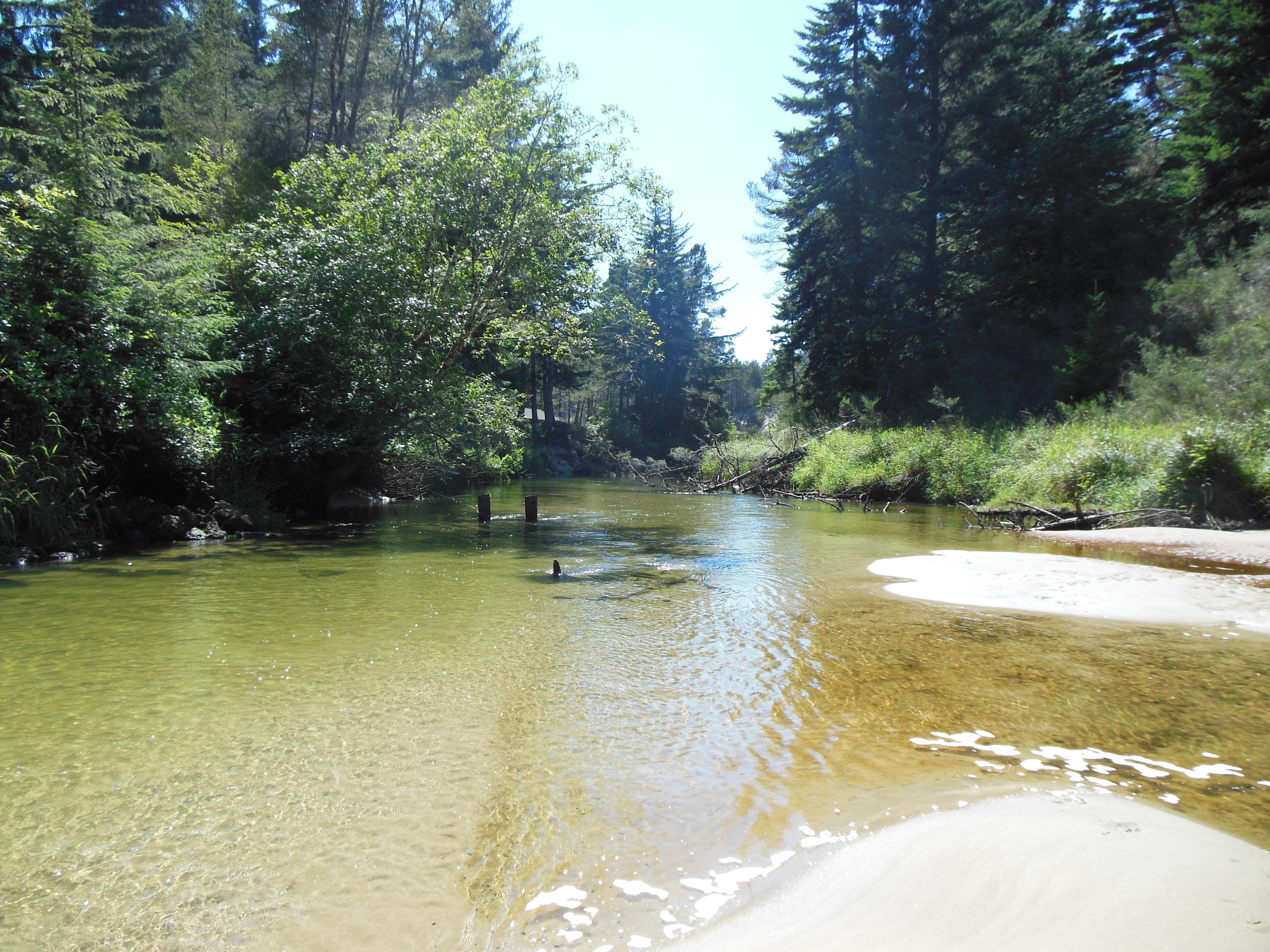
- The river just below the dam near Siltcoos Lake

- Location of the mouth of the Siltcoos River in Oregon
- Etymology: A local Native American chief and family, it is said.

Location
- Country: United States
- State: Oregon
- County: Douglas and Lane

Physical characteristics
- Source: Siltcoos Lake
  - location: near Westlake
  - coordinates: 43°52′53″N 124°06′45″W
  - elevation: 12 ft (3.7 m)
- Mouth: Pacific Ocean
  - coordinates: 43°52′25″N 124°09′14″W
  - elevation: 10 ft (3.0 m)

The Siltcoos River is a 3-mile (4.8 km) stream on the central coast of the U.S. state of Oregon. It begins at Siltcoos Lake, which straddles the border between Douglas and Lane counties. The river meanders generally west to the Pacific Ocean. It is located about 8 miles (13 km) south of Florence and 13 miles (21 km) north of Reedsport. The river, losing little elevation between source and mouth, passes through the Westlake section of Dunes City, under U.S. Route 101, and through a marshy area and sand dunes of Oregon Dunes National Recreation Area, which is within Siuslaw National Forest.

== Recreation ==
The river's relative flatness makes it suitable for canoeing in either direction, although the lower end has no boat launch and the beach nearby is closed between March 15 and September 15 to protect snowy plover nesting areas. Campgrounds along or near the river include Tyee, on the east side of U.S. Route 101, as well as Waxmyrtle, Lagoon, and Driftwood on the west side. Tyee and the Lodgepole picnic area near the lake have canoe launch points; a small dam just west of Route 101 requires a portage.

Trails wind through areas near the river. A 0.7-mile (1.1 km) self-guided nature trail follows an oxbow bend in the river near Lagoon campground. A 1.3-mile (2.1 km) trail meanders along the river from Waxmyrtle campground to the beach, and a 4.3-mile (6.9 km) loop trail connects primitive campgrounds near Siltcoos Lake. The Siltcoos Lake Trail, with a trailhead east of U.S. Route 101 about 7 miles (11 km) south of Florence, is frequented by mountain bikers.

Fishing for coho salmon, coastal cutthroat trout, and largemouth bass is allowed in the upstream stretch of the river between the lake and U.S. Route 101. Anglers fish from stream banks or from boats. There is a public boat ramp north of Westlake.

== See also ==
- List of rivers of Oregon
