= Canary, Oregon =

Unincorporated community in Oregon, US

Coordinates: 43°55′40″N 124°02′07″W

Canary is an unincorporated community in Lane County, Oregon, United States.

Canary is located approximately 4 miles east of Jessie M. Honeyman Memorial State Park, on Canary Road near Maple Creek. It was formerly a station on the Southern Pacific Railroad's Coos Bay line (now owned by Coos Bay Rail Line), founded in 1916.

According to Oregon Geographic Names, the name has no local significance and was chosen when railroad and postal service officials could not agree on a name. The post office ran from 1916 to 1940. Mail for the area was then handled by Siltcoos. Other suggestions had been "Stanwood" after the railroad station at this locale, or "Treowen". Orrin C. Stanwood had been the postmaster of the Alene post office, which had three locations from 1892 to 1912, and was eventually located at the Stanwood railroad flag stop in what was later named Canary. At one time Canary was the site of a large lumber mill and a store that housed the post office. The mill was established in 1950 as Donna Timber Products; later, it was sold and named Mount Canary Lumber. As of 1988, the store had been converted into a residence, and by 1992, it had been abandoned.

The Canary store was also known as the Canary Trading Post. Author Ralph Friedman says the trading post was "used for caucuses, debates, deals and gossip." At one time there was a Canary School, and a Canary (or Maple Creek) Grange.
