= Tahkenitch Lake =

Lake in Oregon, United States

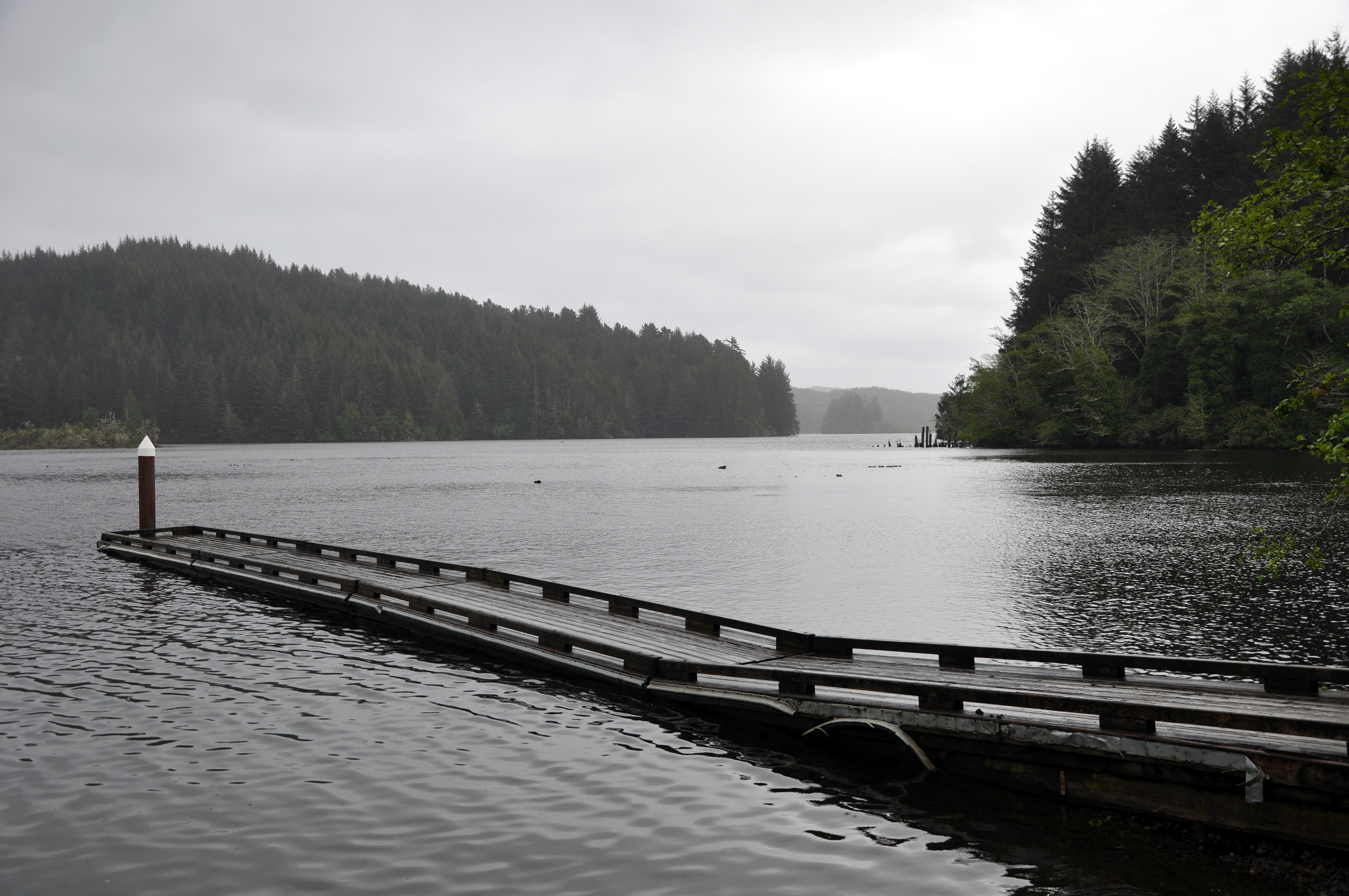
- Tahkenitch Lake from near a boat launch along U.S. Route 101

- Location within Oregon Location within the United States
- Location: Near Pacific Ocean coast in Douglas County, Oregon
- Coordinates: 43°48′26″N 124°09′01″W
- Type: Natural, permanent, mesotrophic
- Primary inflows: Fivemile and Leitel creeks
- Primary outflows: Tahkenitch Creek
- Catchment area: 34 square miles (88 km^{2})
- Basin countries: United States
- Surface area: 2,118 acres (857 ha)
- Average depth: 11 feet (3.4 m)
- Max. depth: 23 feet (7.0 m)
- Water volume: 18,200 acre-feet (22,400,000 m^{3})
- Residence time: 2 months
- Shore length^{1}: 29 miles (47 km)
- Surface elevation: 20 feet (6 m)
- Islands: Weed, Jewitt
- ^{1} Shore length is not a well-defined measure.

Tahkenitch Lake (tak' ə nich), at 2,118 acres (857 ha), is one of the larger lakes along the coast of the U.S. state of Oregon. Fed by runoff from a basin of about 34 square miles (88 km^{2}), it lies east of U.S. Route 101 in Douglas County between Florence and Reedsport. Its name comes from a Lower Umpqua (Siuslaw) placename meaning "having arms running out like a crab".

== Geology ==
Tahkenitch Lake, like its immediate neighbor to the north, Siltcoos Lake, was formed during and after the Pleistocene when melting glaciers caused a rise in sea level that drowned the lower reaches of Oregon's coastal rivers. Big rivers like the Umpqua, south of Tahkenitch Lake, formed large estuaries. The mouths of smaller streams filled with sand and sediment, which eventually created dunes. Tahkenitch, Siltcoos, Woahink, and other nearby lakes formed behind these dunes. Many centuries later, the lakes remain at elevations somewhat above the lower sea of the early 21st-century. The surface of Tahkenitch is about 20 feet (6 m) above sea level.

== Physical description ==
Fed mainly by Fivemile and Leitel creeks and several smaller streams, including Elbow Lake, Mallard, and John Sims creeks, the lake is mostly shallow. The average depth is about 11 feet (3.4 m), and the maximum depth is 23 feet (7.0 m). Water leaves the lake at its west end via Tahkenitch Creek. The creek passes under Route 101 into the Oregon Dunes National Recreation Area west of the lake and meanders less than a mile into the Pacific. Of the creeks that enter the lake, only Fivemile Creek has named tributaries: Perkins, Harry, and Bell creeks.

A low dam at the west end of the lake was originally built to maintain a dependable supply of fresh water for a pulp mill in Gardiner. The lake's shape is dendritic, and several of its branches have names. Starting at the dam, the named branches in a clockwise progression around the lake are Shag Arm, Deer Arm, Big Arm, Catfish Cove, North Arm, Bear Trap Arm, Spike Arm, Fivemile Arm, Dismal Swamp, Cleves Cove, Cherry Arm, Mallard Arm, Bombard Bay, Bedolf Arm, and Bass Arms. The lake's two named islands are Weed and Jewitt, both toward the west end of the lake. Toward the east end, Leitel Marsh extends about 2 miles (3 km) beyond the lake, and Fivemile Marsh extends about twice as far.

== Flora and fauna ==
Most of the lake's basin consists of forest land dominated by Douglas fir, spruce, alder, and a variety of shrubs. About half of these forests have been logged at one time or another.

Fish in the lake include yellow perch, catfish, bluegill, smallmouth and largemouth bass, stocked rainbow trout and cutthroat trout, and a few coho salmon and steelhead (ocean-going rainbow trout). Heavy brush prevents sport fishing from the shore, but fishing from boats is feasible. Off Highway 101 are two public boat ramps and the Tahkenitch Landing Campground. A recreational vehicle (RV) resort at the lake rents boats and fishing tackle.

Brazilian waterweed limits the lake's usefulness. The weed, which has formed a dense mat over most of the lake bottom, hampers swimming, boating, and fishing. Introduced to the lake in the 1930s, it has resisted all attempts to control it.

== See also ==
- List of lakes in Oregon
