= Westlake, Oregon =

Unincorporated community in the state of Oregon, United States

- Unincorporated community
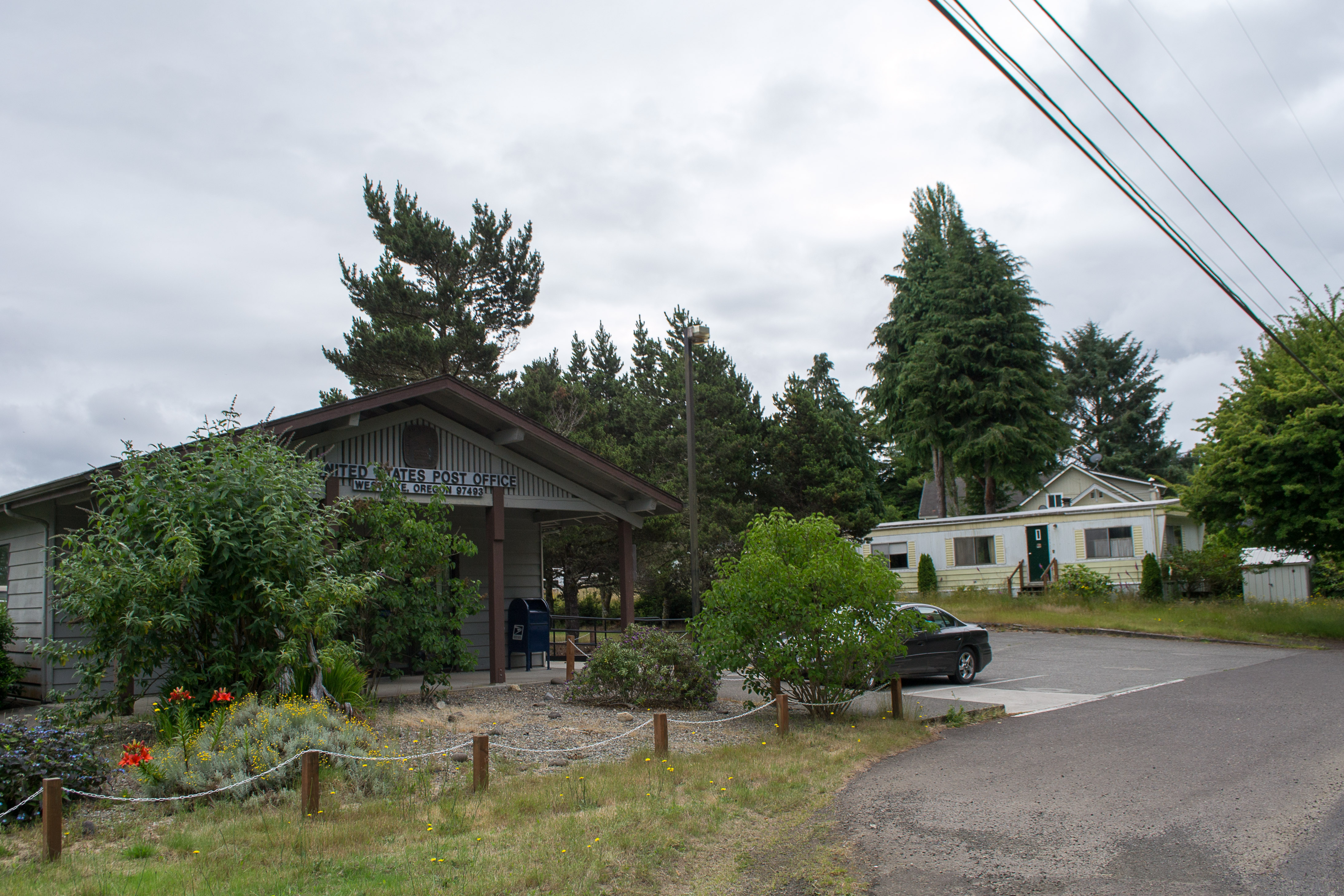
- The post office in Westlake, Oregon

- Location within Oregon Location within the United States
- Coordinates: 43°52′59″N 124°06′54″W
- Country: United States
- State: Oregon
- County: Lane
- Elevation: 23 ft (7.0 m)
- Time zone: UTC-8 (Pacific (PST))
  - Summer (DST): UTC-7 (PDT)
- ZIP code: 97493
- Area codes: 458 and 541
- GNIS feature ID: 1639345

Westlake is an unincorporated community on Siltcoos Lake in Lane County, Oregon, United States, approximately seven miles south of Florence. Its area is included in the city limits of the incorporated city of Dunes City. The post office in Dunes City is named "Westlake", and most addresses in Dunes City have a Florence mailing address and are not in the area historically associated with Westlake.

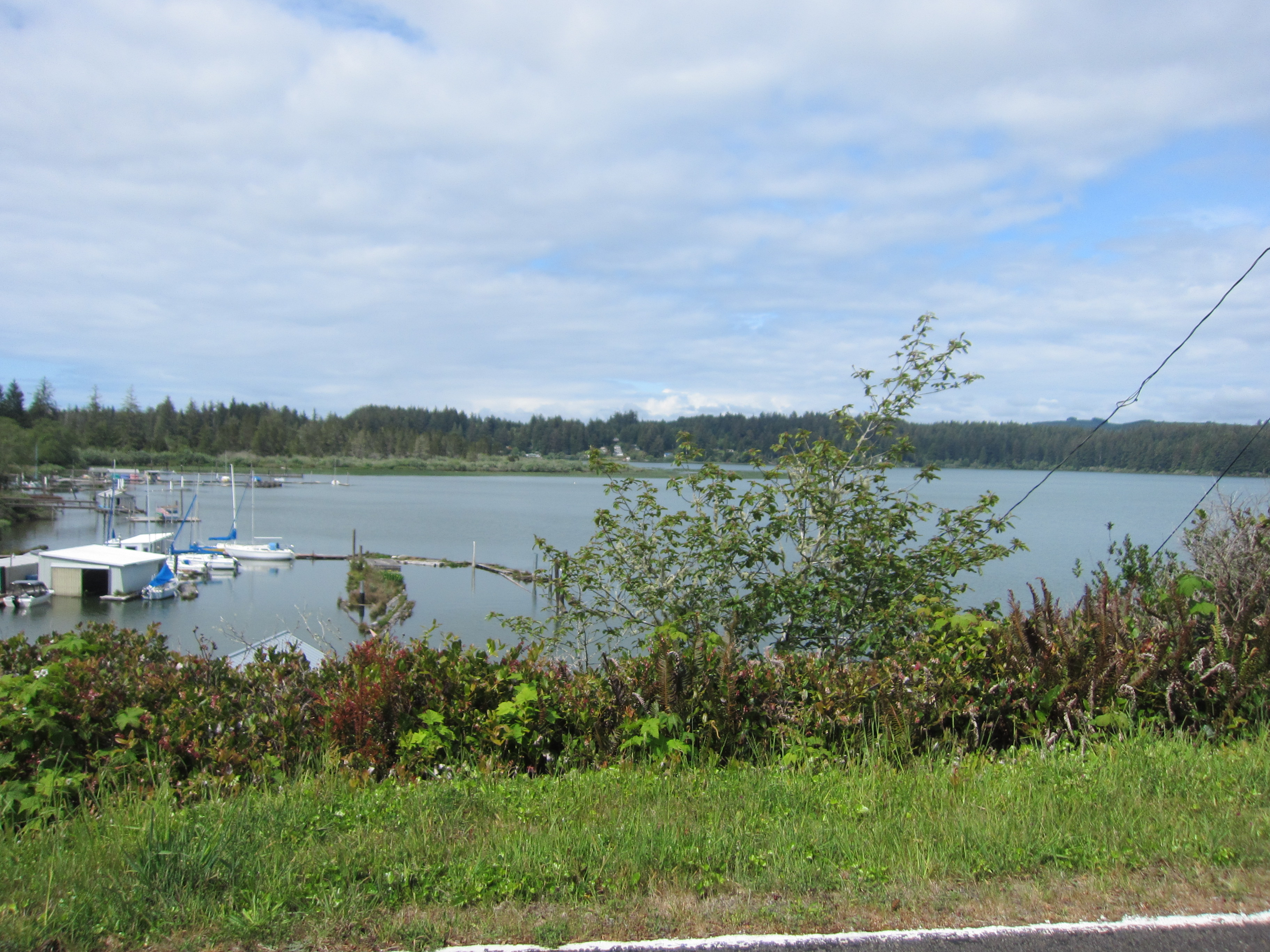
Siltcoos Lake, view from Westlake
