= Jessie M. Honeyman Memorial State Park =

State park in Oregon, United States

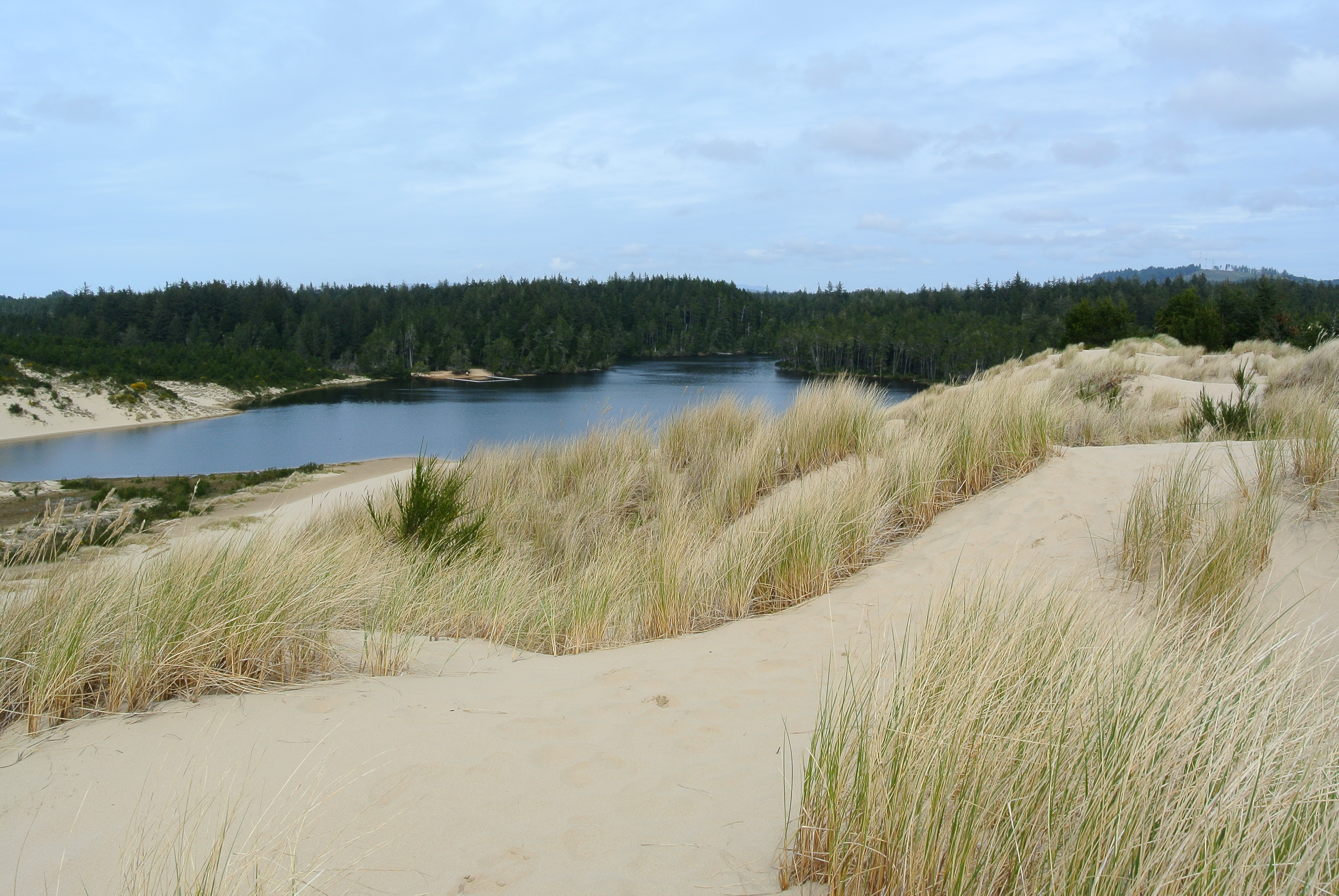
- Cleawox Lake from dunes in the park

- Location within Oregon Location within the United States
- Type: Public, state
- Location: Lane County, Oregon
- Nearest city: Florence
- Coordinates: 43°55′44″N 124°06′25″W
- Operator: Oregon Parks and Recreation Department
- Jessie M. Honeyman Memorial State Park Historic District
- U.S. National Register of Historic Places
- Built: 1936 to 1941
- Built by: Civilian Conservation Corps
- NRHP reference No.: 84000473
- Added to NRHP: November 28, 1984

Jessie M. Honeyman Memorial State Park, also known simply as Honeyman State Park, is in Lane County of the U.S. state of Oregon. It lies 3 miles (5 km) south of Florence along Highway 101, the coastal highway. The 27,212-acre (11,012 ha) Oregon Dunes National Recreation Area adjoins the park to the west. Many amenities are available, including over 200 campsites, all-terrain vehicle access, swimming, fishing and sandboarding.

Originally named Camp Woahink, the park was built by the Civilian Conservation Corps (CCC), and was later renamed in honor Jessie M. Honeyman (1852–1948) of Portland. As president of the Oregon Roadside Council, Honeyman worked with Samuel Boardman, Oregon's first Superintendent of State Parks in the 1920s and 1930s, to preserve Oregon coastal lands.

Several of the structures built by the CCC, including the camp store, three picnic shelters, and the administrative building, comprise the Jessie M. Honeyman Memorial State Park Historic District. The campground was added in the 1950s. The Lake Woahink Seaplane Base is on Woahink Lake, southeast of the park, and Camp Cleawox, a Girl Scout camp, is across Cleawox Lake and northwest of the park.

== Climate ==
Honeyman State Park has a warm-summer Mediterranean climate (Köppen Csb).

Climate data for Honeyman State Park (1991–2020 normals, extremes 1971–present)
Month	Jan	Feb	Mar	Apr	May	Jun	Jul	Aug	Sep	Oct	Nov	Dec	Year
Record high °F (°C)	65 (18)	75 (24)	78 (26)	86 (30)	90 (32)	88 (31)	92 (33)	93 (34)	95 (35)	92 (33)	69 (21)	65 (18)	95 (35)
Mean maximum °F (°C)	58.8 (14.9)	62.3 (16.8)	66.0 (18.9)	71.5 (21.9)	75.7 (24.3)	75.5 (24.2)	76.7 (24.8)	78.2 (25.7)	82.2 (27.9)	74.1 (23.4)	62.6 (17.0)	58.1 (14.5)	86.7 (30.4)
Mean daily maximum °F (°C)	48.7 (9.3)	50.8 (10.4)	53.0 (11.7)	56.6 (13.7)	60.1 (15.6)	63.7 (17.6)	67.0 (19.4)	67.1 (19.5)	66.2 (19.0)	59.9 (15.5)	52.4 (11.3)	48.0 (8.9)	57.8 (14.3)
Daily mean °F (°C)	43.7 (6.5)	44.6 (7.0)	46.1 (7.8)	49.2 (9.6)	52.7 (11.5)	56.2 (13.4)	58.9 (14.9)	59.1 (15.1)	57.9 (14.4)	52.8 (11.6)	47.0 (8.3)	43.0 (6.1)	50.9 (10.5)
Mean daily minimum °F (°C)	38.7 (3.7)	38.4 (3.6)	39.1 (3.9)	41.8 (5.4)	45.2 (7.3)	48.7 (9.3)	50.8 (10.4)	51.1 (10.6)	49.6 (9.8)	45.7 (7.6)	41.6 (5.3)	37.9 (3.3)	44.1 (6.7)
Mean minimum °F (°C)	28.6 (−1.9)	28.5 (−1.9)	29.9 (−1.2)	32.7 (0.4)	36.9 (2.7)	41.1 (5.1)	44.1 (6.7)	44.6 (7.0)	42.1 (5.6)	35.6 (2.0)	30.7 (−0.7)	28.1 (−2.2)	24.3 (−4.3)
Record low °F (°C)	14 (−10)	13 (−11)	19 (−7)	29 (−2)	31 (−1)	27 (−3)	33 (1)	39 (4)	30 (−1)	24 (−4)	20 (−7)	9 (−13)	9 (−13)
Average precipitation inches (mm)	10.85 (276)	7.97 (202)	8.18 (208)	5.81 (148)	3.09 (78)	2.47 (63)	0.56 (14)	0.76 (19)	2.01 (51)	5.25 (133)	9.98 (253)	11.19 (284)	68.12 (1,730)
Average snowfall inches (cm)	0.1 (0.25)	0.4 (1.0)	0.0 (0.0)	0.0 (0.0)	0.0 (0.0)	0.0 (0.0)	0.0 (0.0)	0.0 (0.0)	0.0 (0.0)	0.0 (0.0)	0.0 (0.0)	0.2 (0.51)	0.7 (1.8)
Average precipitation days (≥ 0.01 in)	18.2	17.1	18.3	14.7	10.8	7.4	2.3	3.2	5.4	11.1	18.7	18.9	146.1
Average snowy days (≥ 0.1 in)	0.1	0.1	0.0	0.0	0.0	0.0	0.0	0.0	0.0	0.0	0.0	0.1	0.3
Source 1: NOAA
Source 2: WRCC (snowfall)

== Gallery ==
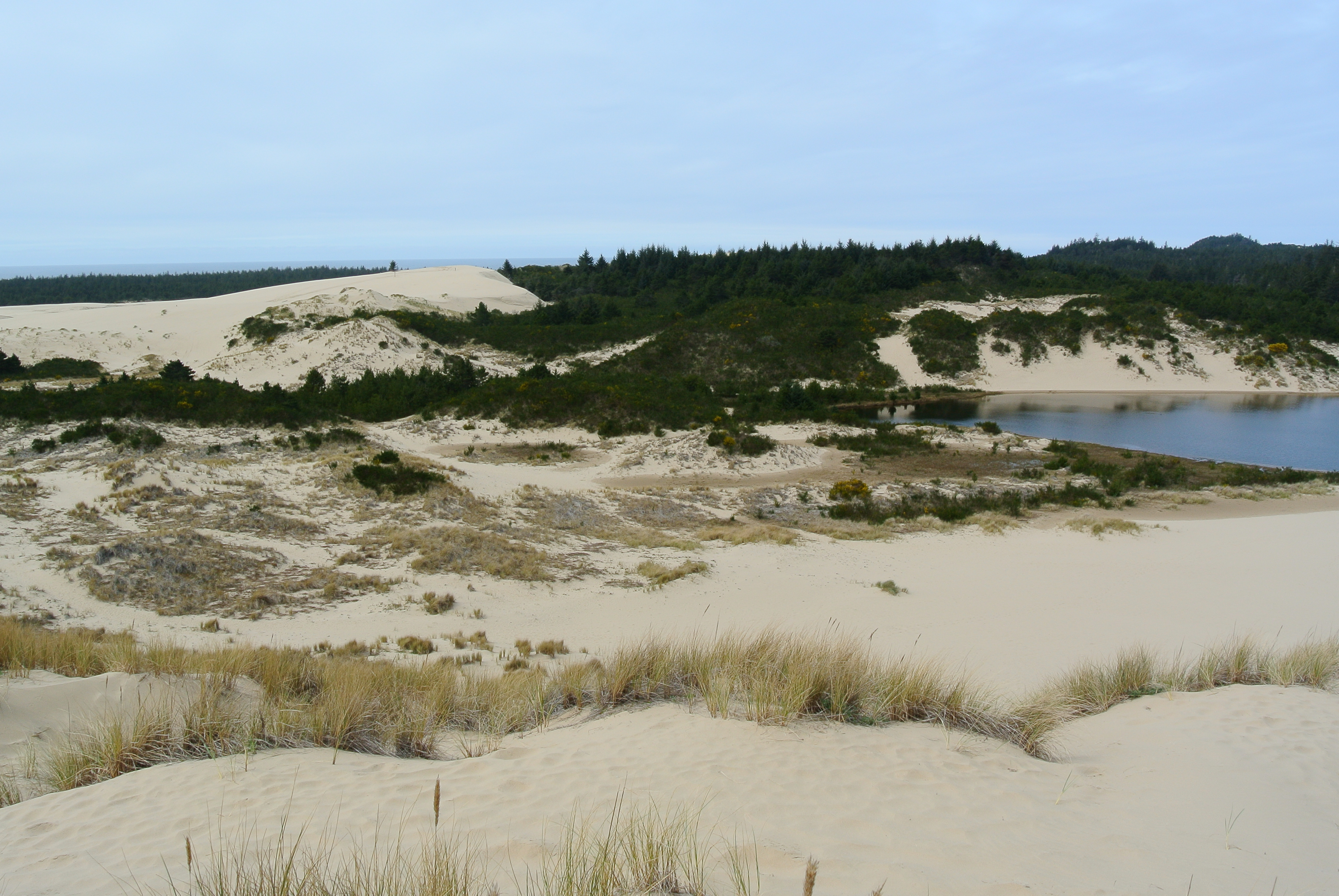
Sand dunes and part of Cleawox Lake, Pacific Ocean in the background

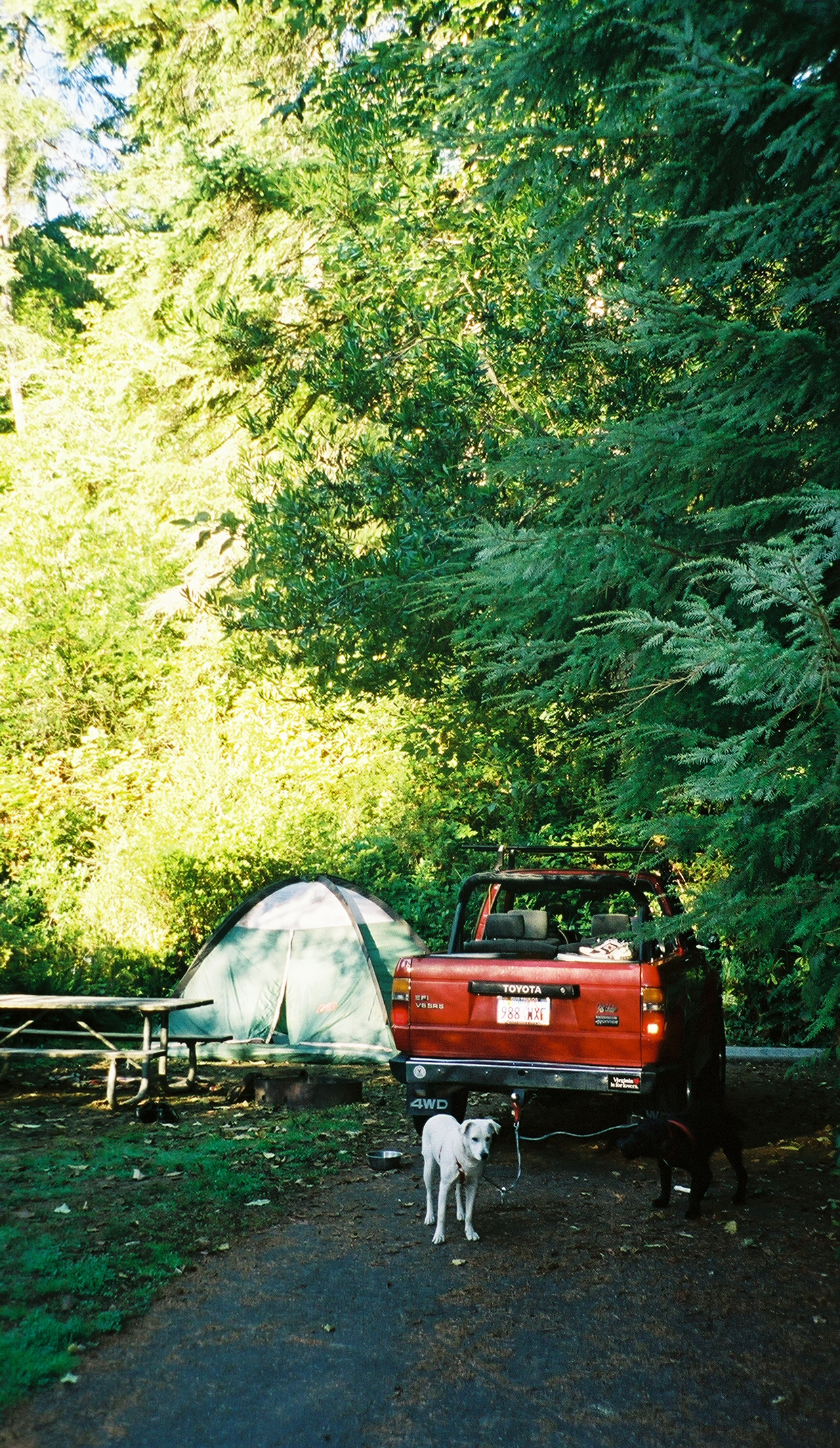
A campsite in the park

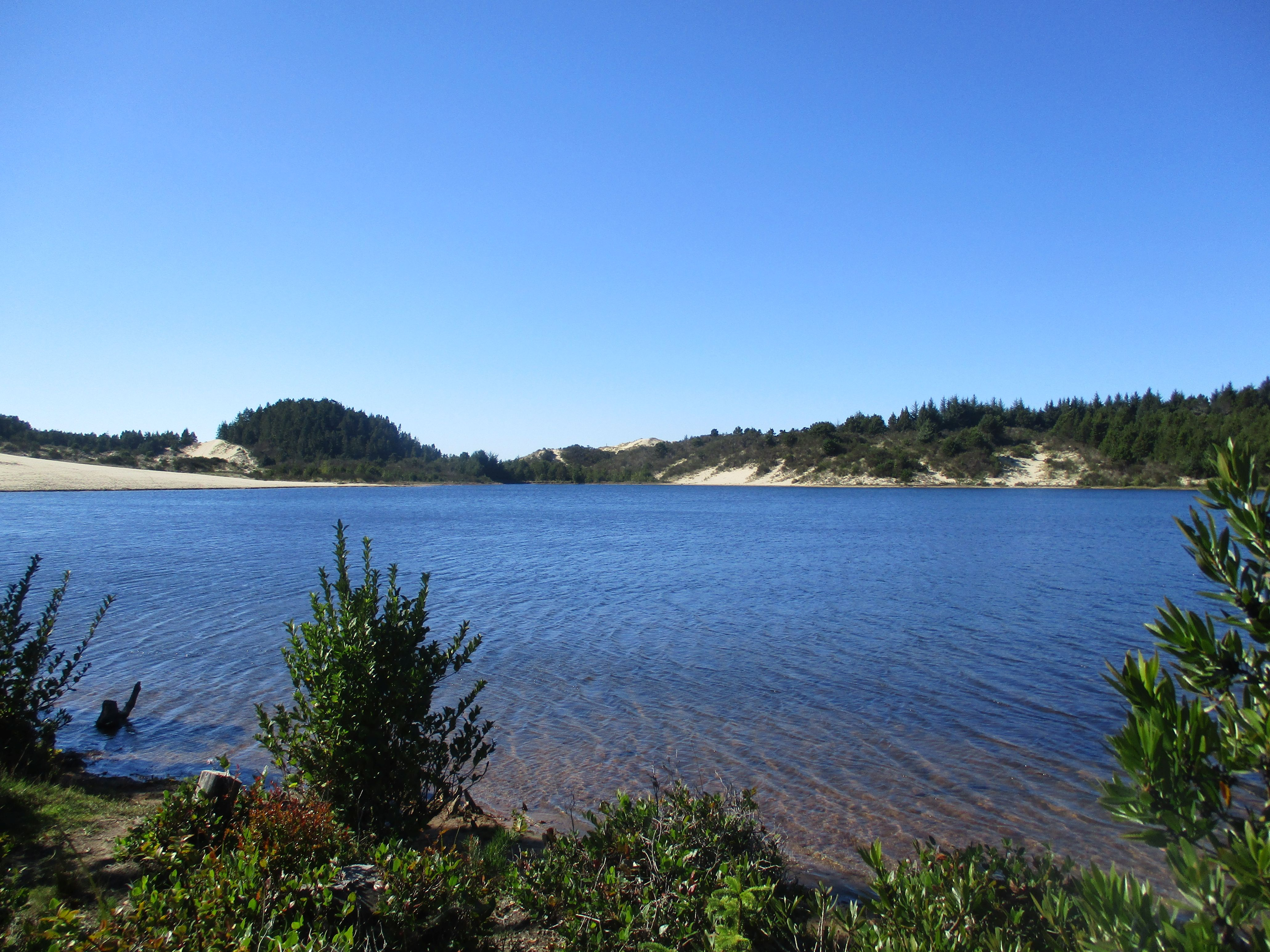
Cleawox Lake

Park plaque

== See also ==
- List of Oregon state parks
