= Lake Woahink Seaplane Base =

- IATA: none; ICAO: none; FAA LID: 1O0

Summary
- Airport type: Public
- Operator: M & M Seaplane Opers.
- Location: Florence, Oregon
- Elevation AMSL: 39 ft / 12 m
- Coordinates: 43°54′15″N 124°06′53″W
- Interactive map of Lake Woahink Seaplane Base

Runways
Direction	Length		Surface
Direction	ft	m	Surface
N/S	9,000	2,743	Water
NW/SE	3,200	975	Water

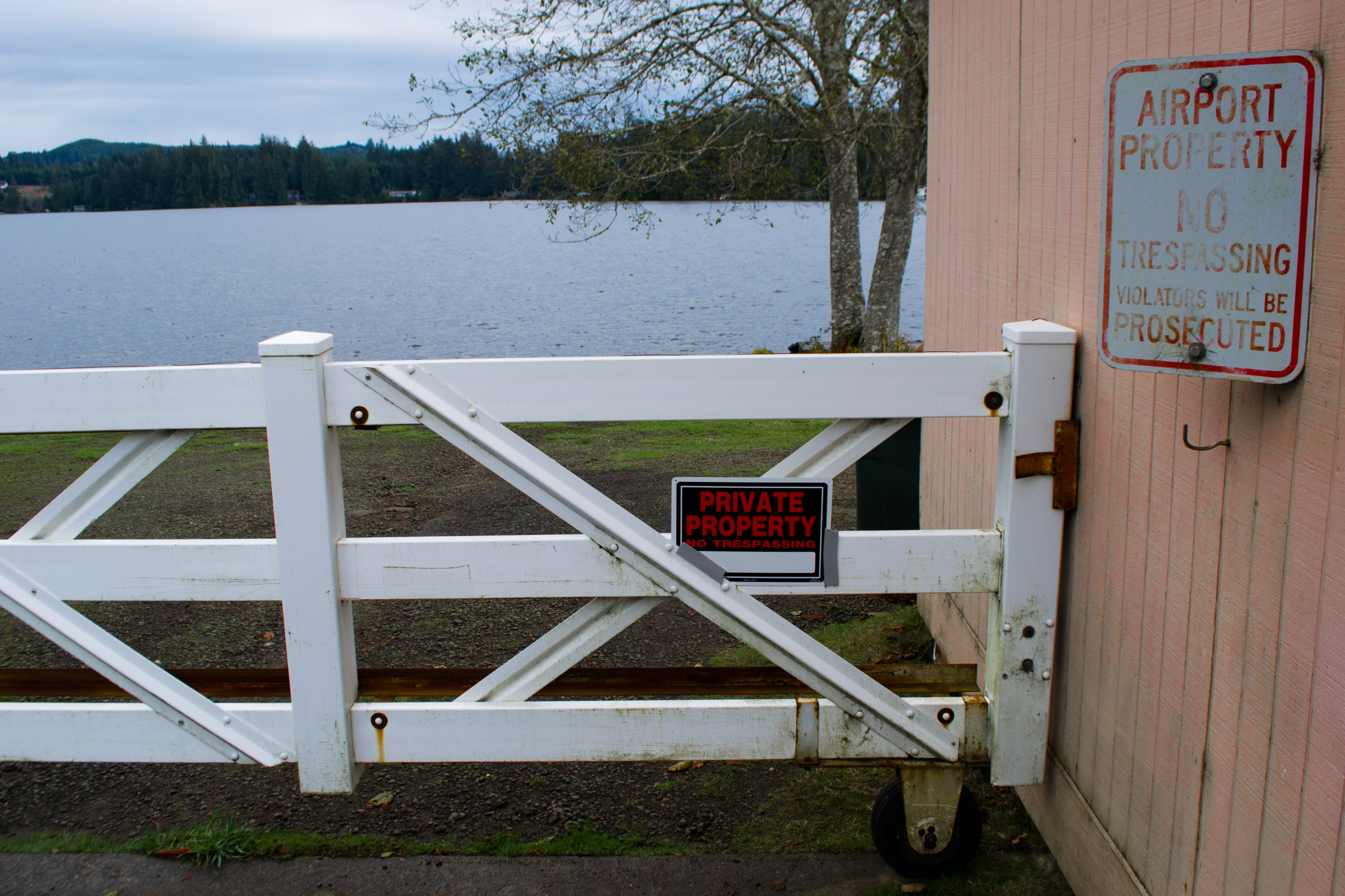

Lake Woahink Seaplane Base (FAA LID: 1O0) is a public seaplane base located at Woahink Lake, 4 miles (6.4 km) south of the city of Florence in Lane County, in the U.S. state of Oregon.
