= Woahink Lake =

Lake in Oregon, United States

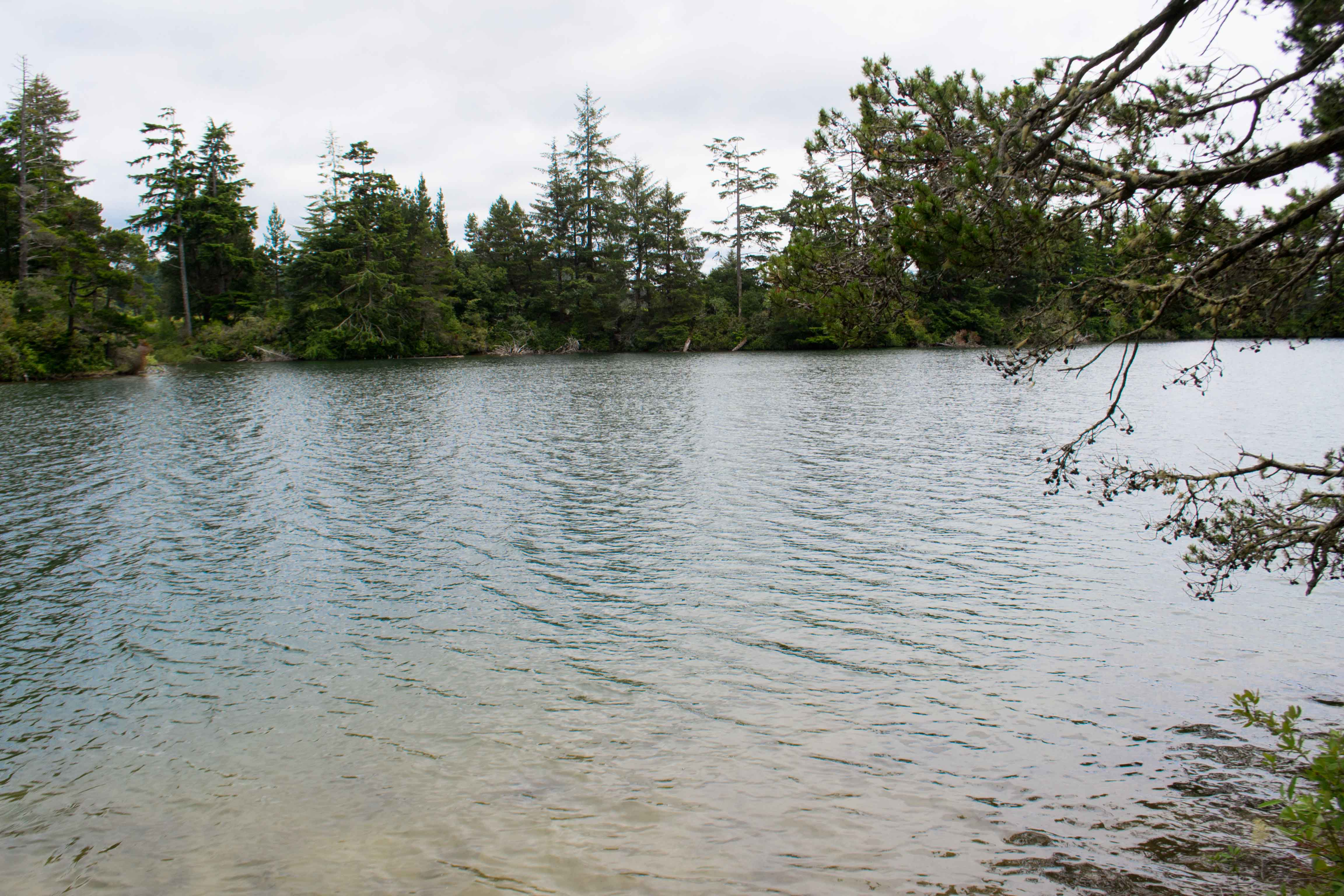

- Location within Oregon Location within the United States
- Location: Near Pacific Ocean coast in Lane County, Oregon
- Coordinates: 43°54′55″N 124°06′01″W
- Type: Natural, permanent, oligotrophic
- Primary outflows: Woahink Creek
- Catchment area: 7 square miles (18 km^{2})
- Basin countries: United States
- Surface area: 820 acres (330 ha)
- Average depth: 33 feet (10 m)
- Max. depth: 74 feet (23 m)
- Water volume: 26,700 acre-feet (32,900,000 m^{3})
- Residence time: 1.2 years
- Shore length^{1}: 14 miles (23 km)
- Surface elevation: 43 feet (13 m)
- Settlements: North Beach, Dunes City
- ^{1} Shore length is not a well-defined measure.

Woahink Lake (hō' hingk) extends further below sea level than any other lake dammed by sand dunes along the coast of the U.S. state of Oregon. The lake fills a depression in the Siltcoos River watershed about 3 miles (5 km) from the Pacific Ocean south of Florence along U.S. Route 101. The lowest point of the lake, which is up to 74 feet (23 m) deep, is about 36 feet (11 m) below sea level. The lake drains south to Siltcoos Lake via Woahink Creek. The lake's name may derive from the Siuslaw language.

== Geology ==
Woahink Lake is a former estuary that has been blocked by sand dunes. The lake formed during a rise in sea level during deglaciation, when sand dunes were emplaced, blocking the flow of the lower reaches of several of Oregon's coastal rivers. A sediment core from Woahink Lake revealed that a dune was emplaced, changing the estuary to a lake, 7400 years ago, which was then breached, then formed again before 5400 years ago. Sand for the dune sheets was derived from regional rivers. Unlike the downstream Siltcoos Lake, which is relatively shallow, Woahink Lake fills a narrow steep-walled depression that likely had a different outlet when it was an estuary.

== Watershed ==
Covering about 7 square miles (18 km^{2}), Woahink Lake's drainage basin lies between a dune complex, part of Oregon Dunes National Recreation Area, on the west and foothills of the Oregon Coast Range on the east. U.S. Route 101 runs along the west side of the lake. Jessie M. Honeyman Memorial State Park borders the northwest corner of the lake, and the unincorporated community of North Beach lies between Woahink and Siltcoos lakes. North Beach and other residential areas near the lake are part of Dunes City. Except for the state park, most of the shoreline and the land in the basin is privately owned. Rainfall averages 80 inches (2,000 mm) a year, and coniferous forest covers much of the undeveloped land.

== Recreation ==
The lake is popular for a variety of activities, including fishing. Species include largemouth bass, rainbow and coastal cutthroat trout, yellow perch, and others. The part of the state park on the east side of the highway near Woahink Lake has boat ramps, a roped-off swimming area, group tent camps, picnic areas, and a meeting hall. Lake Woahink Seaplane Base is located at the lake. Base headquarters are in Florence.

== See also ==
- List of lakes in Oregon
