= Siltcoos Lake =

Lake in Oregon, United States

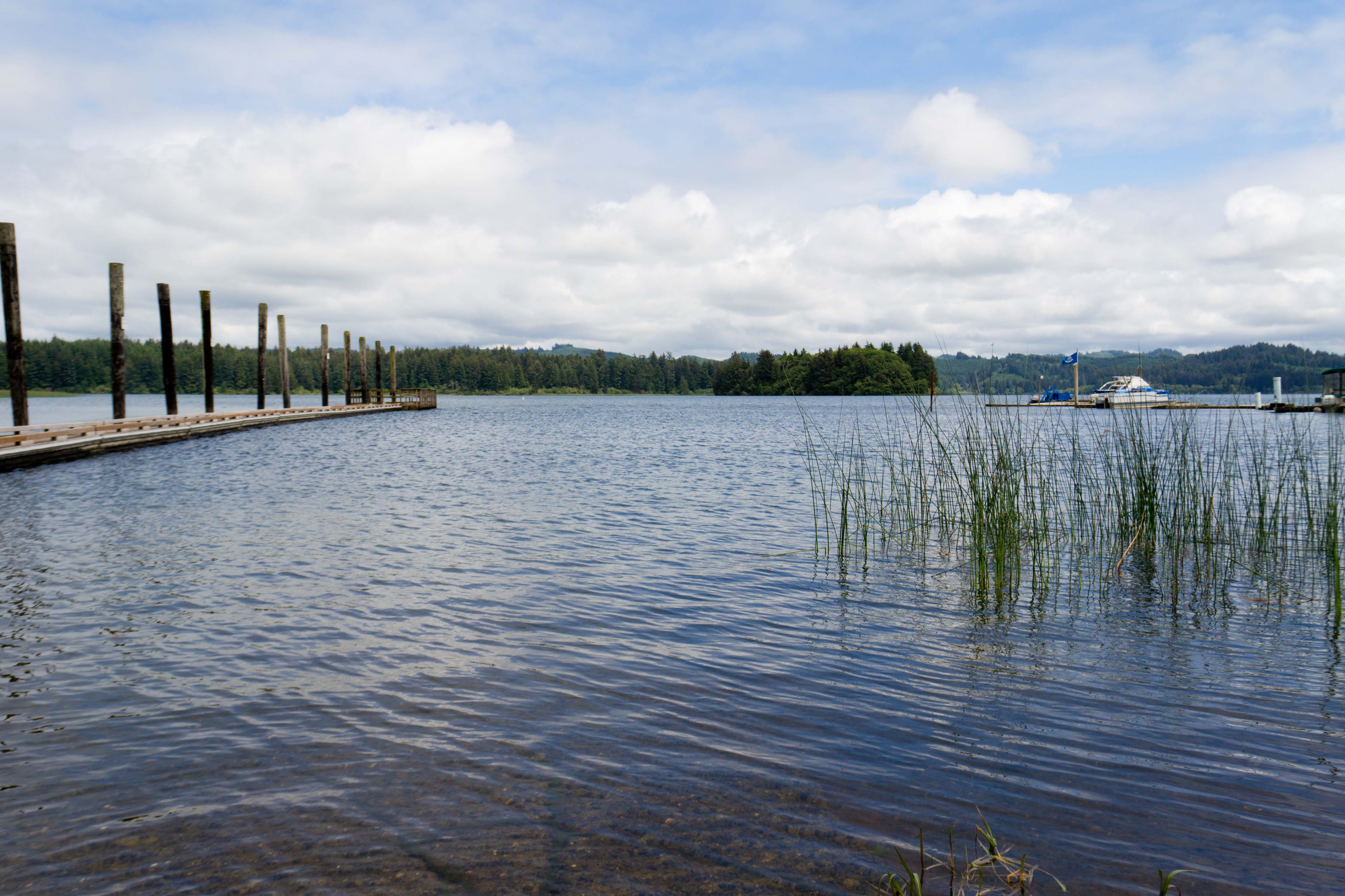
- View from Westlake Park

- Location within Oregon Location within the United States
- Location: Near Pacific Ocean coast in Douglas and Lane counties, Oregon
- Coordinates: 43°52′54″N 124°06′45″W
- Type: Natural, permanent, eutrophic
- Primary inflows: Woahink, Fiddle, Maple, and Lane creeks
- Primary outflows: Siltcoos River
- Catchment area: 68 square miles (180 km^{2})
- Basin countries: United States
- Surface area: 3,164 acres (1,280 ha)
- Average depth: 11 feet (3.4 m)
- Max. depth: 22 feet (6.7 m)
- Water volume: 33,900 acre-feet (41,800,000 m^{3})
- Residence time: 2 months
- Shore length^{1}: 28 miles (45 km)
- Surface elevation: 13 feet (4.0 m)
- Islands: Booth, Reed (Webber), Jernigan (Goat), Boy Scout, Butterfly, Grass,
- Settlements: Dunes City, Westlake Siltcoos, Oregon
- ^{1} Shore length is not a well-defined measure.

Siltcoos Lake (silt’-koos), at 3,164 acres (1,280 ha), is the largest lake on the Oregon Coast of the United States. Fed by runoff from a basin of about 68 square miles (180 km^{2}) in Douglas and Lane counties, it is about 7 miles (11 km) south of Florence and 0.5 miles (1 km) east of U.S. Route 101. Its name comes from a Lower Umpqua (Siuslaw) placename, a variant of which is Tsiltcoos.

The lake, with a mean elevation of 13 feet (4 m) above sea level, empties into the Siltcoos River, which meanders generally west for about 3 miles (4.8 km) to its mouth on the Pacific Ocean. A dam about a half-mile downriver regulates the lake's outflow.

== Geology and biology ==
Siltcoos Lake is a submerged remnant of a Siltcoos River delta that existed before the most recent ice age. The lake formed after melting glaciers caused a rise in sea level that drowned the lower reaches of Oregon's coastal rivers. Sediments from the sluggish rivers formed sand dunes, behind which the ancestral mouths of rivers like the Siltcoos became lakes. Nearby Woahink Lake and Tahkenitch Lake are similar remnants.

Fed mainly by four small freshwater tributaries—Woahink, Fiddle, Maple, and Lane creeks—the lake is very shallow. About 80 percent of it is less than 15 feet (4.6 m) deep, and 32 percent of it consists of shoal areas. The shallowness contributes to the lake's eutrophic nature, related to extensive populations of Elodea, Myriophyllum, and other aquatic plants. A wide variety of warm-water fish thrive in the lake, where nutrients are plentiful, but these nutrients have also led historically to troublesome algal blooms.

Some of the residents of Dunes City and nearby areas depend on the lake for drinking water. For 52 days in the fall of 2007, state and local authorities advised against domestic use of the lake water because of a dense bloom of Anabaena planktonica, a blue-green algal species that can produce toxins. The Oregon Department of Environmental Quality (DEQ) has placed the lake on its list of impaired water bodies because of its problems with algae.

== Recreation ==
Siltcoos Lake is a popular destination for fishing and is home to many warm-water species as well as transient seagoing fish such as Coho salmon and steelhead. Anglers try for bass weighing up to 10 pounds (5 kg), as well as perch, catfish, crappies, bluegill, and cutthroat trout. The state record coho salmon was caught on this lake. The state record coastal cutthroat trout was caught here in 1984 by Kay Schmidt, 6 lbs 4 oz.

Camping is available at several spots within a few miles of the lake. These include the iconic Darlings Marina and RV resort, located on North Beach of Siltcoos lake, ADA fishing resort located on Fiddle creek, Tyee Campground along the Siltcoos River; Waxmyrtle and Lagoon campgrounds, accessible from U.S. Route 101 south of the lake, and Driftwood II Campground, west of Lagoon Campground.

Siltcoos Lake Seaplane Base is located at the lake. Base headquarters are in Westlake.

== See also ==
- List of lakes in Oregon
