= Oregon Dunes National Recreation Area =

Expanse of coastal sand dunes in North America

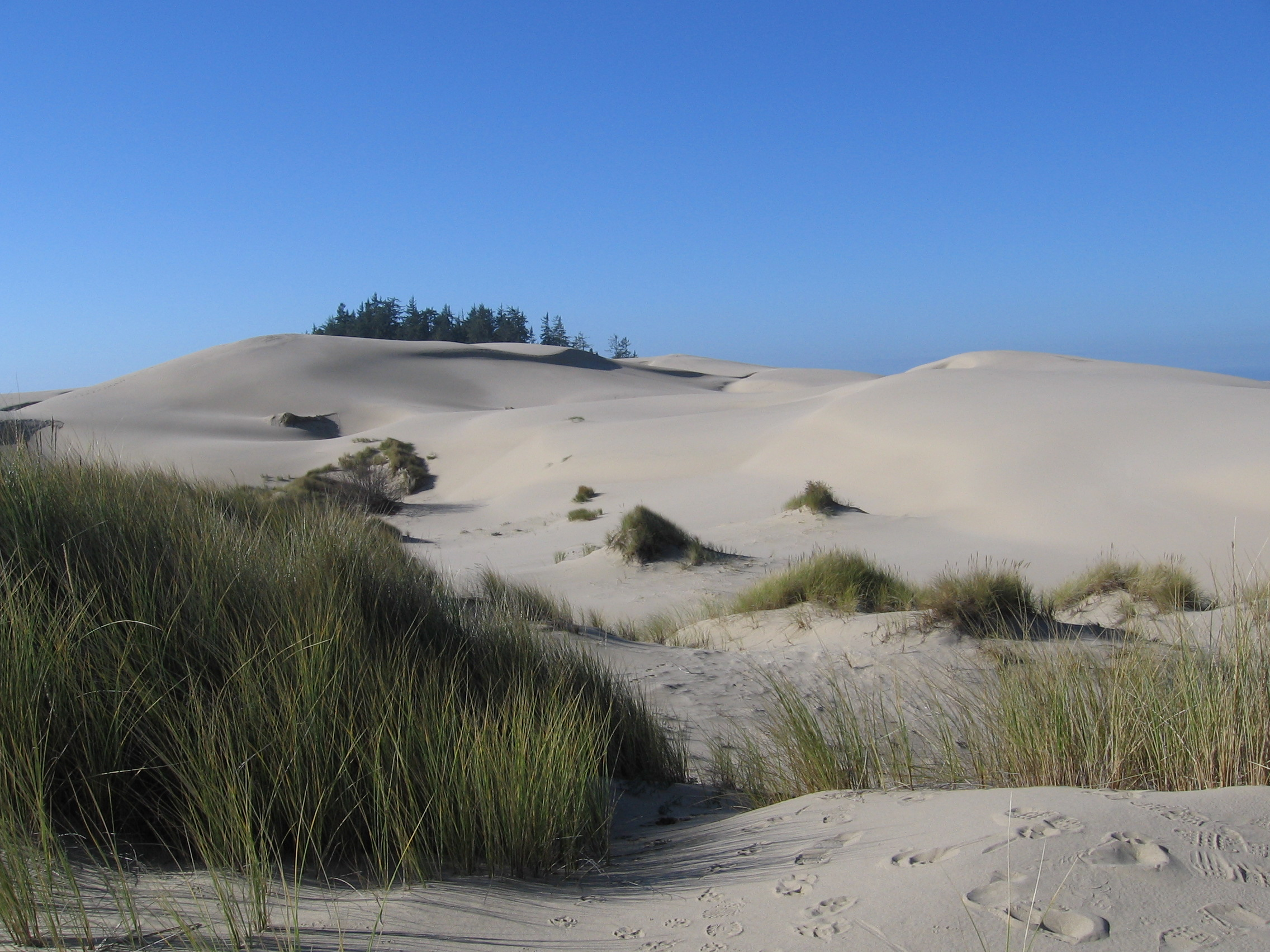
- Dunes outside Reedsport

- Location within the United States
- Location: Oregon, United States
- Nearest city: North Bend, Oregon
- Coordinates: 43°43′27″N 124°10′39″W
- Area: 31,566 acres (127.74 km^{2})
- Established: March 23, 1972
- Visitors: roughly 1,500,000 (in 2005)
- Governing body: United States Forest Service
- Website: Oregon Dunes National Recreation Area

The Oregon Dunes National Recreation Area is located on the Oregon Coast, stretching approximately 40 miles (64 km) north of the Coos River in North Bend to the Siuslaw River in Florence, and adjoining Honeyman State Park on the west. It is part of Siuslaw National Forest and is administered by the United States Forest Service.

The Oregon Dunes are a unique area of windswept sand. They are the largest expanse of coastal sand dunes in North America and one of the largest expanses of temperate coastal sand dunes in the world, with some dunes reaching 500 feet (150 m) above sea level. They are the product of millions of years of erosion by wind and rain on the Oregon Coast. There are about 7,000 acres (28 km^{2}) of sand dunes, about a fifth of the total area of the national recreation area. The Oregon Dunes National Recreation Area provides numerous recreational activities, including off-highway vehicle (OHV) use, hiking, fishing, canoeing, horseback riding, and camping. The Carter Dunes Trail and Oregon Dunes Day Use provide forest access for disabled people.

Frank Herbert's science-fiction novel Dune was partly inspired by the author's research on and fascination with the area.

== History ==
The Oregon Dunes are over 100,000 years old and stretch approximately 40 miles (64 km). The youngest dunes, which are the closest to the ocean, began forming about 7,000 years ago. Studies of individual sand grains show that these sands were carried down from the mountains by the Umpqua, Siuslaw, and other smaller rivers.

Senator Richard L. Neuberger introduced a bill to establish a national seashore at the Oregon Dunes in 1959, but it was opposed by governor Mark Hatfield and several local organizations. It would have also included the Sea Lion Caves. A bill reintroduced by Congressman Robert B. Duncan in 1963 unanimously passed the Senate Interior Committee, but Senator Wayne Morse opposed provisions of the bill that increased environmental protections by restricting property uses, and the Forest Service did not wish to see it transferred to the National Park Service. Pub. L. 92–260, sponsored by Congressman John R. Dellenback, was enacted in 1972, protecting 32,186 acres (13,025 ha) as the Oregon Dunes National Recreation Area. Dellenback included a local advisory council, restricted mineral extraction, and removed some residential property to gain support and cosponsorship of Senators Hatfield and Bob Packwood. The national recreation area was dedicated on July 15, 1972, at Eel Creek Campground with the presence of Forest Service chief John McQuire, Governor Tom McCall, Hatfield, and Dellenback. The trail beginning there is now named after Dellenback.

About an eighth of the area is private inholdings, leaving 27,212 acres (110.12 km^{2}) owned by the Forest Service.

== Geology ==
The sand dunes were formed by wind and water over time. The dune formation is mainly dependent on the wind. In the summer the wind blows from the north and northwest at 12–16 miles per hour (19–26 km/h). Mountain barriers near the coast deflect the wind currents, forming the sand into many different shapes. In the winter the winds are much slower (except during storms when the winds can reach up to 100 miles per hour (160 km/h)), coming from the south and southwest. These winds move large amounts of sand, reshaping the dunes' structure. Water also plays a role in dune formation. Waves and tides dredge sand from the ocean floor and deposit it onto the beaches, where the wind takes over. The sands are about 45% quartz and 45% feldspar.

The water currents also create marshy areas where standing water is several feet deep. Upward pressure causes the sand grains to become saturated and float. This process results in quicksand. Quicksand is found in the low, unvegetated areas between the dunes.

The barrage lakes are the largest lakes in Oregon Dunes National Recreation Area. They were formed when streams flowing west from the Coast Range foothills were dammed up by the rapidly developing dunes.

== Plants and animals ==
=== Plants ===
Stable native plant species are vital to the success of the dunes ecosystem. Several native plants and plant groups have been identified as crucial and are part of active management and conservation efforts. These plants include red fescue, Port Orford cedar, evergreen huckleberry, seashore bluegrass, shore pine, hairy manzanita, bearberry, bog blueberry, tufted hairgrass, slough sedge, Sitka spruce, and skunk cabbage.

Original native plant species were drastically reduced over the years due to the planting of European beachgrass, Scotch broom and shore pine for sand stabilization that occurred from 1910 through 1979.

=== Birds ===
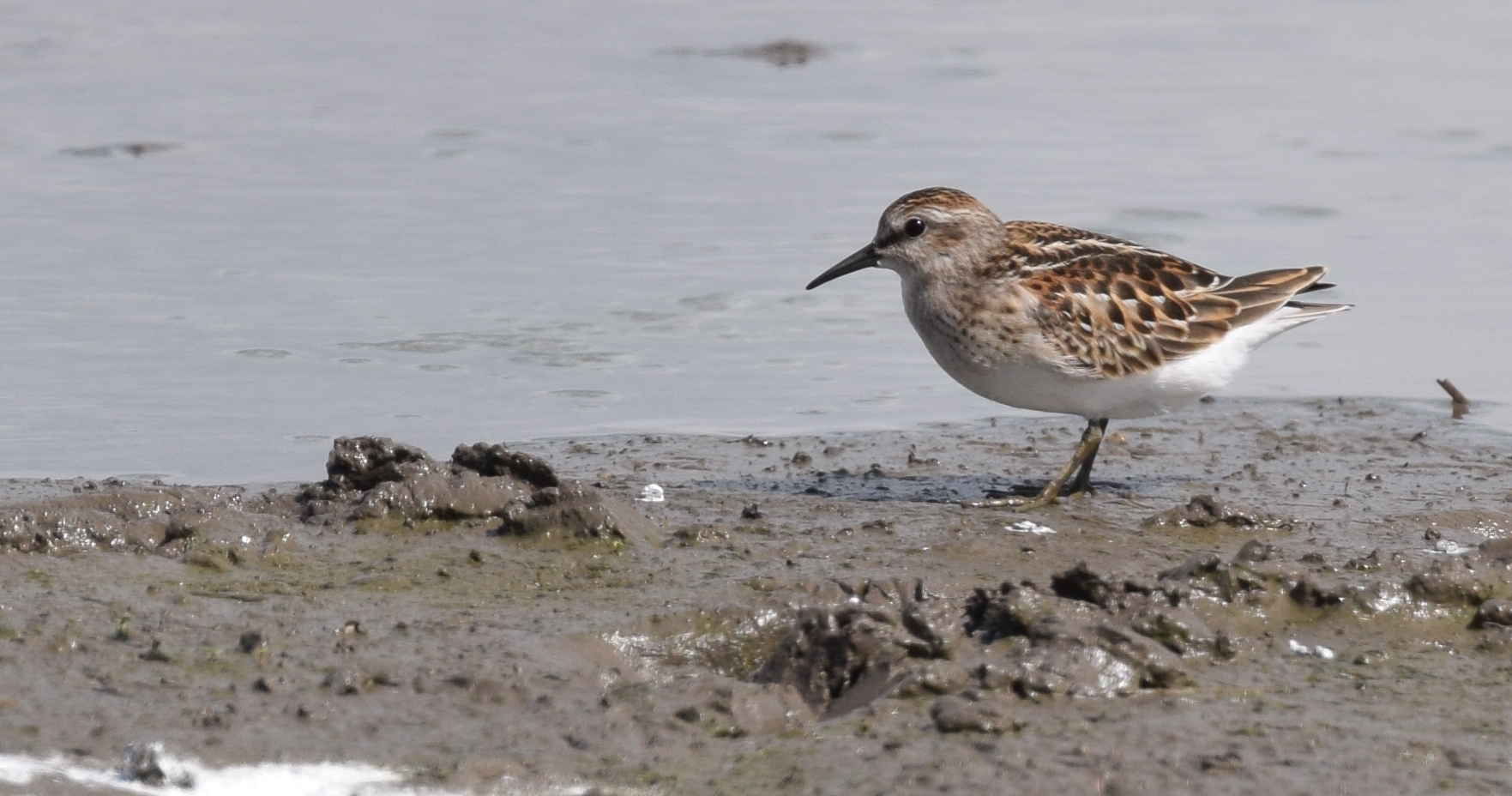
Least sandpiper

Many species of birds live in the varied habitats of the Oregon Dunes National Recreation Area. The South Jetty area includes beach, marsh, and coastal wetlands where the tundra swan, marsh wren, Canada goose, yellow-rumped warbler, red-tailed hawk, sanderling, long-billed curlew, dunlin, and least sandpiper make their home. The great blue heron, American bittern, green heron, Virginia rail, cinnamon teal, common yellowthroat, common merganser, belted kingfisher, snowy plover, bald eagle, and osprey live along the Siticoos area by the Waxmyrtle Trail. The Eel Creek area includes many shore pines and provides shelter to the pine siskin, chestnut-backed chickadee, Swainson's thrush, wrentit, northern flicker, red crossbill, olive-sided flycatcher, and Anna's hummingbird. The white-tailed kite, northern harrier, violet-green swallow, downy woodpecker, orange-crowned warbler, yellow warbler, black-throated gray warbler, Townsend’s warbler, hermit warbler, great horned owl, and great egret have been sighted in the Horsefalls area.

==== Western snowy plover ====
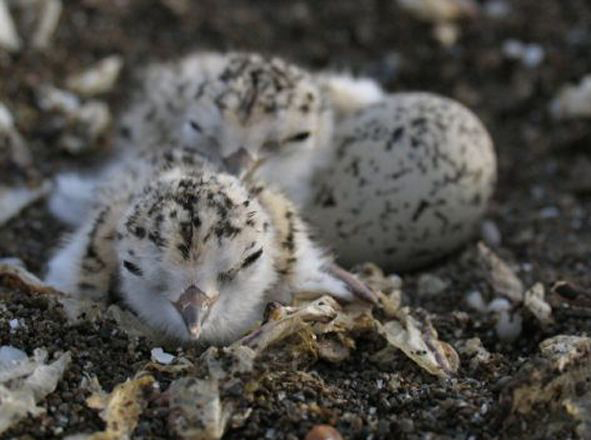
Western snowy plover chicks

The western snowy plover uses the Oregon Dunes National Recreation Area as a nesting site. In 1993, it was identified as a threatened species by the US Fish and Wildlife Service, with only 68 birds remaining in Oregon. Multiple agencies used a multi-pronged approach to protect the plovers and increase their numbers. Techniques included restoring the plover habitat along the sand dunes by removing invasive beach grasses and maintaining the appropriate structures optimal for nest building. Protection of nesting sites is achieved by education, signage, and beach restrictions during the nesting season from March 15 through September 15. When necessary, these restrictions are enforced by police officers. Other techniques include removal of invasive predators and accurate population monitoring. As of 2012, the number of plovers had increased to 403 birds.

== Oregon Dunes Restoration Collaborative ==
The Oregon Dunes Restoration Collaborative is an organization that works with numerous government entities to preserve and restore the dunes. The group, formed in 2014, is engaged in efforts to combat the spread of invasive plant species that consume a large portion of the dunes. The invasive species seen today are a result of a twentieth-century effort by land managers to stabilize the dunes by planting grasses. While these grasses were successful in stabilizing the dunes, they have flourished to the point where they interfere with the natural shaping of dunes.

Today the group, along with the United States Forest Service, is creating prioritization plans, locating funding sources, and raising public awareness of the project. The group encourages individuals to volunteer in engagement and stewardship initiatives around the dunes, employ sustainable recreation practices while visiting the dunes, and engage others about the current issues involving the dunes.

== Off-highway vehicle use ==
The Oregon Dunes National Recreation Area is among the top United States Forest Service sites in the country for off-highway vehicle (OHV) use. Until the first management plan was adopted in 1979, 91% of the site was available for the use of OHVs. A revised 1994 Recreation Use Plan restricted the use of OHVs to only 31% of the total site, split between two large units or management areas. As of 2018, visitors can use the North, Middle, and South OHV riding areas.

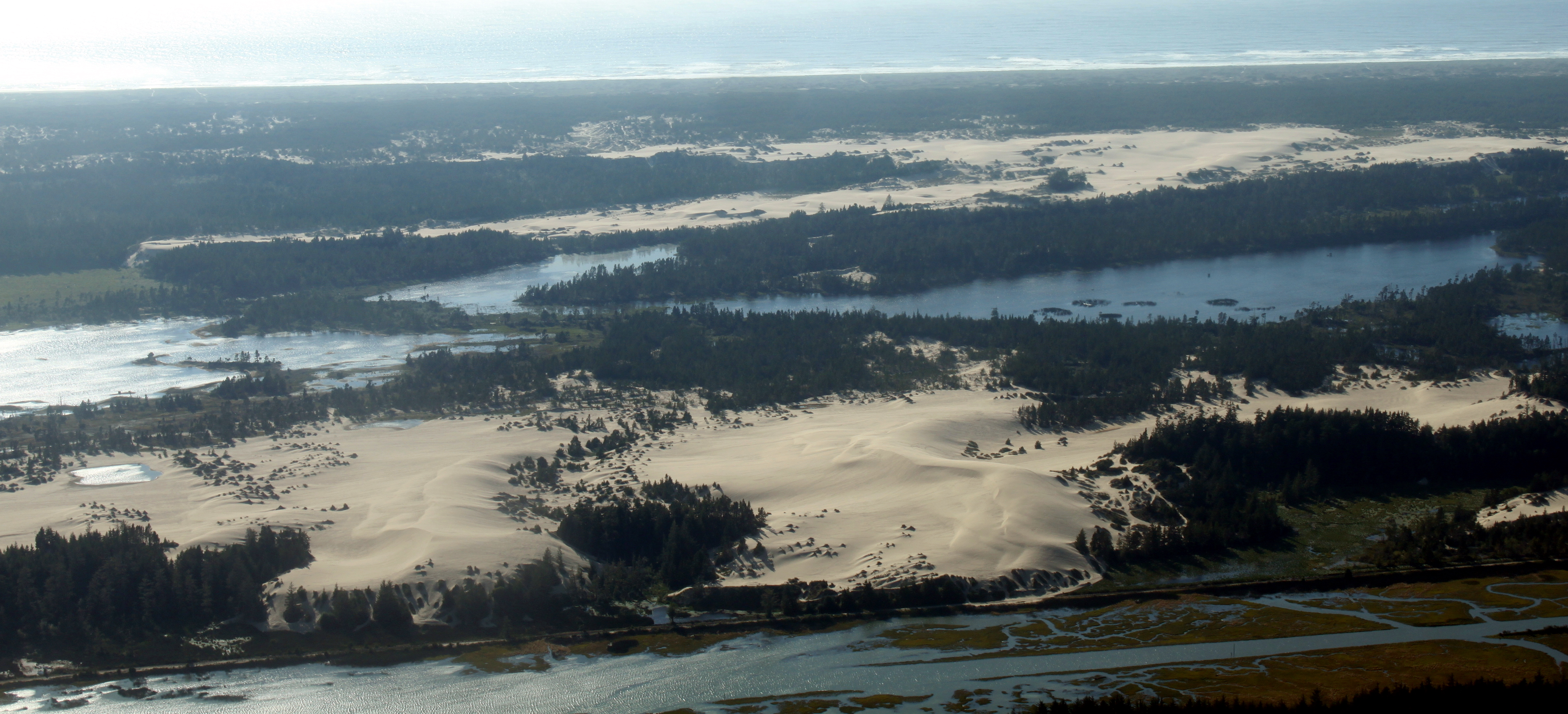
Dunes near Coos Bay

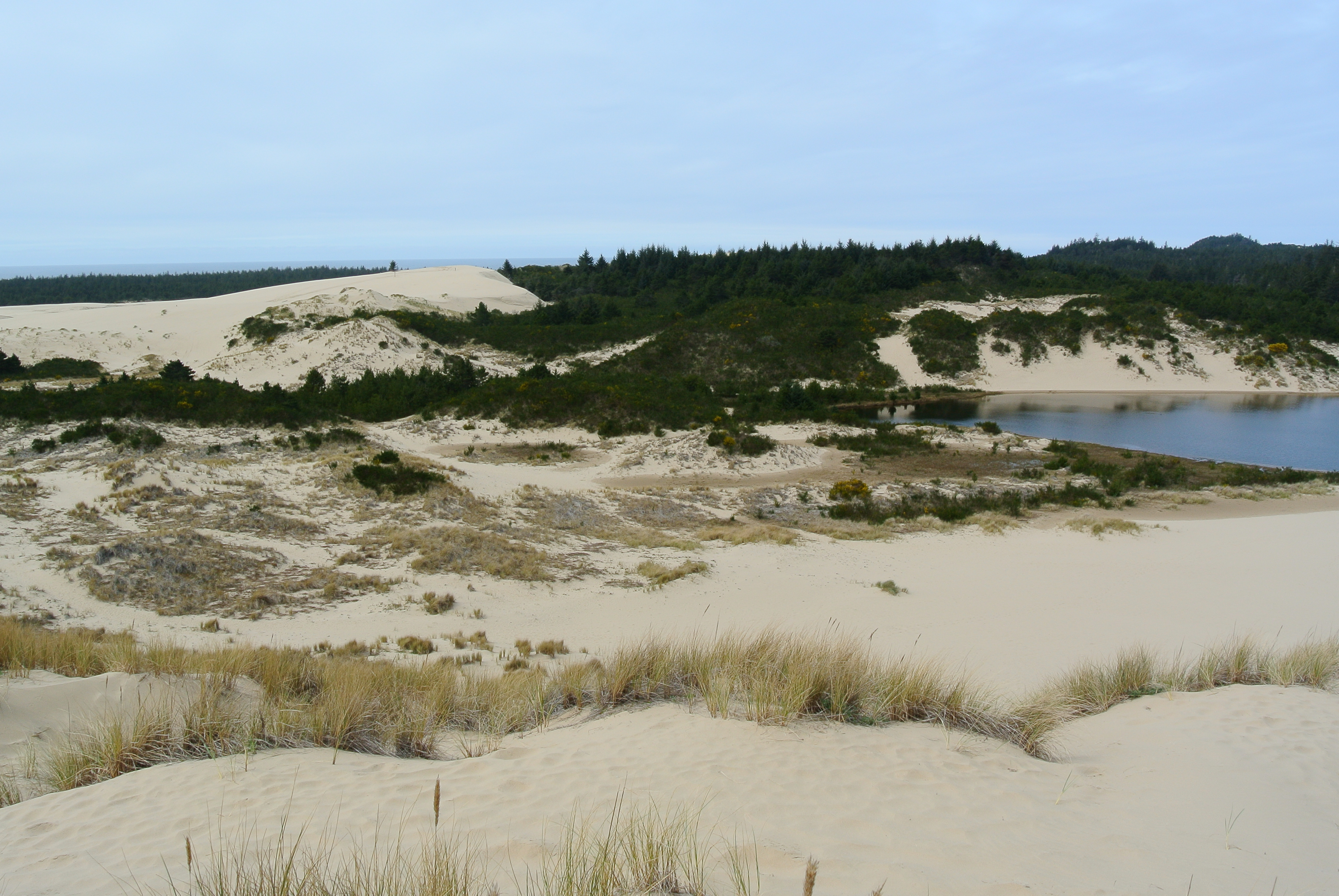
Jessie M. Honeyman Memorial State Park and part of Cleawox Lake, south of Florence

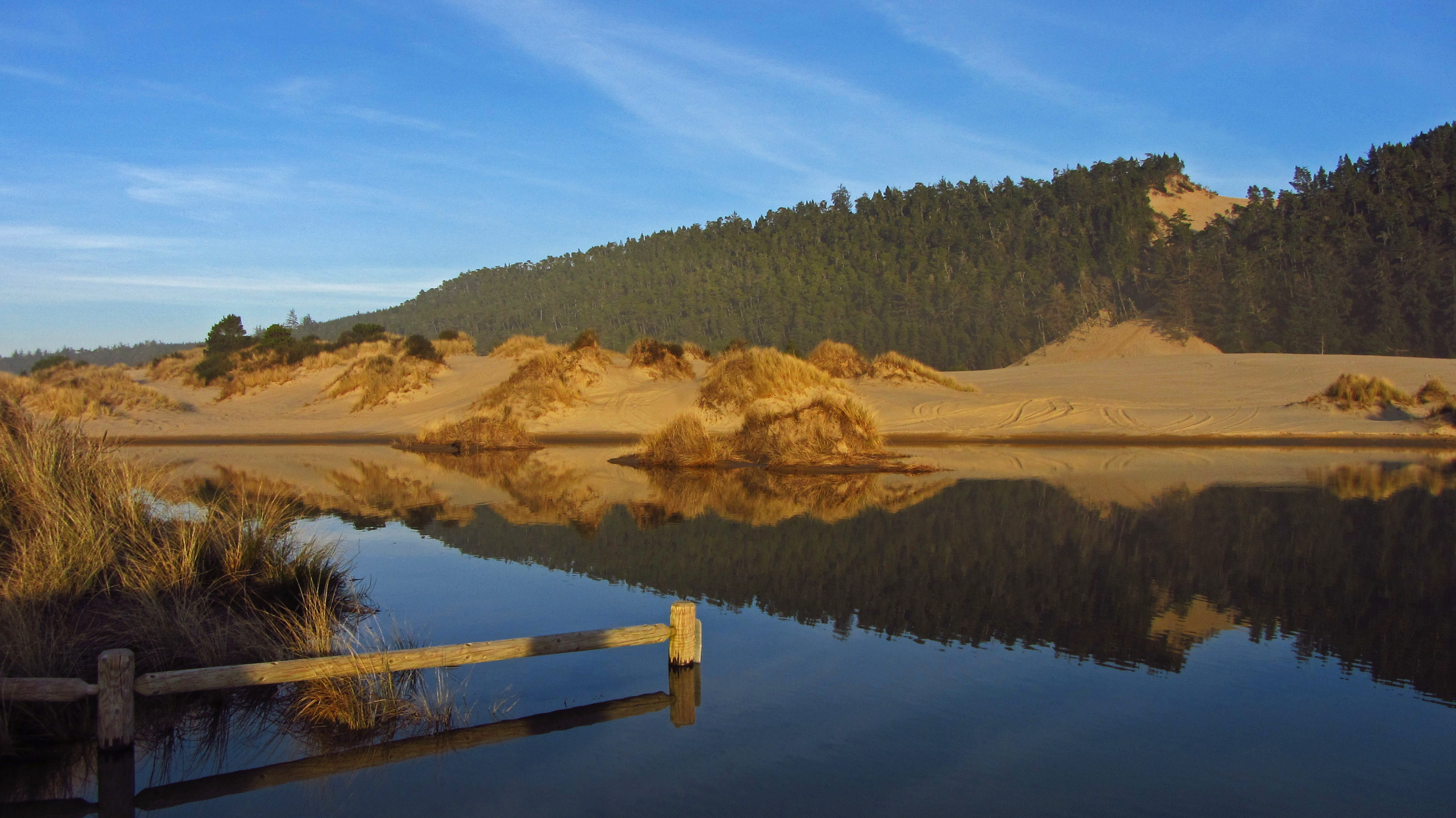
Banshee Hill is the highest dune in Oregon Dunes National Recreation Area at 500 feet elevation.

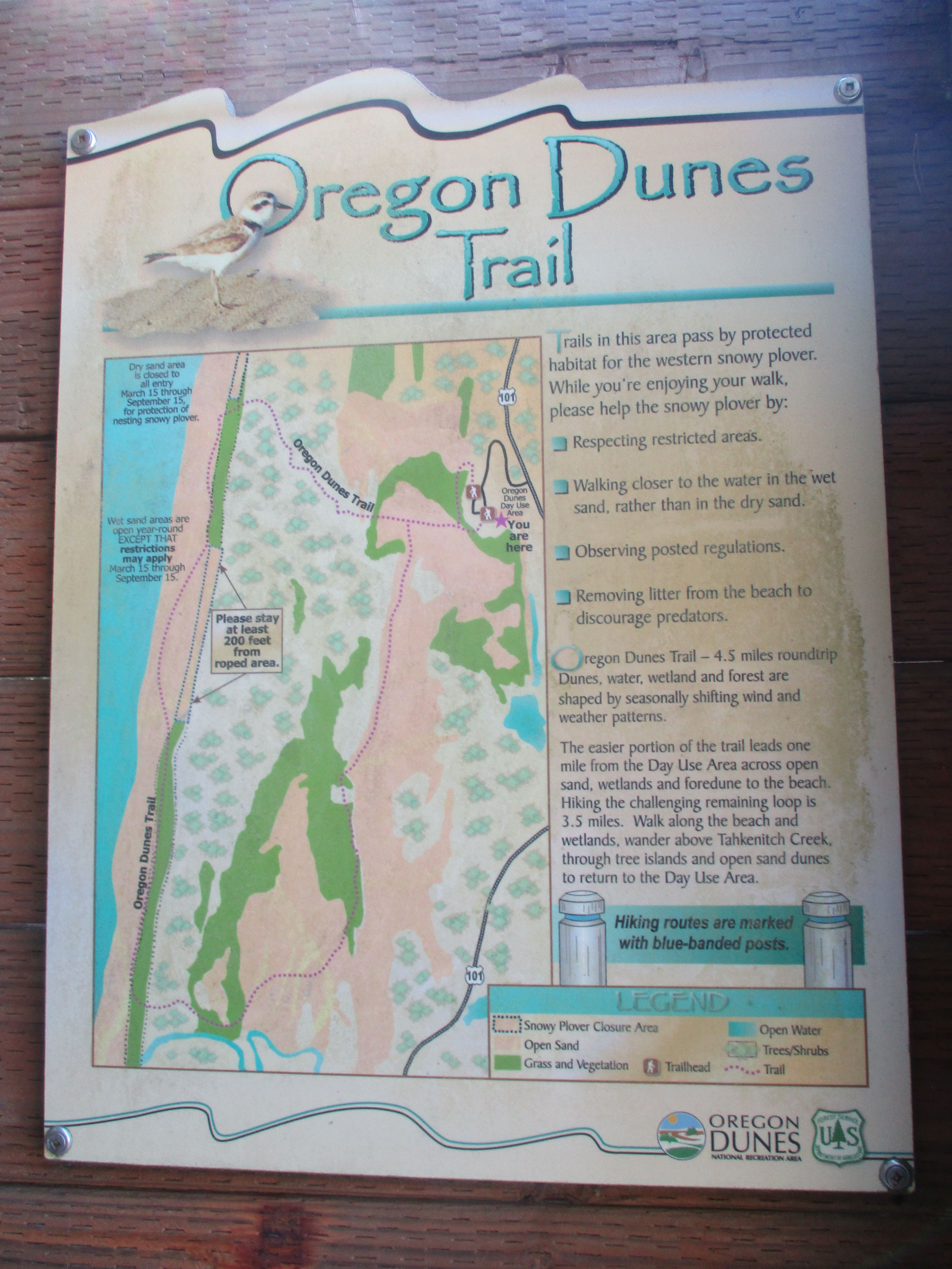
Sign showing trails at Oregon Dunes lookout.

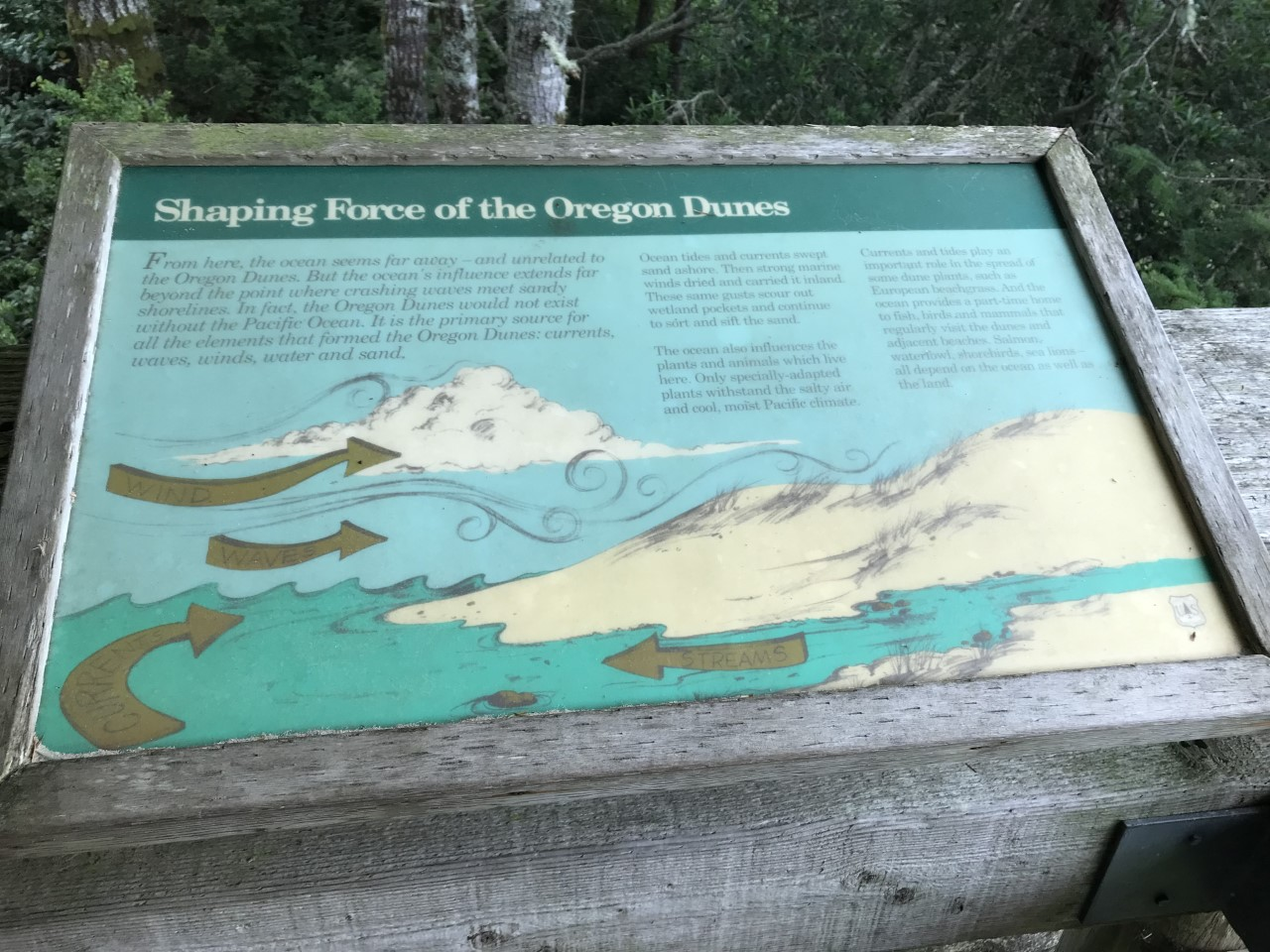
Sign showing how the dunes were formed.
