= Dunes City, Oregon =

- City
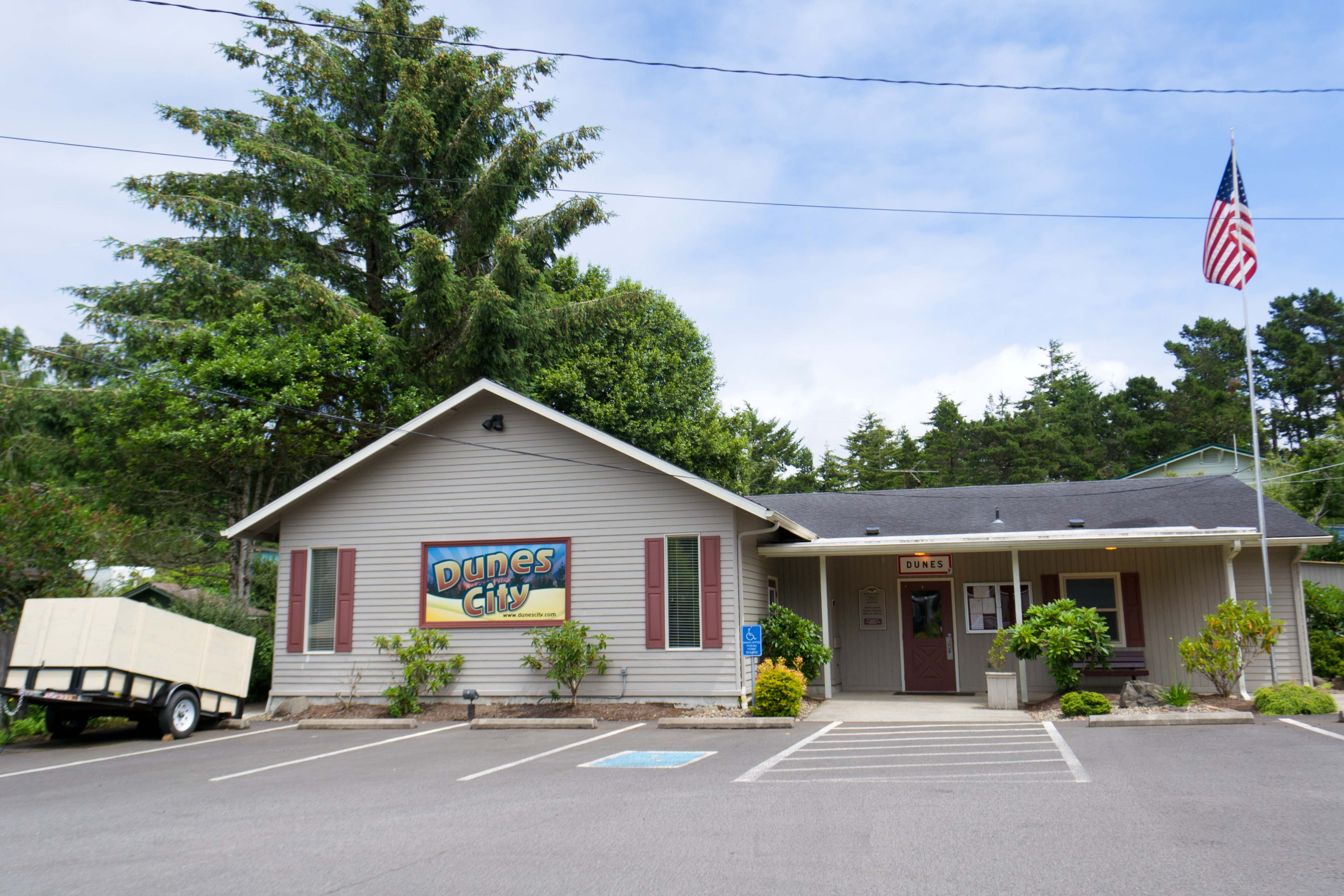
- Dunes City Hall
- Motto: It's Simply Paradise!
- Location in Oregon
- Coordinates: 43°53′25″N 124°06′12″W
- Country: United States
- State: Oregon
- County: Lane
- Incorporated: 1963

Area
  - Total: 3.46 sq mi (8.95 km^{2})
  - Land: 2.69 sq mi (6.96 km^{2})
  - Water: 0.76 sq mi (1.98 km^{2})
- Elevation: 112 ft (34 m)

Population (2020)
  - Total: 1,428
  - Density: 531.2/sq mi (205.11/km^{2})
- Time zone: UTC-8 (Pacific)
  - Summer (DST): UTC-7 (Pacific)
- ZIP code: 97493 (Westlake), and 97439 (Florence)
- Area codes: 458 and 541
- FIPS code: 41-21150
- GNIS feature ID: 2410371
- Website: www.dunescity.gov

Dunes City is a city in Lane County, Oregon, United States. As of the 2020 census, Dunes City had a population of 1,428.

== Geography ==
According to the United States Census Bureau, the city has a total area of 3.47 square miles (8.99 km^{2}), of which, 2.70 square miles (6.99 km^{2}) is land and 0.77 square miles (1.99 km^{2}) is water.

== Demographics ==
Historical population
Census	Pop.	Note	%±
1970	976		—
1980	1,124		15.2%
1990	1,081		−3.8%
2000	1,241		14.8%
2010	1,303		5.0%
2020	1,428		9.6%
U.S. Decennial Census

=== 2020 census ===
As of the 2020 census, Dunes City had a population of 1,428. The median age was 62.9 years. 10.4% of residents were under the age of 18 and 46.0% of residents were 65 years of age or older. For every 100 females there were 95.9 males, and for every 100 females age 18 and over there were 97.2 males age 18 and over.

0% of residents lived in urban areas, while 100.0% lived in rural areas.

There were 682 households in Dunes City, of which 14.1% had children under the age of 18 living in them. Of all households, 58.4% were married-couple households, 17.0% were households with a male householder and no spouse or partner present, and 18.3% were households with a female householder and no spouse or partner present. About 25.5% of all households were made up of individuals and 17.0% had someone living alone who was 65 years of age or older.

There were 862 housing units, of which 20.9% were vacant. Among occupied housing units, 86.2% were owner-occupied and 13.8% were renter-occupied. The homeowner vacancy rate was 2.2% and the rental vacancy rate was 3.1%.

Racial composition as of the 2020 census
Race	Number	Percent
White	1,267	88.7%
Black or African American	2	0.1%
American Indian and Alaska Native	17	1.2%
Asian	10	0.7%
Native Hawaiian and Other Pacific Islander	1	0.1%
Some other race	17	1.2%
Two or more races	114	8.0%
Hispanic or Latino (of any race)	46	3.2%

=== 2010 census ===
As of the census of 2010, there were 1,303 people, 609 households, and 407 families living in the city. The population density was 482.6 inhabitants per square mile (186.3/km^{2}). There were 845 housing units at an average density of 313.0 per square mile (120.8/km^{2}). The racial makeup of the city was 95.4% White, 0.2% African American, 0.7% Native American, 0.7% Asian, 0.1% Pacific Islander, 0.4% from other races, and 2.5% from two or more races. Hispanic or Latino of any race were 1.7% of the population.

There were 609 households, of which 16.3% had children under the age of 18 living with them, 58.1% were married couples living together, 5.4% had a female householder with no husband present, 3.3% had a male householder with no wife present, and 33.2% were non-families. 25.1% of all households were made up of individuals, and 15.6% had someone living alone who was 65 years of age or older. The average household size was 2.14 and the average family size was 2.51.

The median age in the city was 59.4 years. 13.4% of residents were under the age of 18; 3.2% were between the ages of 18 and 24; 10.9% were from 25 to 44; 37% were from 45 to 64; and 35.5% were 65 years of age or older. The gender makeup of the city was 50.5% male and 49.5% female.

=== 2000 census ===
At the 2000 census, there were 1,241 people, 558 households and 414 families living in the city. The population density was 463.3 inhabitants per square mile (178.9/km^{2}). There were 705 housing units at an average density of 263.2 per square mile (101.6/km^{2}). The racial makeup of the city was 97.02% White, 0.08% African American, 1.37% Native American, 0.48% Asian, 0.08% Pacific Islander, 0.08% from other races, and 0.89% from two or more races. Hispanic or Latino of any race were 1.21% of the population.

There were 558 households, of which 18.3% had children under the age of 18 living with them, 67.6% were married couples living together, 5.2% had a female householder with no husband present, and 25.8% were non-families. 21.1% of all households were made up of individuals, and 10.0% had someone living alone who was 65 years of age or older. The average household size was 2.22 and the average family size was 2.55.

Age distribution was 16.8% under the age of 18, 2.6% from 18 to 24, 16.1% from 25 to 44, 37.1% from 45 to 64, and 27.3% who were 65 years of age or older. The median age was 53 years. For every 100 females, there were 97.0 males. For every 100 females age 18 and over, there were 91.5 males.

The median household income city was $39,100, and the median family income was $47,574. Males had a median income of $34,167 versus $25,417 for females. The per capita income for the city was $27,048, about 8.5% of families and 10.6% of the population were below the poverty line, including 17.5% of those under age 18 and 7.6% of those age 65 or over.
