= Coos =

Coos may refer to:

== People ==
- Cowasuck, also known as Cowass or Coös, an Algonquian-speaking Native American tribe in northeastern North America
- Coos people, an Indigenous people of the Northwest Plateau in Oregon
- Confederated Tribes of Coos, Lower Umpqua and Siuslaw Indians, federally recognized tribe of Coos people

== Places ==
=== Inhabited places in the United States ===
- Coös County, New Hampshire
- Coos Bay, Oregon, a small city on Coos Bay
- Coos County, Oregon

=== Landforms ===
- Coos Bay, an inlet of the Pacific Ocean
- Coos River, southwest Oregon

== Languages ==
- Coosan languages, sometimes called Coos or Kusan, a language family formerly spoken on the southern Oregon coast
  - Coos, another name for the Hanis language, one of the two extinct Coosan languages of the southern Oregon coast

== See also ==
- Coosa (disambiguation)
- Kos, an island southwest of Asia Minor
