= Miluk language =

Extinct Native American language formerly spoken in Oregon

Miluk
- Lower Coquille
- miluk tɬiis
- Pronunciation: [míluk]
- Native to: United States
- Region: Oregon
- Ethnicity: Miluk people
- Extinct: 1939, with the death of Annie Miner Peterson
- Revival
- Language family: Coosan: Miluk

Language codes
- ISO 639-3: iml
- Glottolog: milu1241
- Map of Coosan languages

Miluk, also known as Lower Coquille from its location, is one of two Coosan languages. It shares more than half of its vocabulary with Hanis, though these are not always obvious, and grammatical differences cause the two languages to look quite different. Miluk started being displaced by Athabaskan in the late 18th century, and many Miluk shifted to Athabaskan and Hanis.

Miluk was spoken around the lower Coquille River and the South Slough of Coos Bay. The name míluk is the endonym, derived from a village name. The last fully fluent speaker of Miluk was Annie Miner Peterson, who died in 1939. She knew both Miluk and Hanis, and made a number of recordings. Laura Hodgkiss Metcalf, who died in 1961, was the last functional speaker (her mother was Miluk), and was an informant to Morris Swadesh for his Penutian Vocabulary Survey.

== Phonology ==
=== Consonants ===
The consonant inventory of Miluk can be tabulated as follows, based on Douglas-Tavani (2024):

		Bilabial	Alveolar			Alveo- palatal	Velar		Uvular		Glottal	
		Bilabial	plain	sibilant	lateral	Alveo- palatal	plain	labialized	plain	labialized	plain	labialized
Plosive/ Affricate	voiceless	p	t	t͜s	t͜ɬ	t͜ʃ	k	kʷ	q	qʷ	ʔ	
Plosive/ Affricate	ejective	pʼ	tʼ	t͜sʼ	t͜ɬʼ	t͜ʃʼ	kʼ	kʼʷ	qʼ	qʷʼ		
Plosive/ Affricate	voiced	b	d	d͜z	d͜l	d͜ʒ	ɡ	ɡʷ	ɢ	ɢʷ		
Fricative	voiceless			s	ɬ	ʃ	x	xʷ	χ	χʷ	h	hʷ
Fricative	voiced						ɣ		(ʁ)			
Sonorant	plain	m	n		l	j		w				
Sonorant	glottalized	mˀ	nˀ		lˀ	jˀ		wˀ				
Sonorant	geminated	(mː)	(nː)		(lː)							

- /ɣ/ may also range to uvular [ʁ] in free variation.
- /m, n, l/ are also heard as geminated [mː, nː, lː]. Gemination may be phonemic in Miluk, but Jacobs (1939 & 1940) transcribed few instances of these geminate sonorants. Some words transcribed with [mː, nː, lː] in the data are also transcribed at other times with [m, n, l], while some words are transcribed consistently as geminated and never as their shorter counterparts. Due to this ambiguity, the geminate sonorants are listed here as allophonic.

=== Vowels ===
	Front	Central	Back
High	i		u
Mid-High	ɪ		ʊ
Mid-Low	ɛ	ə	
Low		a	

- /ɛ/ is pronounced between [æ] and [ɛ], but it tends towards the latter.
- /a/ is pronounced somewhere between [a] and [ɑ], likely often pronounced centrally as [ä].
- /u/ is sometimes articulated as [oː] or [oʊ], though these appear in free variation with [u].
- /i/ and /ɪ/ have a proven minimal pair (wii= 'thus' & wi 'who') and are therefore distinct phonemes, despite Jacobs originally considering them as two allophones of one phoneme.
- /u/ and /ʊ/ have no exact minimal pair but do have minimal environments. In general, words are consistently pronounced with /u/ and /ʊ/ without variation, and this lack of a minimal pair can therefore be most plausibly described as a result of documentation gaps. Therefore, they are listed here as separate phonemes.

Vowel harmony occurs in Miluk, although sporadic. The most common occurrence of vowel harmony in Miluk is the harmonization of /ɛ/ in roots with /ɑ/ in suffixes.

== Grammar ==
=== Syntax ===
==== Verb - Argument Order ====
Miluk verbs have a tendency to be clause-initial. Arguments that are expressed with overt noun phrases usually follow the verb, while pronominal arguments expressed are encoded in clitics that attach to the verb. Absolutive and ergative arguments can be interchangeable.

The following example shows the ergative argument before the absolutive argument.

áyu ás-d-a tłə-x hú'mik' tłə də-dím sin
indeed decorate-T-3.OBJ ART-ERG old.woman ART 3SG-POSS grandson
"Indeed the old woman decorated her grandson."

However, in the next example, the absolutive argument precedes the ergative argument.

Tsú wɛn ilduwa tɬə dí hímɛ tɬɛ -x t’smíxwən
Cu wen illtwa ʎə tə- hiime ʎə -x c’miixwən
NR thus say ART 3SG.POS children ART ERG trickster
"Then this is what the trickster told his children"

==== Order Variation in Presentational Constructions ====
Miluk often uses a presentational construction when telling stories or recounting an event to bring attention to the subject of the story. As a result of this, the affected noun phrase is fronted in the sentence and often appears clause-initially. The following examples are of the presentational construction, with the presented construction bolded.

gwɛis gus mín du kwí alam yúgwa
kweis kuus min tu kwi alam yugwa
girl all time HAB EST myrtle.nut gather
"There was a girl who was always picking myrtle nuts"

Tit’sɛwəs tsú ha dlúqws -əm
Tic’eewəs cu ha ʎuqws -əm
Young.girl now REC.PERF get.up NTR
"A girl who had just passed her first menses had just now arisen."

==== Possessive Order ====
In Miluk, the possessive noun phrase precedes what is possessed. The possessed noun takes no article but instead is marked with the oblique [tə].

=== Morphology ===
There are two articles in Miluk, kʷə and ʎə. ʎə is used with nouns that are closer to the speaker, while kʷə is used for nouns which are more distant. These articles do not reflect a gender of a noun and both articles have been found in use for the same noun in discourse. Verbs have intransitive, imperfect, and perfect marker. Verbs which are intransitive take the -u suffix, while the imperfect tense takes the -ʔi suffix and the perfect tense takes the -t suffix.

==== Morphosyntactic Alignment ====
Miluk has an ergative–absolutive distinction, expressed morphologically; the suffix -x denotes the ergative case in Miluk, and the absolutive case is unmarked.

In the following examples, the ergative argument comes before the absolutive argument.

áyu ás-d-a tłə-x hú'mik' tłə də-dím sin
indeed decorate-T-3.OBJ ART-ERG old.woman art 3SG-POSS grandson
"Indeed the old woman decorated her grandson."

Miluk allows for the opposite to occur, as we see the absolutive argument precede the ergative argument.

gasíya du galam tłə máqt'ł tłə-x gwɛis
almost HAB grab ART crow ART-ERG girl
"The girl almost caught the crow."

==== Gender, Number, Person ====
Miluk does not have a masculine/feminine gender distinction, but it does have reflexives of an old gender system. The language reflects this old system in two instances: with a suffix that follows articles (-č) and in lexical items for male and female people throughout life. The suffix -č has been seen to be optional but occurs in three instances:

1. following a feminine noun,
2. referring to a young person, and (the most common)
3. referring to elders.

The second place where Miluk holds on to an older gender system is when referring to males or females. Words for males often begin with /t/, while the female words often begin with /hu/ and /w/.

Miluk has no marked third person clitic on verbs. This is flouted as presentational fronting occurs whenever a new argument is introduced, which are the sentences most likely to have two third-person arguments, and sentences uttered after this argument has been introduced that have two third-person arguments will only express the defocused one through an overt noun phrase, while the other is understood through context within the discourse rather than through a co-indexed clitic.

Miluk has an inclusive and exclusive distinction when it comes to the dual possessive. In the first person dual inclusive, the words receive the circumfix s=nə-, while the first person dual exclusive receives the prefix nə-.

Pronominal prefixes
	Singular	Dual	Plural
1	w(ə)-	s- (inc)	ɬ-
1	w(ə)-	nə- (excl)	ɬ-
2	nə-	is-	čil-
3	Ø	ič-	iɬ-

==== Space, Time, Modality ====
There are two morphemes which can be added to a verb to mark tense. The morpheme han indicates the prospective tense, which describes that an event is going to occur. The other morpheme that can be added to a verb is hanƛ, which marks the future tense. The future tense is distinguished from the prospective tense and has appeared irrealis marker a ̆x. The order in which the morphemes appear are the pronominal clitics, followed by mood, tense and then aspect.

In the following examples, "han" indicates that an event is going to occur.

Tsú han t’ámi tɬə də- t’ím
Cu han t’aami ʎə tə- t’im
NR PRSP carry ART 3SG.POS Pack
"Now she was going to pack her load"

Tsú han áyu ġɛlts
Cu han aayu qelc
NR PRSP indeed cross
"And then she was going to cross on it indeed"

==== Obliques ====
The morpheme tə marks an oblique or possessive, which occurs throughout the Salish language family. The following two example reveals -tə acting as the oblique marker.

Tsú k’wɛn wus- ú’s -u tɬə də- ‘úmnatt’ɬ -ədja
cu k’ween wus- wus -u ʎə te- umnaaʎ -əča
now news REDUP go.home NTR.PERF ART 3SG.POS grandmother LOC
"He returned with news to his grandmother"

tsú má gɛ’ yáhwi tɬə də yɛis -ədja
cu ma qee yahwi ʎə te yeis -əča
now CONT there rub ART 3SG.POS mouth LOC
"And he kept rubbing it on her mouth"

== Status ==
The Miluk language is now extinct. The last speakers were two sisters, Lolly Hotchkiss and Daisy Wasson Codding. The two worked with a linguist in 1953 to record words from the language but the two were not fluent in adulthood, and had trouble remembering words. The last native speaker was Annie Miner Peterson, who knew both Miluk and Hanis. Annie Peterson's first language was Miluk, and in 1930, Annie Miner Peterson began working with Melville Jacobs and the two produced two volumes of texts in both dialects of Coos. Coos Narrative and Ethnographic Texts and Coos Myth Texts were the two publications were published, but the two publications did not have any linguistic analysis. The books only provided English translations to the texts.

== Bibliography ==
- Jacobs, Melville. (1939). Coos narrative and ethnologic texts. University of Washington publications in anthropology (Vol. 8, No. 1). Seattle, WA: University of Washington.
- Jacobs, Melville. (1940). Coos myth texts. University of Washington publications in anthropology (Vol. 8, No. 2). Seattle, WA: University of Washington.
- Anderson, Troy. (1990). Miluk Dictionary. Stanford Library. Green Library Stacks. PM961 .A53 1990
