= Coos Bay (disambiguation) =

Coos Bay is a bay on the coast of Oregon in the United States.

Coos Bay may also refer to:

- Coos Bay, Oregon, a city in Oregon
  - Port of Coos Bay
  - Coos Bay Rail Link
- USS Coos Bay (AVP-25), a United States Navy seaplane tender in commission from 1943 to 1946
- USCGC Coos Bay (WAVP-376), later WHEC-376, a United States Coast Guard cutter in commission from 1949 to 1966

== See also ==
- Coos (disambiguation)
