= Elizabeth Jacobs =

Elizabeth Jacobs may refer to:

- Elizabeth Jacobs (anthropologist) (1903–1983), American anthropologist
- Elizabeth Jacobs (gymnast) (born 1989), Australian acrobatic gymnast
- Elizabeth Jacobs (politician) (1900–?), British doctor and politician
- Elizabeth Jacobs (author), writer of steamy romance novels in Dutch and English
