= Annie Miner Peterson =

Indigenous linguistic consultant (1860–1939)

Annie Miner Peterson (1860–1939) was a Coos Indian from the U.S. state of Oregon who was a cultural and linguistic consultant to Melville Jacobs, an anthropologist at the University of Washington.

== Personal life ==
Annie was born in 1860 of a Coos Indian mother and a Euro-American father, James Miner, whom she never met, at the native village of Willanch (Wu'læ'ænch, meaning good-weather-place) at the present-day Cooston, on the east shore of upper Coos Bay on the southern Oregon Coast. She was one of the last Coos Indians to grow up in the traditional Coos culture. As an infant she was taken by her mother to the Coastal Indian Reservation at Yaquina Bay, and later removed to the sub-agency at Yachats where she grew up and married, first to an abusive older Hanis man, and later to William Jackson, an Alsea Indian her own age. Through their daughter, Nellie (Aason), there are descendants to the present day. Annie married three more times, unhappily, but her last marriage was a happy and compatible relationship with a Swedish logger named Carl Peterson.

== Linguistic career ==
In 1933 while searching for a suitable consultant in the Hanis Coos language from among the eight or ten elderly Coos Indians who were still fluent at that time, Jacobs discovered that Peterson was fluent not only in Hanis, but also in Miluk Coos, a Penutian language thought to have been extinct for at least fifteen years. Through the summers of 1933 and 1934, Jacobs interviewed Peterson in those two languages, collecting 32 Coos myth texts in Miluk, eight in Hanis, and two in both Hanis and Miluk for comparison of the two languages. Wax-cylinder phonograph recordings were also taken of the myths and songs during both years. In addition, Jacobs collected from Peterson a large number of narrative and ethnologic texts in Miluk, a smaller number in Hanis, and eight texts in both Hanis and Miluk. The narrative and ethnologic texts were published in 1939; the myth texts in 1940.

== Artistic and cultural career ==
Annie Miner Peterson was an accomplished basket maker, storyteller, and repository of Indigenous Coos languages and culture.

== Death and legacy ==
Both Annie and Carl Peterson both died of tuberculosis in 1939 at their home on lower Coos Bay.

Her full-length biography was published by University of Oklahoma Press in 1997: She's Tricky Like Coyote: Annie Miner Peterson, an Oregon Coast Indian Woman, by Lionel Youst.
