= Yakima practical alphabet =

Orthography used for some Sahaptin languages

The Yakima practical alphabet is an orthography used to write Sahaptin languages of the Pacific Northwest of North America.

== History ==
The Yakima practical alphabet is based on the Americanist phonetic notation as well as the International Phonetic Alphabet (IPA).

== Uses ==
The Yakima practical alphabet is currently used in research, language teaching, and language revitalization efforts. According to Jansen (2010), Sahaptian languages

[do] not have a long written tradition and the alphabet systems for writing the language are still fairly new. Words and sounds have been written by different individuals in a number of different ways. The system is not completely standardized, and, given the differences between dialects and speakers, many words have more than one “correct” spelling and pronunciation. In addition, pronunciations change depending on how carefully a person is speaking, how quickly they are speaking, and whether they are in a formal setting or at home. In telling legends or relating something that happened, words can be drawn out for emphasis, or said quickly to emphasize an abrupt or sudden event. Not every word is said the same way every time, and the variations are important to maintain.

== Comparison with other orthographies ==
- IPA = International Phonetic Alphabet
- YPA = Yakima practical alphabet
- WSIR = Warm Springs Indian Reservation alphabet
- CTUIR = Confederated Tribes of the Umatilla Indian Reservation technical alphabet
- MJTA = Melville Jacobs' technical alphabet

Comparison
IPA	YPA	WSIR	CTUIR	MJTA
a	a	a	a	a
aː	aa	aa	aa	a⋅, ω⋅
t͡ʃ	ch	č, ch	č	tc
t͡ʃʼ	chʼ	čʼ, chʼ	č̓	t́c
h	h	h	h	h
i	i	i	i	i
iː	ii	ii	ii	i⋅, ei, ɛ⋅
ə	ɨ	omitted	ɨ	ə
k	k	k	k	k, ɢ
kʼ	kʼ	kʼ	k̓	ḱ
kʷ	kw	kw	kʷ	kw, ɢw
kʷʼ	kwʼ	kwʼ	k̓ʷ	ḱw
q	ḵ	q	q	q
qʼ	ḵʼ	qʼ	q̓	q́
qʷ	ḵw	qw	qʷ	qw
qʷʼ	ḵwʼ	qwʼ	q̓ʷ	q́w
l	l	l	l	l
ɬ	ƚ, ɬ	ɫ	ɫ	ɫ
m	m	m	m	m
n	n	n	n	n
p	p	p	p	p, b
pʼ	pʼ	pʼ	p̓	ṕ
s	s	s	s	s
ʃ	sh	š, sh	š	c
t	t	t	t	t, d
tʼ	tʼ	tʼ	t̓	t́, t́θ
t͡ɬ	tƚ, tɬ	tɫ	ƛ	tɫ
t͡ɬʼ	tlʼ, tɬʼ	tɫʼ	ƛ̓	t́ɫ
t͡s	ts	c	c	ts
t͡sʼ	tsʼ	cʼ	c̓	t́s
u	u	u	u	u
uː	uu	uu	uu	u⋅, ω⋅
w	w	w	w	w
x	x	x̂	χ	x
χ	x̱	x	χ̣	x̣
xʷ	xw	x̂w	χʷ	xw
χʷ	x̱w	xw	χ̣ʷ	x̣w, xᵘ
j	y	y	y	y
ʔ	ʼ	ʼ	ʔ	ʼ
