= OIMB =

OIMB may refer to:

- Oregon Institute of Marine Biology, University of Oregon, Charleston, Oregon, U.S.
- ICAO airport code for Birjand International Airport in Iran
