= Cooston, Oregon =

Unincorporated community in the state of Oregon, United States

Coordinates: 43.394835°N 124.185389°W

Cooston is an unincorporated community in Coos County, Oregon, United States. It is located on the east shore of Coos Bay across from North Bend, about eight miles from the city of Coos Bay.

The origin of the name Cooston is the same of that of Coos County, after the Coos people. Cooston post office was established in 1908 and closed in 1939. The post office was named by town founder William E. Homme, who was also the first postmaster. Homme's father was the founder of Wittenberg, Wisconsin. The post office was in Homme's store. Before moving to Cooston, Homme published the Glendale News in Glendale.
