= South Slough National Estuarine Research Reserve =

Nature reserve in Oregon, United States

Coordinates: 43.28545°N 124.32155°W

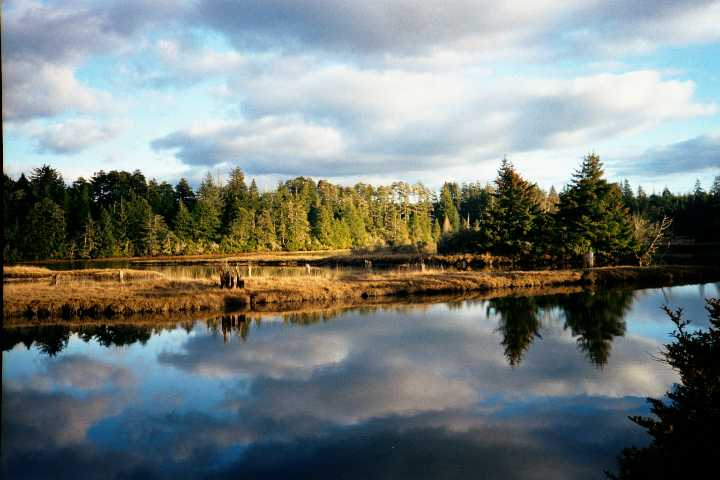
An evening view over the slough

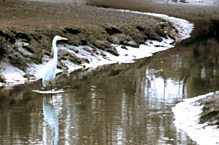
Waterfowl at the reserve

South Slough National Estuarine Research Reserve (SSNERR) is a 4,770-acre (19 km^{2}) National Estuarine Research Reserve located on Coos Bay Estuary, in the U.S. state of Oregon. Its headquarters are in Charleston. Established in 1974, it was the first reserve in the United States created in response to the federal Coastal Zone Management Act of 1972.

It is managed in partnership by the Oregon Department of State Lands (DSL) and the National Oceanic and Atmospheric Administration (NOAA).

The South Slough Visitor Center features exhibits and a film about the flora, fauna, and ecology of the South Slough Estuary and its cultural history. Programs include bird watching, tidepool explorations, guided hikes, paddle trips, bat box building, and more. Maps and brochures are available.
