= Haynes Inlet =

Bay in Oregon, United States

Coordinates: 43°27′09″N 124°12′14″W

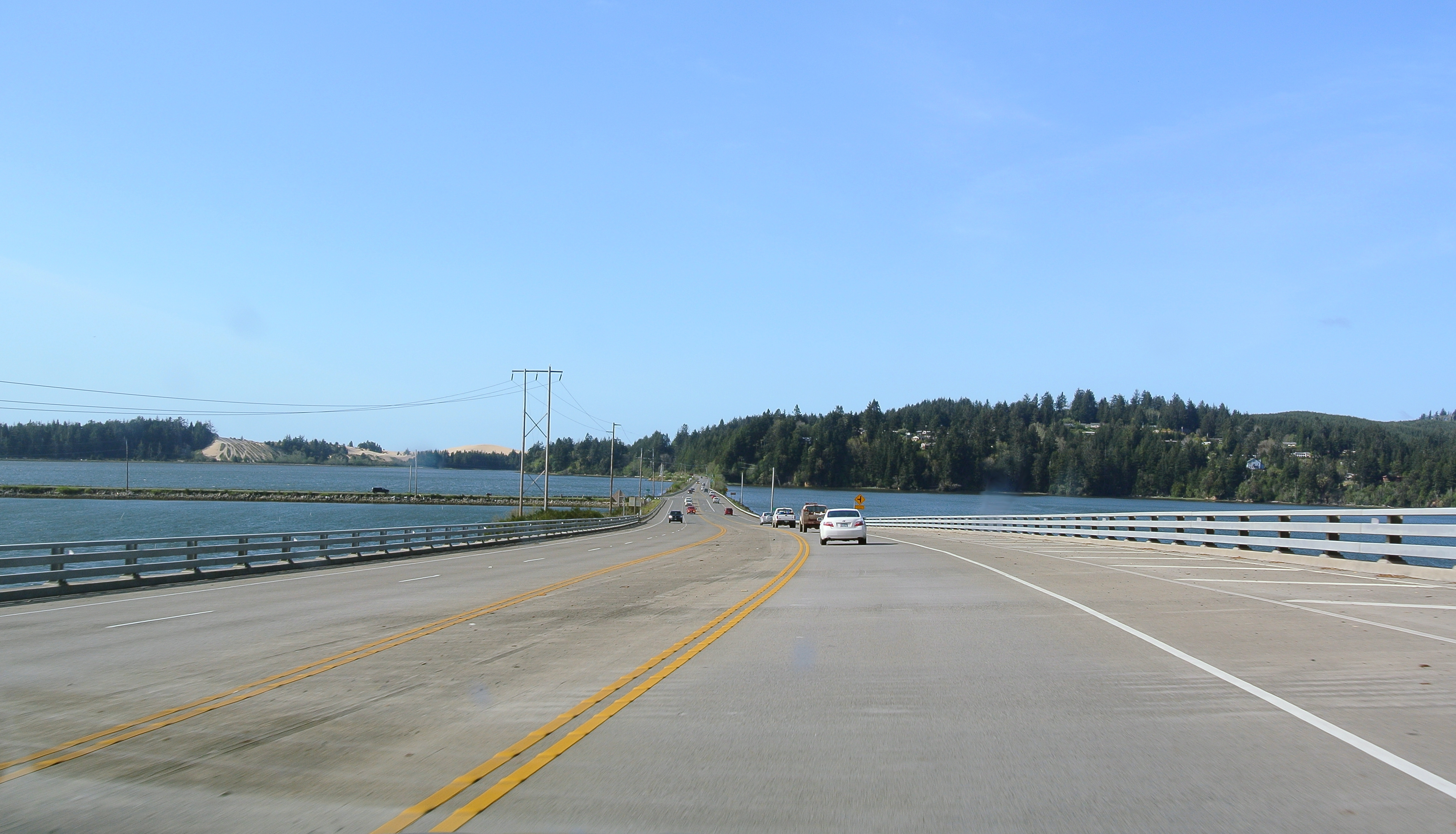
View towards north from Haynes Inlet Bridge

Haynes Inlet (or Haynes Slough) is a bay located in North Bend, Coos County.

It is crossed by the Haynes Inlet Bridge, part of the U.S. Route 101.

== See also ==
- Coos Bay
