= Charleston, Oregon =

Unincorporated community in the state of Oregon, United States

Charleston, Oregon Milukwich (Coos)
- Unincorporated community
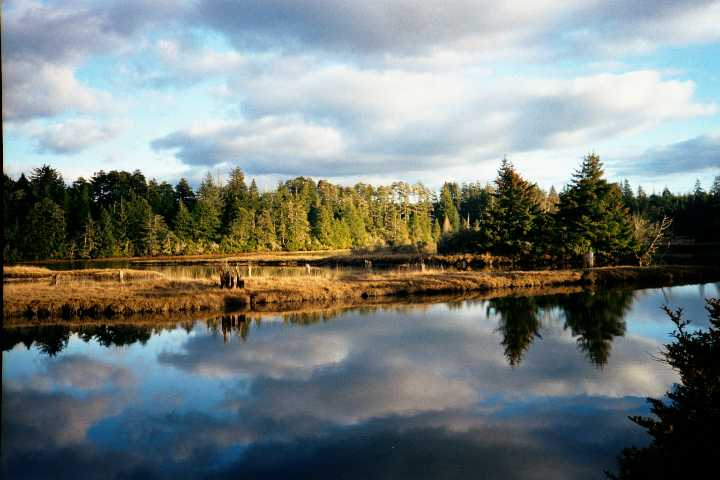
- An evening view of the National Estuarine Research Reserve slough

- Location within the state of Oregon Charleston (the United States)
- Coordinates: 43°20′24″N 124°19′48″W
- Country: United States
- State: Oregon
- County: Coos
- Elevation: 102 ft (31 m)

Population (2000)670
  - Total: 795
- Time zone: UTC-8 (Pacific (PST))
  - Summer (DST): UTC-7 (PDT)
- ZIP codes: 97420
- Area code: 541
- GNIS feature ID: 1136140

Charleston (Coos: Milukwich) is an unincorporated community in Coos County, Oregon, United States. Charleston is the least populated (Pop. 795 [2017]) community in Oregon's Bay Area. Home to a large commercial fishing fleet, it is adjacent to the ocean entrance to Coos Bay. Charleston is the site of the Oregon Institute of Marine Biology and the United States Coast Guard Charleston Lifeboat Station.

Charleston was named for Charles Haskell, a settler who filed a land claim along South Slough in 1853. South Slough is an arm of Coos Bay, which it enters near the bay's mouth on the Pacific Ocean. Oregon Route 540, which crosses the slough southwest of Barview, passes through Charleston and links it to three state parks further south along the coast: Sunset Bay, Shore Acres, and Cape Arago.

Postal authorities established a post office in Charleston in 1924. The community's ZIP code is 97420.

== Estuarine Research Reserve ==
The South Slough National Estuarine Research Reserve, a 4,770-acre (1,930 ha) reserve along the Coos Bay Estuary, was established in Charleston in 1974. It was the first of 28 such reserves in the United States and the only one in Oregon.
