= Oregon Institute of Marine Biology =

US research institute

Coordinates: 43.3441°N 124.3281°W

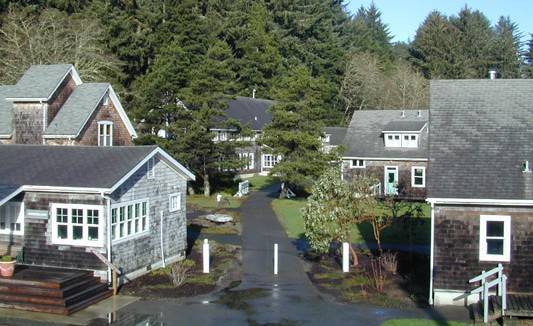
- Nickname: OIMB
- Established: 1924
- Field of research: marine biology, marine ecology, marine larval ecology, deep sea, invertebrate zoology
- Director: Dr. Amy Moran
- Location: 63466 Boat Basin Road, Charleston, Oregon, 97420, United States
- Affiliations: University of Oregon
- Website: naturalsciences.uoregon.edu/OIMB

The Oregon Institute of Marine Biology (or OIMB) is the marine station of the University of Oregon. This 100-acre (0.40 km^{2}) marine station is located in Charleston, Oregon, at the mouth of Coos Bay. Currently, OIMB is home to several permanent faculty members and a number of graduate students. OIMB is a member of the National Association of Marine Laboratories (NAML). In addition to graduate research, undergraduate classes are offered year round, including marine birds and mammals, estuarine biology, marine ecology, invertebrate zoology, molecular biology, biology of fishes, biological oceanography, and embryology.

The Loyd and Dorothy Rippey Library, one of eight branches of the UO Libraries, was added to the campus in 1999. The Rippey Library is open to the public by appointment, and the Oregon Card Program allows Oregon residents 16 years old and older to borrow from the collection.

The Charleston Marine Life Center (or CMLC) is a public museum and aquarium on the edge of the harbor in Charleston, OR, across the street from the OIMB campus. Displays aimed at visitors of all ages emphasize the diversity of animal and plant life in local marine ecosystems. Visitors learn where to interact with marine organisms in their natural environments and how local scientists study the life histories, evolution and ecology of underwater plants and animals.

== History ==
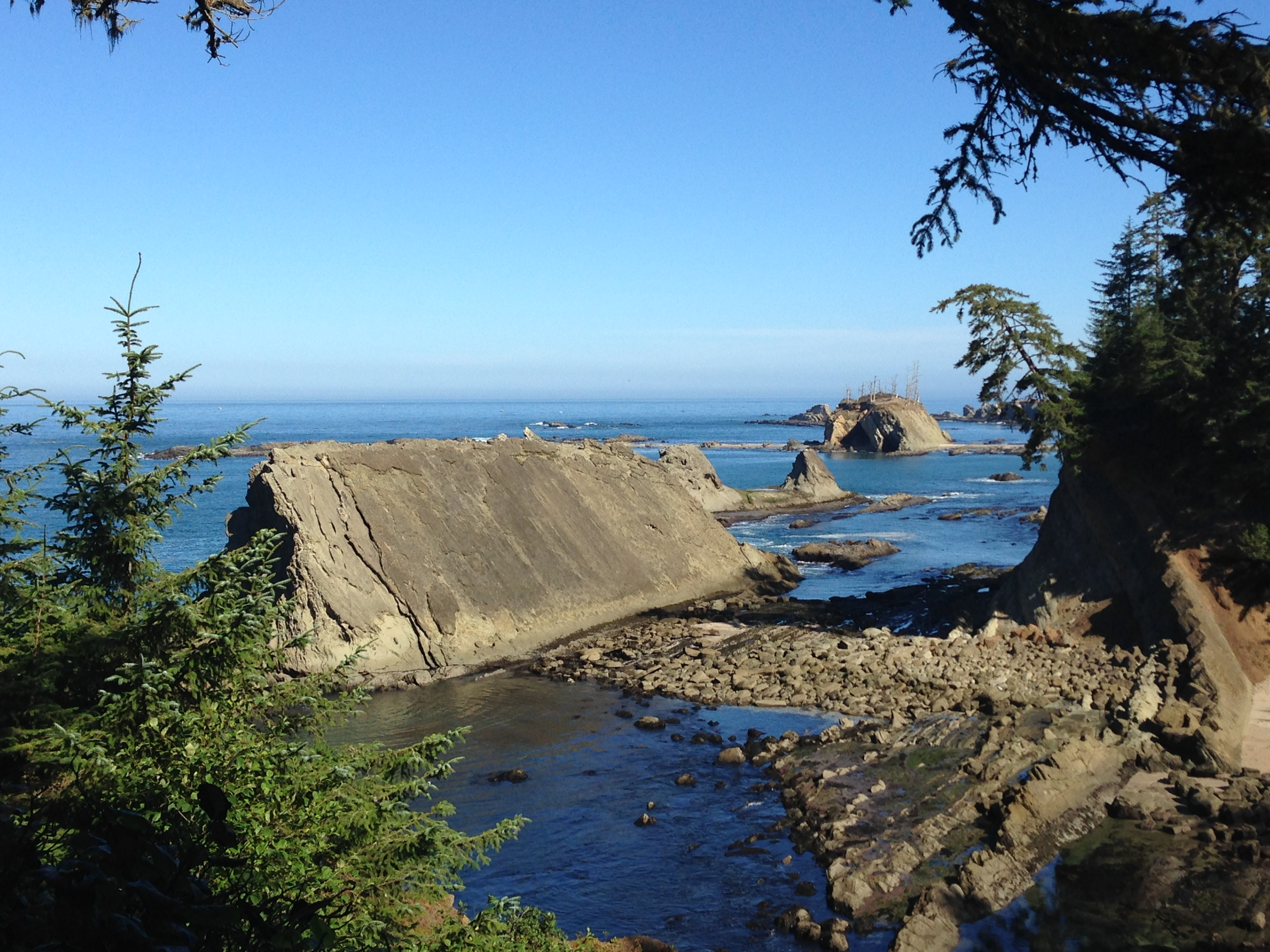
Photograph of Oregon Coast near OIMB Marine Lab

The University of Oregon first established OIMB as a summer research and education program in 1924, operating out of tents along the beach of Sunset Bay. OIMB settled into its current location in 1931, when 100 acres of the Coos Head Military Reserve, including several buildings from the Army Corps of Engineers, was deeded to the University of Oregon. In 1937, OIMB was transferred to Oregon State College (now Oregon State University), and remained theirs until the federal government required the property during World War II. Following the war, OIMB was initially returned to Oregon State University, but the University of Oregon reclaimed it in 1955 as a summer research facility. Since 1966, OIMB has been expanding its educational programs and its campus, constructing more teaching and research facilities and developing year-round educational programs. Notably, the Loyd and Dorothy Rippey Library was built in 1999, and construction of the Charleston Marine Life Center began in 2012. OIMB has functioned as a year-round research facility since 1966, and courses were developed for fall, spring, and summer soon after. Winter classes became available beginning in 2017.

== Research Vessels ==
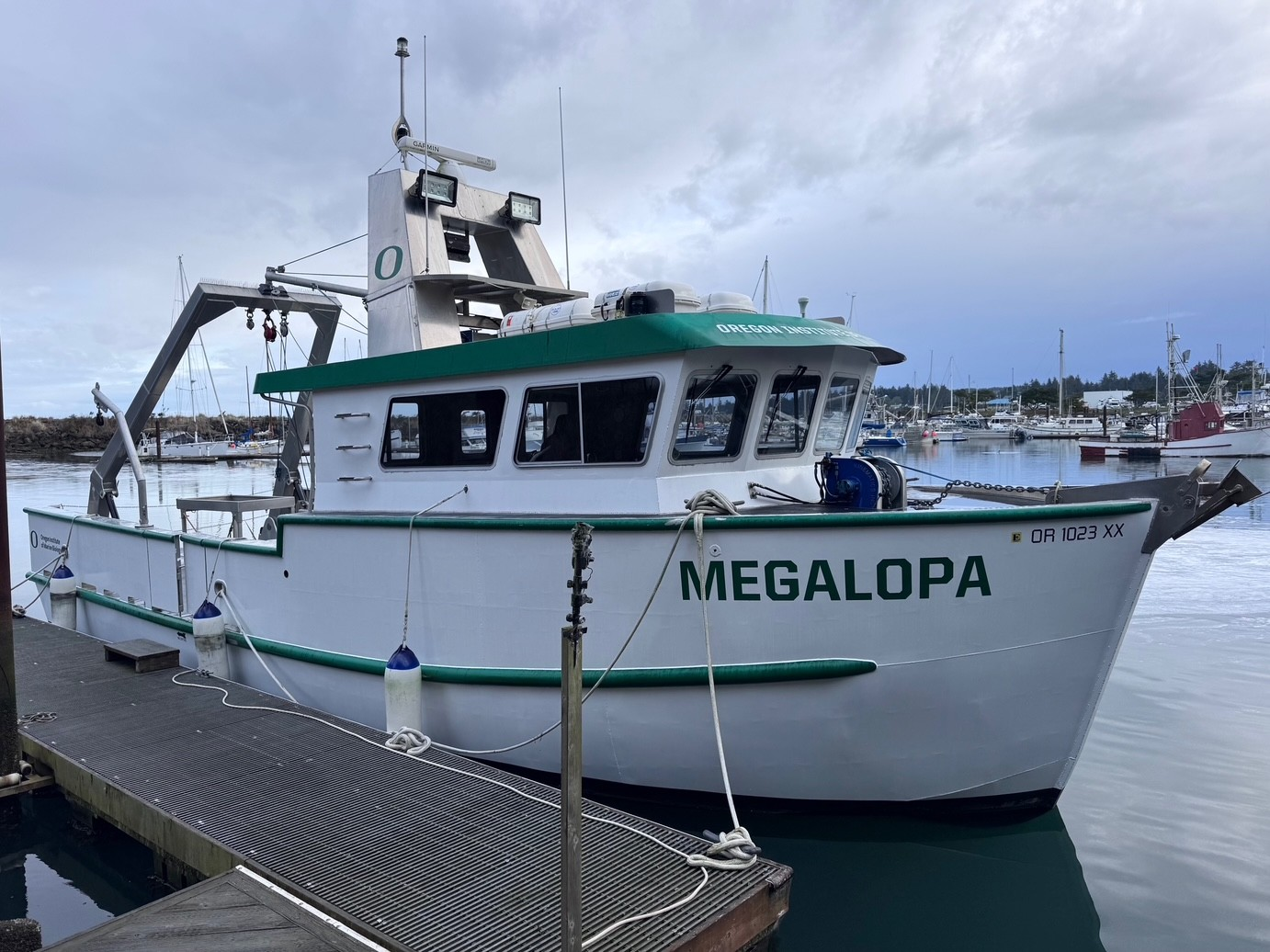
R/V Megalopa

OIMB operates the R/V Megalopa, a 48-foot research vessel with a > 50 mile offshore range that can carry up to 36 passengers, the R/V Pugettia, a 20-foot aluminum (Wooldridge) boat, and a fleet of smaller vessels.

OIMB also has its own 600 m Phantom ROV (Remotely Operated Vehicle).

== Courses ==
The Oregon Institute of Marine Biology offers both undergraduate and graduate level courses each term, which are open to University of Oregon students as well as students from other institutions.

Courses offered are as follows:

- Invertebrate Zoology
- Marine Ecology
- Estuarine Biology
- Deep-sea and Subtidal Ecology
- Biological Oceanography
- Marine Environmental Issues
- Cell Biology
- Marine Conservation Biology
- Molecular Biology for Marine Sciences
- Comparative Embryology and Larval Biology
- Animal Behavior
- Marine Birds and Mammals
- Biology of Fishes
- Introduction to Experimental Design and Statistics

Various weekend workshops during the summer including:

- Parasitology
- Biological Illustrations
- Seaweed Biology
- Marine Biological Invasions
- Marine Bioluminescence

== See also ==
- Hatfield Marine Science Center, a similar research facility associated with the Oregon State University and located in Newport, Oregon
- Hopkins Marine Station, a similar research facility run by Stanford University in Monterey, California
