= Haynes Inlet Bridge =

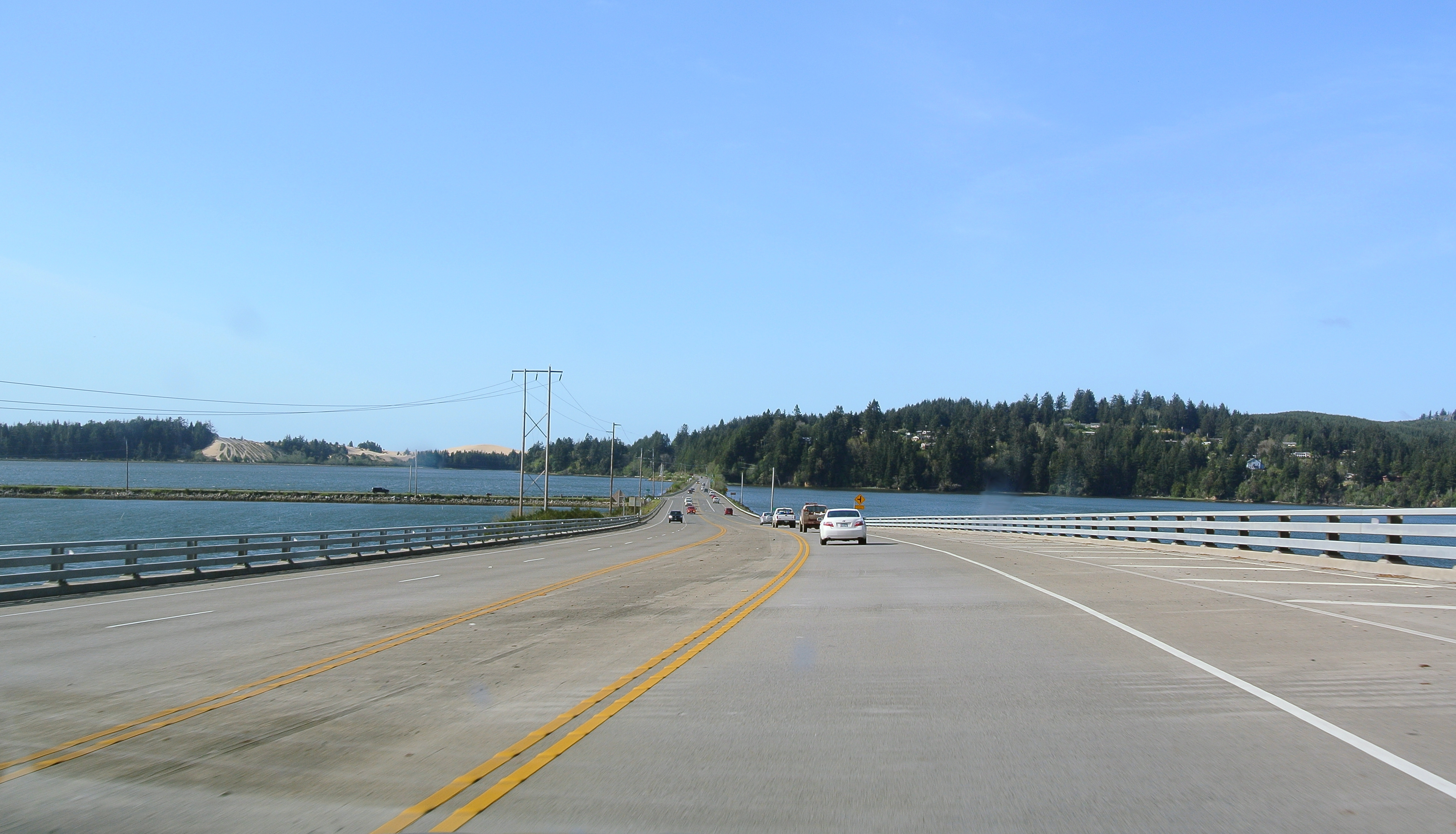
- On Haynes Inlet Bridge, view towards north
- Coordinates: 43.43972°N 124.22000°W
- Carries: US 101
- Crosses: Haynes Inlet
- Locale: North Bend, Oregon, U.S.
- Maintained by: ODOT

Characteristics
- Material: Prestressed concrete, stainless steel reinforcement
- Total length: 775.0 ft (236.2 m)
- Width: 82.7 ft (25.2 m)
- Longest span: 238.9 ft (72.8 m)

History
- Designer: James Bollman
- Construction start: 1999
- Opened: 2004

Haynes Inlet Bridge (or Haynes Inlet Slough Bridge) is a bridge that carries U.S. Route 101 (US 101) over Haynes Inlet.

The arches are cast in place and post-tensioned.

== See also ==
- List of bridges on U.S. Route 101 in Oregon
