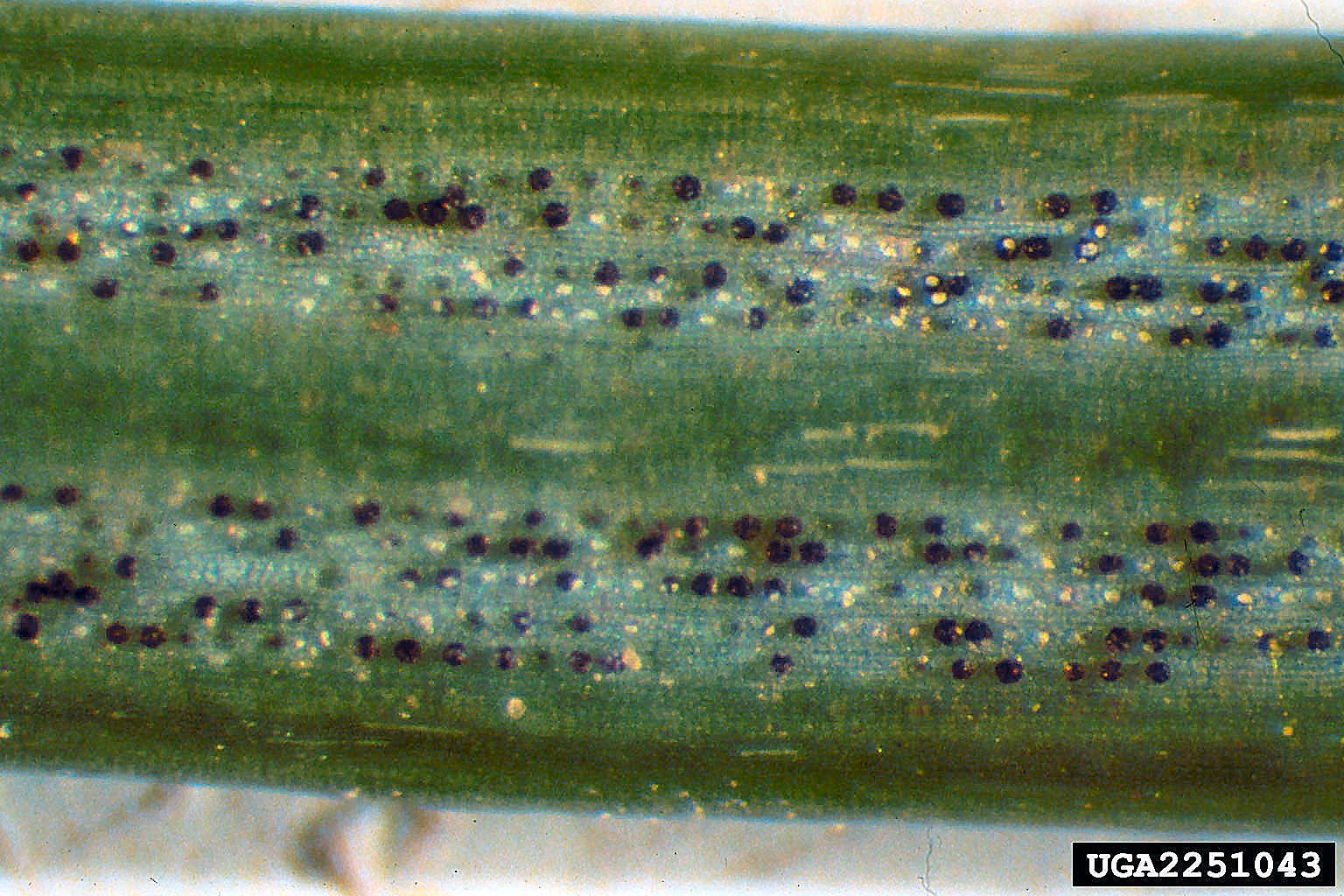
- Fruiting bodies of Nothophaeocryptopus gaeumannii

Scientific classification
- Kingdom: Fungi
- Division: Ascomycota
- Class: Dothideomycetes
- Order: Capnodiales
- Family: Mycosphaerellaceae
- Genus: Nothophaeocryptopus; Videira, C. Nakash. & Crous, 2017

= Nothophaeocryptopus =

Genus of fungi

Nothophaeocryptopus is a genus of fungi which inhabits conifer needles, in the family Mycosphaerellaceae. It includes the important pathogen Nothophaeocryptopus gaeumannii which infects Douglas-fir trees causing the disease known as Swiss needle cast.
