= Hanis language =

Extinct Native American language formerly spoken in Oregon

Hanis
- Coos
- há·nis
- Native to: United States
- Region: Coos Bay, Oregon
- Ethnicity: Hanis people
- Extinct: 1972, with the death of Martha Harney Johnson
- Revival: by 2007
- Language family: Coosan: Hanis

Language codes
- ISO 639-3: csz
- Glottolog: coos1249
- ELP: Hanis
- Map of Coosan languages

- Hanis is classified as Extinct by the UNESCO Atlas of the World's Languages in Danger

Hanis, or Coos, was one of two Coosan languages of Oregon, and the better documented. It was spoken north of the Miluk around the Coos River and Coos Bay. há·nis was the Hanis name for themselves. The last speaker of Hanis was Martha Harney Johnson, who died in 1972. Another speaker was Annie Miner Peterson, who worked with linguist Melville Jacobs to document the language.

As of 2007, classes in Hanis were offered by the Confederated Tribes of Coos, Lower Umpqua and Siuslaw Indians. A book and CD, Hanis for Beginners, were published in 2011, and a companion website is available for tribal members.

== Phonology ==
Vowels /i ɛ a u/ may be long or short; there is also a short /ə/.

Consonants
		Bilabial	Alveolar			Post- alveolar	Velar	Uvular	Glottal
		Bilabial	plain	sibilant	lateral	Post- alveolar	Velar	Uvular	Glottal
Plosive/ Affricate	plain	p	t	ts	tɬ	tʃ	k	q	ʔ
Plosive/ Affricate	aspirated	pʰ	tʰ	tsʰ	tɬʰ	tʃʰ	kʰ	qʰ	
Plosive/ Affricate	ejective	pʼ	tʼ	tsʼ	tɬʼ	tʃʼ	kʼ	qʼ	
Fricative	voiceless			s	ɬ	ʃ	x	χ	h
Fricative	voiced						ɣ		
Sonorant		m	n		l	j	w		

The /p t ts tɬ tʃ k q/ series are optionally voiced. /l m n/ may be syllabic. Stress is phonemic.

Sounds /k kʰ kʼ/ may be heard as palatalized [c cʰ cʼ] when before front vowels. /k kʰ kʼ x h/ may also have labialized equivalents as [kʷ kʷʰ kʼʷ xʷ hʷ].
