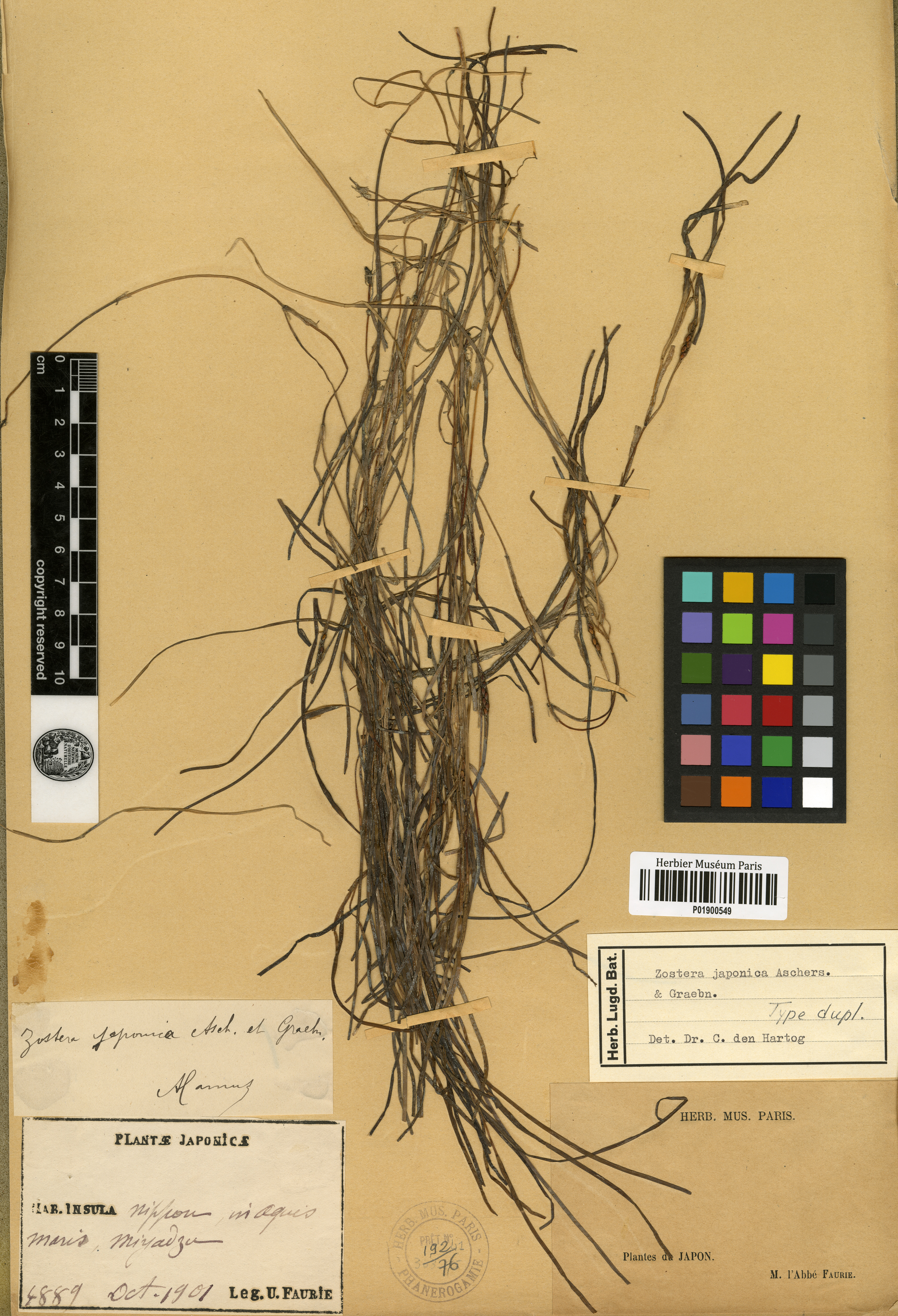
- Zostera japonica

Conservation status
- Least Concern (IUCN 3.1)

Scientific classification
- Kingdom: Plantae
- Clade: Tracheophytes
- Clade: Angiosperms
- Clade: Monocots
- Order: Alismatales
- Family: Zosteraceae
- Genus: Zostera
- Species: Z. japonica

Binomial name
- Zostera japonica Asch. & Graebn

Synonyms
- Nanozostera americana (Hartog) Toml. & Posl.; Nanozostera japonica (Asch. & Graebn.) Toml. & Posl.; Zostera americana Hartog

= Zostera japonica =

Japanese eelgrass

Species of plant

Zostera japonica is a species of aquatic plant in the Zosteraceae family. It is referred to by the common names dwarf eelgrass or Japanese eelgrass, and is native to the seacoast of eastern Asia from Russia to Vietnam, and introduced to the western coast of North America. It is found in the intertidal zone and the shallow subtidal, and grows on sandy, muddy and silty substrates.

== Distribution and habitat ==
It is considered native in the Russian Far East (Sakhalin, Kamchatka, Primorye, and the Kuril Islands), Japan, Korea, China, the Ryukyu Islands, Taiwan and Vietnam. It was first reported as being naturalized in British Columbia and in the US State of Washington, but is now considered invasive as far south as California. It is believed to have been introduced with a shipment of Japanese oysters some time in the first half of the twentieth century. This seagrass is mainly found in sheltered bays where the seabed is sand, mud or silt. It occurs in the intertidal zone and at depths down to about 3 m (10 ft).

== Ecology ==
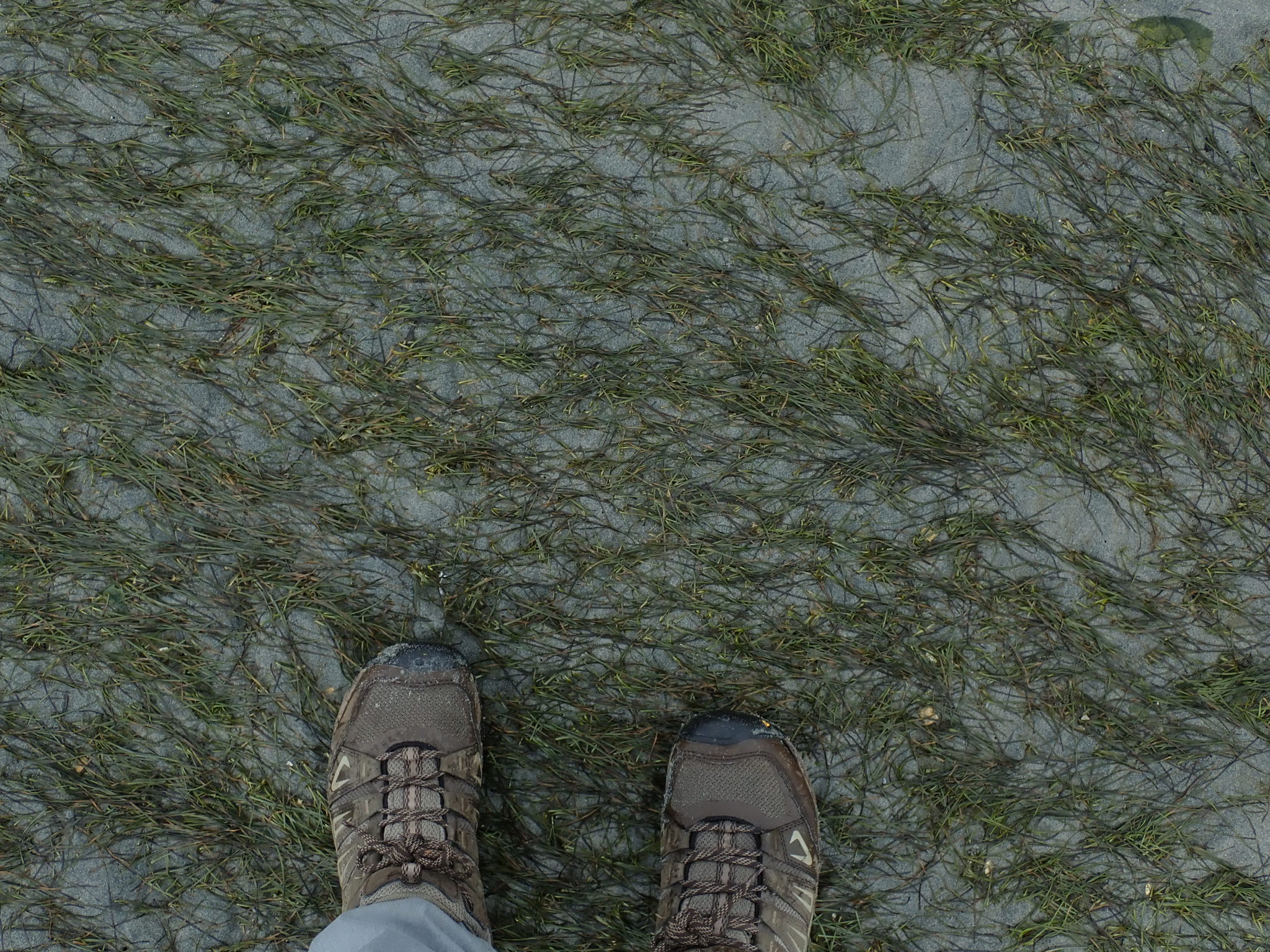
Japanese eelgrass in Canada

Japanese eelgrass is a small species and usually grows on the upper edge of seagrass beds, typically on mudflats exposed at low tide. The plants lose many of their leaves in the winter. In Hong Kong, algae grows on the blades of this seagrass and snails in the species Clithon graze on this epiphytic growth. In a research study, where the snails were excluded from certain areas of seagrass bed, the epiphytic load increased and this had a deleterious effect on the total biomass of the seagrass, reducing the amount of photosynthesis and increasing physical damage from waves and currents. In the presence of the snails, the grass blades were kept cleaner, were less likely to break off and their total biomass was increased.

On the west coast of North America, the non-native Japanese eelgrass is now found in the same habitats as the native common eelgrass (Zostera marina), growing beside it and sometimes displacing it. The habitat in which they both occur is used by economically important shellfish. Further research is needed to clarify the roles of the two species in the habitat and whether any management strategies are needed to protect the native species from the invader. One difference between the two is that Z. marina undergoes microbial decomposition more slowly than does Z. japonica so that nutrients are recycled more quickly with the latter, giving alterations in both total productivity and in the structure of the decomposer community.
