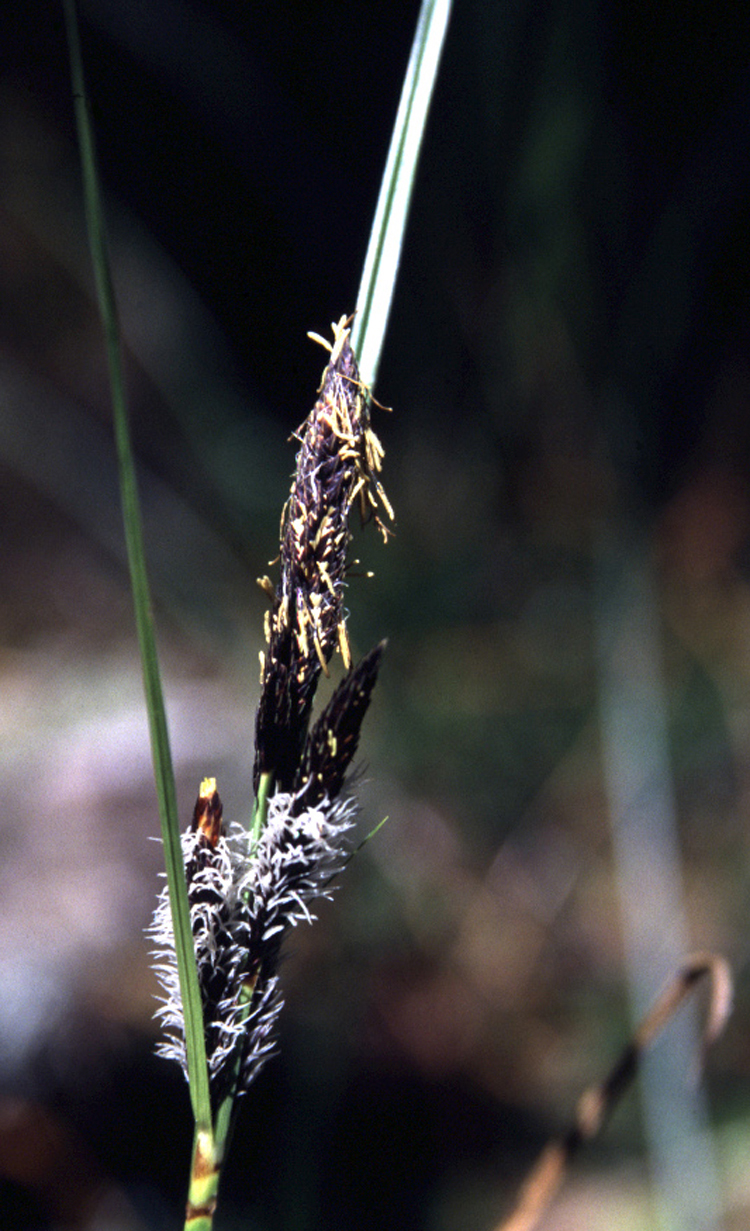

Conservation status
- Least Concern (IUCN 3.1)

Scientific classification
- Kingdom: Plantae
- Clade: Tracheophytes
- Clade: Angiosperms
- Clade: Monocots
- Clade: Commelinids
- Order: Poales
- Family: Cyperaceae
- Genus: Carex
- Species: C. obnupta

Binomial name
- Carex obnupta L.H.Bailey

Synonyms
- Carex magnifica Dewey ex C.B.Clarke

= Carex obnupta =

Species of grass-like plant in the sedge family

Carex obnupta is a species of sedge known by the common name slough sedge.

== Description ==
The plant produces upright, angled stems approaching 1.2 meters in maximum height, growing in beds or colonies from rhizome networks. The inflorescence is a cluster of flower spikes accompanied by a long leaflike bract. The pistillate spikes and sometimes the staminate spikes dangle on peduncles. The fruit is coated by a hard, tough, shiny perigynium which is generally dark in color.

== Distribution and habitat ==
Carex obnupta is native to western North America from British Columbia to California where it grows abundantly in wet, often saline habitat such as wetlands.
