= Elizabeth Jacobs (anthropologist) =

American anthropologist

Elizabeth Derr Jacobs
- Born: Elizabeth Louise Derr; 1903; Heron, Montana
- Died: May 21, 1983 (aged 79–80)
- Education: University of Washington
- Occupation: Anthropologist
- Known for: Nehalem Tillamook culture
- Spouse: Melville Jacobs

Elizabeth Derr Jacobs (1903 – May 21, 1983) was an anthropologist specializing in the native cultures of the Pacific Northwest. She is known particularly for her work on the Nehalem Tillamook, the northernmost subgroup of the Tillamook, whom she studied in the 1930s. She then turned away from anthropology to pursue a career as a psychotherapist, returning to anthropology after her retirement in 1975.

== Life and work ==
Born in 1903 as Elizabeth Louise Derr in Heron, Montana, she grew up near Clark Fork, Idaho and earned a bachelor's degree in English from the University of Washington in Seattle in 1930. With a new focus on pre-med, she took two courses before changing her mind again. Hoping to become a psychiatrist, she attended the University of Minnesota Medical School in Duluth in 1932–1933, before her funds ran out, which caused her to leave her university studies entirely. She returned to Seattle and to her University of Washington anthropologist-husband Melville Jacobs, whom she had married on January 3, 1931. The couple were members of the Communist Party USA until the mid-1940s.

=== Anthropology ===
Jacobs had no formal training in anthropology but came to it via her marriage to anthropologist Melville Jacobs. As a result, she sometimes neglected topics of traditional interest to anthropologists, such as place names, ethnobiology, and material culture and focused on topics traditionally given less attention, particularly the lives of women.

During the summer of 1933, she accompanied Melville on his yearly field research trip among the Indians of western Oregon. According to Seaburg, the "experience changed her life."

Melville introduced Elizabeth to her extraordinary Nehalem Tillamook consultant, Clara Pearson, and Elizabeth spent about a month in 1933 recording ethnographic notes. Melville taught her phonetic transcription for writing the Native words, and in the evenings they went over her field notes, with Melville suggesting possible questions for the next day's session.

A reviewer of one of her texts says,

Working with her extraordinarily able Nehalem Tillamook consultant Clara Pearson, Jacobs recorded extensive ethnographic and folkloric materials that far surpass in quality and quantity the Tillamook research of previous investigators. Jacobs' collaboration with Pearson eventually resulted in the publication of "Nehalem Tillamook Tales, an exceptional collection of myths and tales recorded in English.

Elizabeth Jacobs worked with Clara Pearson again in 1934 for two weeks in 1934 and used that opportunity to record Pearson's collection of Nehalem myths and folktales, which resulted in Nehalem Tillamook Tales, published in 1959, then the ethnography released in 2003

=== Psychotherapy ===
In the 1940s. Elizabeth returned to the University of Washington to attend the School of Social Work. She earned her master's in psychiatric social work in 1949.

Melvin died in 1971 and Elizabeth dedicated much of her later years to her work as a psychotherapist. Before his death, the couple had planned to establish a anthropological research fund as part of their estate. Elizabeth began supporting anthropological projects that she thought Melvin would appreciate. Eventually, a board was appointed and The Jacobs Research Fund for The University of Washington was established. The research fund supports anthropological and linguistic research done on living Native Americans, documenting the evolving languages and cultures of Native American peoples.

She died in 1983.

== Select publications ==
- Nehalem Tillamook Tales. (1959) University of Oregon Monographs, Studies in Anthropology No. 5. Eugene: University of Oregon Press.
- French, K. S. (1960). ETHNOLOGY AND ETHNOGRAPHY: Nehalem Tillamook Tales. Recorded by Elizabeth Derr Jacobs, edited by Melville Jacobs.
- Jacobs, E. D. (2003). The Nehalem Tillamook: An Ethnography. Oregon State University Press.
- The Nehalem Tillamook: An Ethnography. (2004) Edited by William R. Seaburg. Oregon State University Press, Corvallis.
- Lewis, D. G. (2007). Pitch Woman and Other Stories: Oral Traditions of Coquelle Thompson, Upper Coquille Athabaskan Indian by William Seaburg, Elizabeth D. Jacobs. Oregon Historical Quarterly, 108(3), 490–492.
