= Coosa =

Coosa may refer to:

- Coosa, Mississippi
- Coosa River
- Coosa County, Alabama
- Coosa chiefdom, which was visited by Hernando de Soto.
- Coosa High School, a secondary school in Floyd County, Ga.

== See also ==
- Coosan languages of the southern Oregon coast
