= Coos Bay =

Estuary in Oregon, United States

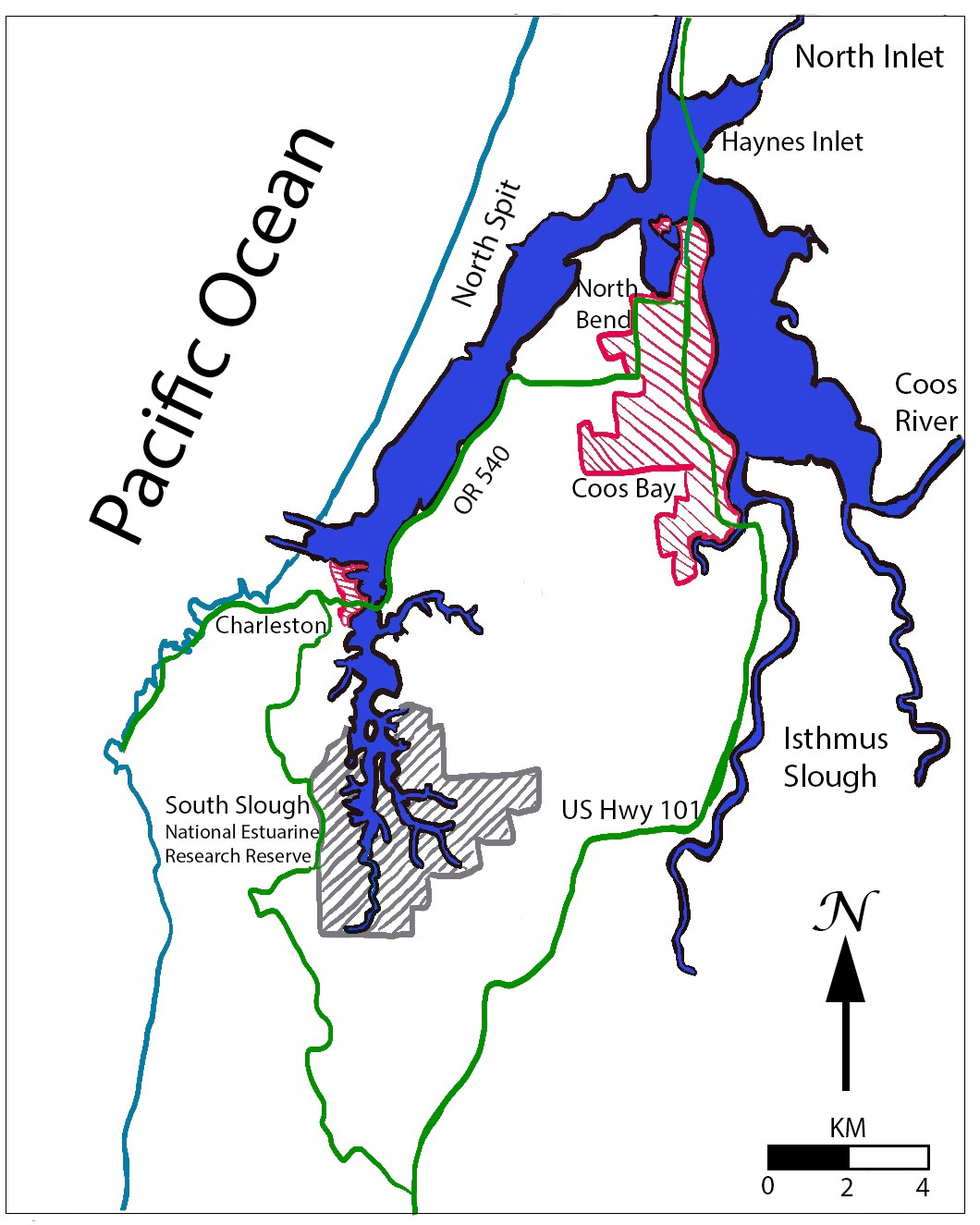
A map of Coos Bay, with key locations labelled. This map is based on figure 1.20 from Rumrill, (2008). "The Ecology of the South Slough Estuary: Site Profile of the South Slough National Estuarine Research Reserve."

Coos Bay (Coos language: Atsixiis or Hanisich) is an estuary where the Coos River enters the Pacific Ocean, the estuary is approximately 12 miles long and up to two miles wide. It is the largest estuary completely within Oregon state lines. The Coos Bay watershed covers an area of about 600 square miles and is located in northern Coos County, Oregon, in the United States. The Coos River, which begins in the Oregon Coast Range, enters the bay from the east. From Coos River, the bay forms a sharp loop northward before arching back to the south and out to the Pacific Ocean. Haynes Inlet enters the top of this loop. South Slough branches off from the bay directly before its entrance into the Pacific Ocean. The bay was formed when sea levels rose over 20,000 years ago at the end of the Last Glacial Maximum, flooding the mouth of the Coos River. Coos Bay is Oregon's most important coastal industrial center and international shipping port, with close ties to San Francisco, the Columbia River, Puget Sound and other major ports of the Pacific rim.

The city of Coos Bay is located on the peninsula formed by the inside of the loop of the bay. Charleston is located near the entrance to South Slough. Many of the commercial fishing and recreational fishing boats that call Coos Bay home are docked in Charleston. North Bend, located at the apex of the peninsula, is home to the Southwest Oregon Regional Airport.

The estuary has been altered over 150 years of modern anthropogenic use. Dredging, deepening, river diversion and spoil disposal has led to physical, biological, and chemical changes to the system over time.

== Geology ==
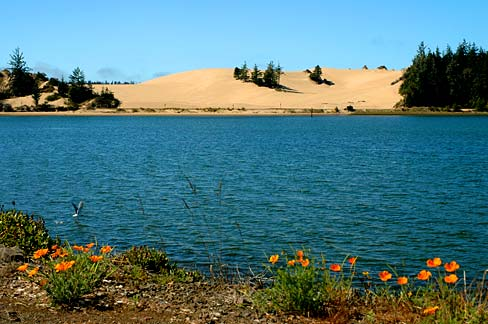
Coos Bay and its nearby sand dunes

The bedrock of the greater Coos Bay region was formed from the Mesozoic through the Pliocene eras out of volcanic rock, sedimentary rock, and igneous rock intrusions. The area's geologic history is highlighted by tectonic interaction between oceanic and continental plates. Subduction and abduction of the oceanic plate with the North American Plate has led to a thicker crust in Southwestern Oregon. The Empire Formation, on which Coos Bay lies, is mainly composed of sedimentary rock created by marine sediments that were deposited offshore before being pushed onshore over millions of years. This process results in the oldest rock being furthest east. East of the bay, and in the Coos River watershed, the bedrock is the oldest, formed during the Eocene. The center of Coos Bay, where the towns of North Bend and Coos Bay sit, was formed during the late Pliocene or early Pleistocene. The North Spit, the most western area bordering the ocean, is composed of sand dunes. These formed much more recently as sand was deposited along the coast after eroding from other areas. By studying the transition from peaty to muddy intertidal sediment and the associated microfossils in the estuary, researchers were able to determine 10 instances of sudden rises in sea level as a potential proxy for earthquakes, including two dating 1,700 and 2,300 years ago when sea level rose by at least half a meter. This same study also found evidence of a large earthquake 300 years ago along the great plate boundary. In addition, sea level rise 20,000 years ago drowned the prior river mouth, creating Coos Bay estuary as we know today.

== Physical geography ==
=== Tidal flats ===
Tidal flats are areas where sediments that are deposited from rivers and tides accumulate. Coos Bay is primarily made up of mud and sand flats that form in areas of low tidal activity. The estuary covers 10,973 acres at mean high water and 5,810 acres at mean low water, and about 48% of the watershed is tideland. Tidal effects can extend up the tributaries 27 miles from the ocean. Of the tidal flats in Coos Bay estuary, organic content is highest in the mudflats (8-18% of dry weight, 19.77 ppt) compared to the sandflats (1-2% of dry weight, <0.1 ppt). These areas tend to lack visible vegetation, but do support benthic diatoms, mats of green and yellow green algae, and eelgrass beds (Zostera marina and Z. japonica). Tidal flats in the estuary have a network of shallow channels that allow water to drain when the flats are above water, and when submerged, allow water and sediment to pass through the flats. In this way, the flats act as a barrier that slows the water passing through, reduces how much water can flow through, and encourages the deposition, re-suspension, and transport of particles with the tides as the flats are constantly experiencing deposition and erosion.

The mudflats are primarily made of a mix of medium and fine-grained sands, silts, and clays, while the sandflats are primarily made of medium-sized sand grains derived from the erosion of the nearby cliffs. The higher organic content of mudflats is composed of plant and animal tissues and wastes, diatoms, bacteria, and flocculants, chemicals that pull suspended particles out of the water to form into sediment. The environment a few centimeters below the sediment doesn't have enough oxygen, so sulfate-reducing bacteria live there, breaking down organic matter and producing hydrogen sulfide, giving the mudflats the classic "rotten egg" smell.

=== Weather ===
The mild marine climate of Coos Bay is classified as Csb or a Temperate Mediterranean Climate zone and is heavily influenced by the Pacific Ocean and precipitation from the Coast Range. Regional weather consists of a cool, wet season in the winter (November through March) with an average annual rainfall of 56 inches, and a mild, dry season in the summer (May through September) with an average rainfall of less than 4 inches. Runoff follows this same pattern, with approximately one month of lag. Air temperatures range from 40° to 75 °F. Winter storms lead to accumulation of winter precipitation and which is a significant input of fresh water and sediments.

=== Fluvial geomorphology ===
Fluvial geomorphology is the study of the way rivers move through and affect their surrounding landscape. For an estuary, this involves the tributaries and their flow rates, bottom topography, water discharge and the drainage basin, and sedimentation and deposition.

==== Tributaries ====
Thirty tributaries enter the bay, including 13 freshwater sources, the Coos River being the largest freshwater source. About 1 m^{3}/s of freshwater is released by the Coos River into the estuary in the summer and >300 m^{3}/s in the winter. These waters travel through areas of heavy logging and limited agriculture, originating from the Coastal Range. The main channel of the estuary follows the north–south trending anticline (an arch-like fold in the ground), ending in the Isthmus Slough, Catching Slough, Haynes Inlet, and Coos River; while southward, the South Slough follows the syncline (an inward curve in the ground). The sediment accumulation rate is approximately 2.3–9 mm/yr in a 0.9-m deep flat in South Slough over a 300-year timescale. This is greater than the sea level is expected to rise locally, 1.10 ± 0.73 mm/yr.

Coos Bay Tributaries (1974)
Stream	Length (miles)	Drainage Area (square miles)	Max Freshwater Annual Yield (ac-ft)	Min Freshwater Annual Yield (ac-ft)	Mean Freshwater Annual Yield (ac-ft)
Coos River	5.5	415	2,200,000	1,130,000	1,590,000
South Fork Coos River	31.3	254	1,280,000	660,000	930,000
Millicoma River	8.7	151	880,000	450,000	630,000
East Fork Millicoma River	23.9	79	460,000	230,000	330,000
West Fork Millicoma River	34.9	55	-	-	-

==== Bottom topography ====
Coos Bay is considered a drowned river valley estuary, meaning it was a river valley that was flooded as sea levels rose. The shallow and narrow V-shaped topography of Coos Bay is more varied across the channel than it is longitudinally. It is deepest near the mouth of the estuary, where the bottom is uniform, and the slope leading to this decline is gentle. This topography, coupled with high tidal range and low runoff, allows for lateral and vertical mixing.

==== Water discharge and drainage basin ====
Annually, Coos Bay is estimated to discharge 2.2 million acre-feet of fresh water, with a yearly maximum of 3,044,000 ac-ft and a minimum of 1,560,000 ac-ft, based on extrapolations of fresh water inflow measured at the West Fork of the Millicoma River mouth in 1974. According to a US Department of Commerce survey from 1954 to 1970, freshwater inflow enters the estuary at a rate of 90 cubic feet per second (cfs) in the summer and 5500 cfs in the winter with an average of 2200 cfs. The drainage basin consists of forest, cropland, and rangelands. The South Slough watershed alone has a drainage area of about 7,932 ha.

Coos Bay Tributary Flow Rates
Stream (at mouth)	Drainage area (square miles)	High average monthly flow (cfs)	Low average monthly flow (cfs)	Mean average monthly flow (cfs)
Coos River	415	5,500 (Feb)	90 (Aug, Sept)	2,200
South Fork Coos River	254	3,300 (Feb)	50 (Aug, Sept)	1,300
Millicoma River	151	2,200 (Feb)	30 (Sept)	870

==== Sedimentation and deposition ====
As of 1975, the Coos Bay has experienced a greater influx of sediment than output. Such sediment includes silt from drainage basin erosion, and various sands (marine sand, dune sand, South Slough cliff sand) due to erosion in the surrounding areas. Sediments are formed and moved via streams, littoral drift, or transport of sediments along a coastline parallel to the shore, processes due to wind activity, and erosion. Sediment grains increase in size with depth and decrease in size when moving further into the estuary, likely because tidal currents are less strong further in and can no longer carry larger particles. To keep the estuary fit as a navigation channel, an average of 1.65 million square yards of material was removed annually by the US Army Corps of Engineers prior to the start of the Deep-Draft Navigation Project. Sediments input averages 72,000 tons annually.

Modeling of Coos Bay sediment movement compared to historical patterns reveals that suspended-sediment concentrations and sediment retention has increased in the estuary over time as dredging, river diversion, construction and spoils disposal continues. As a result of this development, sediment transport has been diverted into the central navigation channel, where more sediment is accumulating. Tidal flat sediment retention has also increased.

== Biogeochemistry ==
=== Tides and upwelling ===
Seasonal winds cause tides and upwelling that influence nutrients and the biogeochemistry of Coos Bay estuary. One third of macrophyte production in the estuary is attributed to upwelling. In the summer, wind primarily comes from the North along the Oregon coast, bringing up nutrient-rich deep water and boosting primary production. Strong tides then move these upwelled nutrients further upstream, which stimulates primary production in the estuary. Oregon experiences mixed semi-diurnal tides, meaning there are two high and two low tides per day which differ in height. In 2000, the difference in semi-diurnal high and low tides was on average 0.3-0.5 m, and the average tidal amplitude between Mean Higher High Water and Mean Lower Low Water was about 2.1 m. The tidal prism, or the amount of water between mean high tide and mean low tide, accounts for 30% of the estuary's volume. Estuary mixing and stratification is dependent on the tidal flux and river flux. Circulation patterns are also tidally-influenced. In the summer, the estuary is well-mixed, but in the winter it is highly stratified. Furthermore, in the summer months saltwater influence is greater as freshwater flow into the estuary is minimal. Following anthropogenic deepening and widening, the estuary has a 33% greater mean tidal amplitude and 18% more salinity intrusion length.

=== Nutrients ===
Nitrogen inputs vary seasonally and along the salinity gradient. Increased precipitation during the wet season is a major input of land-based nitrogen, as is the watershed associated with agricultural nitrogen runoff and red alder nitrogen fixation. Oregon Coast Range streams typically contain higher amounts of nitrate compared to other Pacific Northwest streams due to the healthy population of red alder trees capable of fixing nitrogen. During the dry season, the major input of nitrogen comes from the ocean following upwelling events bringing nutrients like nitrogen into the estuary. In the late summer and fall, nitrate concentrations measured at low tide are varied, with highest concentrations in the tidal regions of the estuary, and lowest at the riverine ends. In the winter, during peak freshwater inputs, nitrate concentrations are high and fairly uniform throughout the estuary. This indicates that in the dry season, nutrient sources come from the Ocean, while in the wet season, nutrients are coming in with the freshwater. During summer months when dry conditions persist and upwelling is occurring, the primary source of phosphorus is from the ocean. Thus, phosphorus concentrations also vary depending on location in the estuary, on the ocean end or riverine end.

=== Chemistry ===
Roughly half of the total organic matter within the Coos Bay estuary is stored organic carbon within sediments. Clay and silt particles typically have the highest concentrations of organic matter associated with them. Photosynthesis by primary producers draws down atmospheric carbon dioxide and eventual burial of primary producers such as eelgrass and algae lead to long term burial of carbon in estuarine sediments. Estuaries can provide an important sink for increasing global carbon dioxide concentrations as estuary sediments can store carbon rapidly depending on tidal fluxes.

Similar to nitrogen and phosphorus, chlorophyll is dependent on upwelling and tidal mixing and varies along the salinity gradient. These physical processes influence estuarine chlorophyll by either directly transporting chlorophyll associated with plants from coastal waters into the estuary or by transporting recently upwelled, nutrient rich water, into the estuary which triggers primary production.

Temperature, salinity, and dissolved oxygen levels vary according to wind forcing, river discharge and tides, with a variety of timescales from daily (tidal) to yearly. These values [ambiguous] and pH are also monitored at various locations throughout South Slough. In the wet winter season (December - February), the bottom water measured in the tidal waters of South Slough at Valino Island tends to be relatively cold, with temperatures ranging from 5° to 11 °C and highly variable salinity (0-20 psu). In the spring (March–May), temperatures increase to 13° to 23 °C and salinity becomes more stabilized (27 ± 4 psu) due to is less freshwater input. During the dry summer season (June - August), bottom temperatures increase to around 15 °C and salinity increases with less variability (31 ± 3 psu). In the fall (September - November) temperatures drop and salinity becomes more variable (30 ± 5 psu). Similar patterns are expected throughout the estuary, although location within the estuary will alter dynamics and values.

Seasonal variations of dissolved oxygen include relative highs in the fall and winter (Dec - Jan; >8 mg L^{−1}) with fluctuations across the estuary and lows in the spring and summer during the upwelling season (Apr - Sep; close to 5 mg L^{−1}), with some variation. Lowest dissolved oxygen levels are found in the mouth in the spring and at the riverine end in late summer and early fall. While upwelling does bring oxygen-poor water to the surface, upwelling strength alone is not a good predictor of low dissolved oxygen levels; the influence of other physical and biological factors are also needed to explain patterns of oxygen concentration. Overall, there is minimal likelihood of hypoxia due to rapid tidal exchange and shallow waters, based on the established dissolved oxygen content of the estuary throughout the year.

South Slough did not exhibit any distinct seasonal pattern in pH at any of the monitoring sites, instead remaining within 7.5 and 8.2 year round at Valino Island. pH tends to be lower in the more riverine locations, between 6.5 and 7.8. However, there were strong daily fluctuations in pH following the tides and daylight at all monitoring sites, as shown by strong correlation with conductivity and salinity.

Generally, levels of nutrients, salinity, specific conductivity and chlorophyll are at healthy levels in the estuary, as are water temperature, oxygen, and pH.

=== Pollution ===
Historically, Coos Bay has been subject to a range of pollutants from different sources from logging mills, boat manufacturing, and runoff. The area is also particularly vulnerable to any oil or chemical spills at the International Port of Coos Bay, due to its strong tidal currents. The Oregon Department of Environmental Quality (DEQ) began collecting samples of pollutions and contaminants in the late 1990s, and found that one of the largest sources of pollution into the Coos Bay estuary had been from tributyltin (TBT) sourced from two active shipyards within the estuary. TBT became an environmental concern in the late 1980s after commercial oyster farmers began noticing shell deformities. After sample results showed toxic levels of TBT, the two shipyards worked with the DEQ to clean up contaminated sediments and implement more environmentally conscience practices, which allowed Coos Bay to avoid being listed as a superfund site. Southeast of Coos Bay is one of the state's largest coal fields with an area of 250 sq miles. Groundwater seepage from this coal field historically has also been a source of pollution.

== Ecology and biology ==
=== Plant life ===
Plant life in Coos Bay supports biodiverse ecosystems contained within this watershed, ranging from forests in the uplands to eelgrass meadows in the bay. The forested regions of Coos Bay have been logged at least once in the past century, and some of these areas were replanted solely with Douglas fir trees. Sitka spruce, western hemlock, and Port Orford cedar trees can also be found in Coos Bay watershed, ranging from 15- to 75-years of age. Key upland area plant life also include evergreen huckleberry, Pacific sword fern, salal and salmonberry. Fresh and tidal marsh plants include baltic rush, fleshy jaumea, Lyngby's sedge, Pacific silverweed, pickleweed, salt grass, seaside arrowgrass, skunk cabbage, Slough sedge, salt-marsh bird's beak, western bog lily, and tufted hairgrass.

==== Eelgrass ====
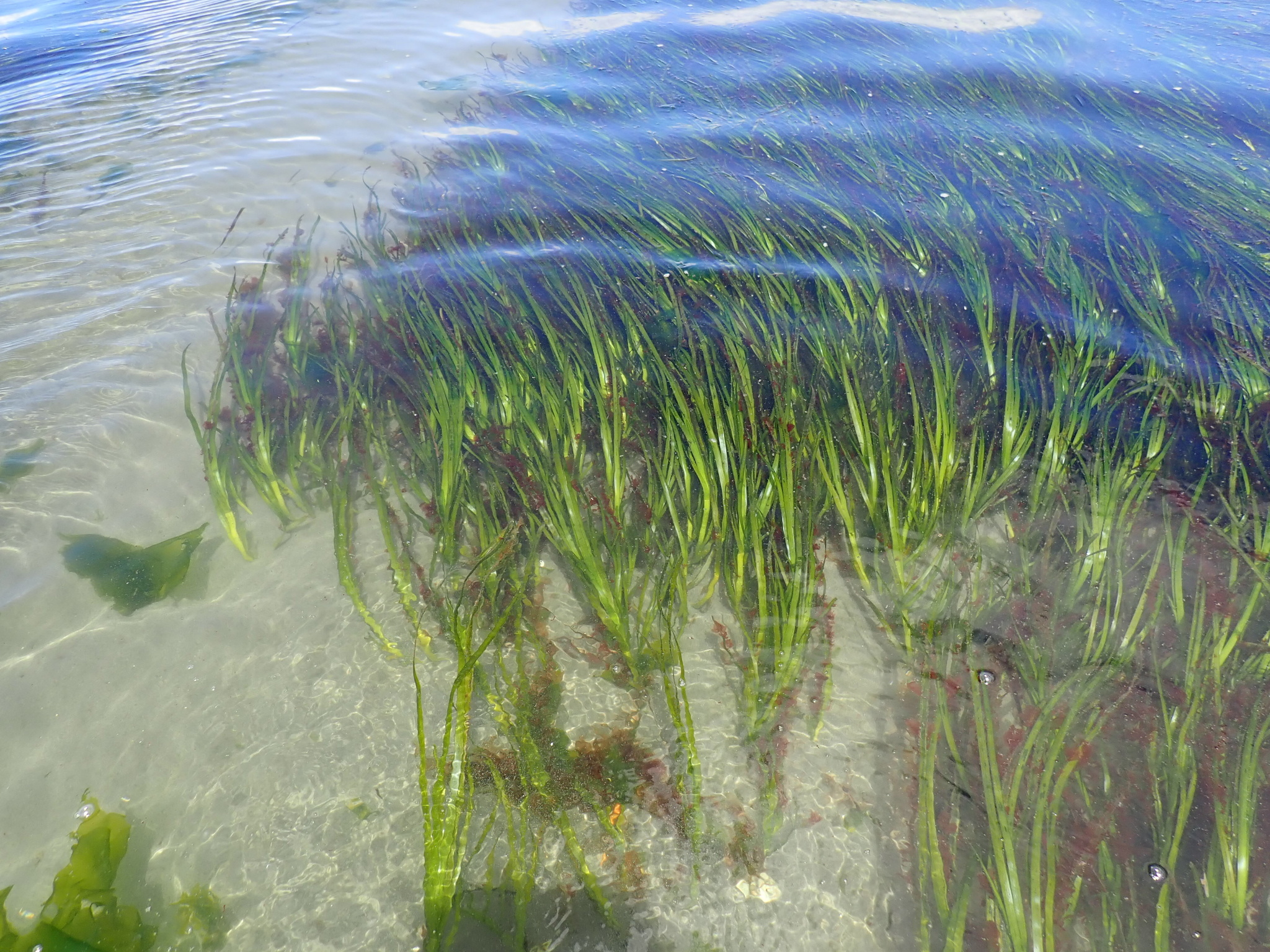
A photograph of an eelgrass (Zostera marina) bed like those found in Coos Bay, taken in Puget Sound, Edmonds, Washington state, USA (June 7, 2020) by John Brew.

In the aquatic regions, eelgrass (Zostera marina and Zostera japonica) covers about 1,400 acres of Coos Bay. Eelgrass beds are a vital habitat to many species of invertebrates. Additionally, the eelgrass affects the flow of water through the area, stabilizes the sediment, exchanges nutrients between the water column and sediments, and is a source of food for consumers. The beds provide cover for predators and prey alike, including ecologically or economically important fish (see Fish section below).

Eelgrasses are clearly important to the ecosystem, but they are also vulnerable to disruption. During a study in 1996, the density of eelgrass (Zostera marina) plants decreased by 59.4% over a period of 75 days on plots undergoing mariculture of Pacific oysters compared to only a 28.8% reduction in the control plots. The Z. marina also decreased in spatial cover under treatment conditions, by 70.7% in high elevations and 36.7% in lower intertidal regions of the study. Following removal of these mariculture practices, Z. marina beds struggled to recover, and recovery depended most on how many Z. marina plants there were at the start of recovery, rather than on new growth. However, transplanted Z. marina did recover better than plots left to recover on their own. Aside from anthropogenic influences, eelgrass is also affected by other factors. A study on Z. marina meadows in Coos Bay from 1998 to 2001 found that Z. marina is more dense in areas with higher salinity and lower temperature; gradients which vary within the estuary depending on location. Over the course of the study, which includes the transition from El Niño to La Niña, leading to warmer winters and cooler summers, eelgrass density, biomass, and flowering all increased.

Japanese eelgrass (Zostera japonica) is an invasive species, likely introduced during commercial oyster cultivation in 1970 or earlier. The distribution of Z. japonica has spread from the upper reaches of South Slough in the 1970s into the middle region of the estuary by 1987. By the early 1980s it is everywhere in the estuary, most commonly in the mid intertidal zone. Z. japonica converts unvegetated mudflats into eelgrass beds, leading to significant changes in the species composition and abundance of invertebrate communities of the area. Overall, species richness was significantly higher in Z. japonica dominated areas than it was before the invasion.

=== Algae ===
A variety of algae can be found in Coos Bay. Micro-algae or Phytoplankton, such as diatoms, are abundant. Coos Bay has some of the highest primary productivity within west coast estuaries. In the lower part of the bay, species such as Chaetoceros, Skeletonema, and Thalassiosira are found. In the upper part of the bay, species such as Melosira and Skeletonema are found. As of 1973, zooplankton were most abundant near the ocean, and numbers tended to decrease further into the bay. Neritic (swimming) species were found in the lower parts of the estuary. In a typical year, there is a small bloom of diatoms in the late winter and early spring before heavy grazing pressure by the zooplankton limits overall abundance. Lack of sunlight limits diatom growth in the fall and winter. Most algae are found at the mouth of the bay, and notably there is a shift in species from marine to brackish water plants here. Kelp beds, specifically those of bull kelp (Nereocystis leutkeana), are found in the bay as well.

=== Fish ===
Coos Bay provides habitat for both residential and anadromous fish. The South Slough is an essential nursery environment for many marine fish in their larval and juvenile life stages. Near the mouth of the bay, perch, sculpin, and rockfish are found. Surveys in the South Slough, the most commonly studied portion of Coos Bay, have shown that Shiner perch are the most abundant fish in the estuary. Shiner perch comprise 76% of fish caught by seine, and typically have a strong association with the eelgrass beds. Staghorn sculpin are another dominant species. Many of the residential species, Shiner perch included, move into the tidal flats during flood tides. Overall, the fish biomass abundance decreases with increasing distance from the ocean. Coho salmon, Chinook salmon, Steelhead, Coastal cutthroat trout, Striped bass, Pacific lampreys, Western brook lampreys and American shad all migrate through Coos Bay during different times of the year. The Coos Bay estuary provides critical habitat for many of the juveniles of these species that have migrated upriver to spawn. Historically, White sturgeon, Green sturgeon, and Chum Salmon could also be found in Coos Bay.

=== Shellfish ===
Some of Oregon's most productive shellfishing is in Coos Bay. Coos Bay is Oregon's largest bay, and the lower part of the bay offers many shellfishing opportunities such as crabbing and clamming. The lower bay is the area that extends from the airport to the ocean entrance, and is marine dominated (meaning there is little freshwater influence). Some popular, easily accessible clamming spots are along Cape Arago highway, where recreational clammers can dig for gaper and butter clams, in the extensive mud flats during low tide. Gaper, Cockle, Butter, Littleneck, Razor and Softshell Clams have all been found in the bay. Various species of clams were commercially harvested up to 1985. Dungeness crab are also frequently caught by recreational fishermen inside the bay. Ghost and mud shrimp are also found in the tidal flats and are harvested by both recreational and commercial fishermen for use as bait.

In the South Slough, Polychaetes (e.g. annelid worms) comprise 38% of the genera found, making them the most diverse in the ecosystem. In contrast, Decapods (e.g. crabs) comprise only 16%, and Bivalves (e.g. clams) only 13%. Generally, species composition decreases with increasing distance from the ocean.

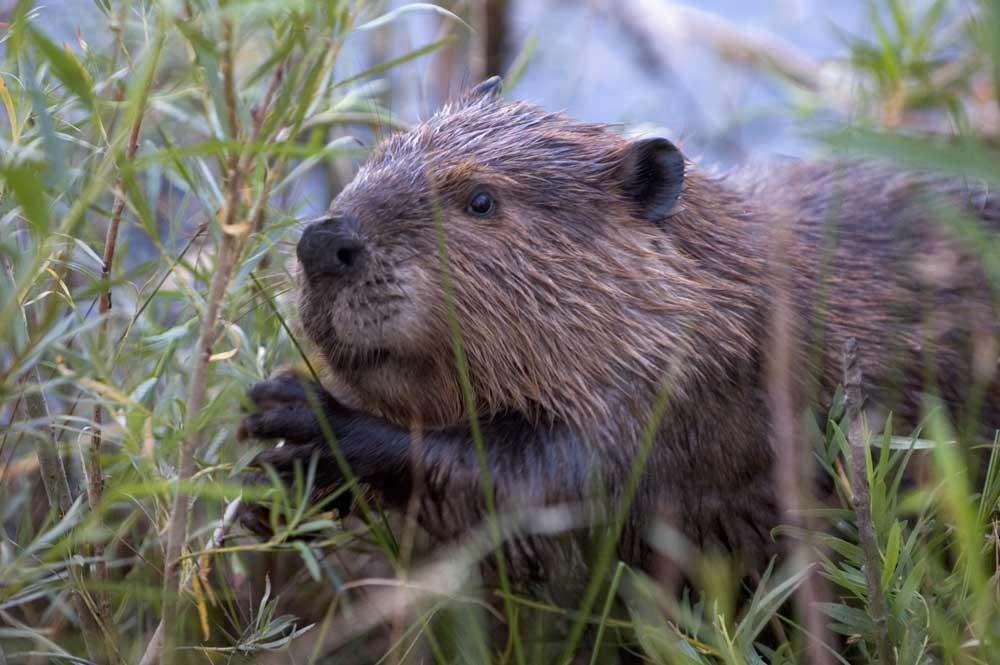
American Beavers can also be found in Coos Bay estuary.

=== Wildlife ===
Mallard Ducks, Pintail Ducks, Widgeon, Marbled murrelet, and Coot all live in the estuaries. The more migratory species of Canvasback ducks, Pintail ducks, and Black Brant winter in the estuaries. Many of the seabirds typically found along Oregon's coast such as pelicans and gulls can also be seen in the bay. Seals and sea lions can typically be seen in the marine dominated zones. River otters can be found further up in the estuary. The fresh and tidal marshes are home to American beavers. Roosevelt elk live in the uplands.

=== Tidal marshes ===
Tidal marshes are marshes that are found along the coast and experience regular tidal flooding and draining. They are important because they provide protection against storm surges, reduce erosion, improve water quality, support a biodiverse ecosystem, and provide opportunities for recreation, which boosts the local economy. The resilience of a tidal marsh depends on the vegetation types and their location in the tidal frame, exposure to stressors, surrounding land use, and if there is enough space for migration. The soils of tidal marshes tend to be salty and hypoxic, with vegetation adapted for regular precipitation and tidal flooding. These areas are especially vulnerable to changes in these systems, especially rising sea levels. The National Oceanic and Atmospheric Administration and the National Estuarine Research Reserve System work together to assess the resilience of tidal marshes around the country and provide recommendations for their management and conservation. Coos Bay is composed of several types of tidal marshes, according to reports from 1974, 1979, and 2021:

The low sand marsh is mainly sandy, but may have silt and mud. This marsh type gently slopes at the edges into the surrounding area. Commonly found plants include Pickleweed, Seaside arrowgrass, Desert saltgrass, Three-Square rush, Jaumea, Dwarf hairgrass, Sea plantain, Paintbrush orthocarpus, Glaux maritima, Carex lyngbyei, and Tufted hairgrass. The low silt marsh is generally silty and muddy and is lacking in channels for tidal drainage. Commonly found plants include Triglochin maritirh, Scirpus robustus, Carex, Jaumea, Spergularia, Juncus lescurii, and Cotula coronopifolia. The sedge marsh is composed of low and high marshes which are likely to have diffuse tidal drainage and channels up to four feet high, respectively. Commonly found plants include Carex lynghyei, Triglochin, Deschampsia caespitosa, and Hordeum nodosum. The immature high marsh is easily identified as it is flat and sits a few feet above the surrounding mudflats. The immature high marsh also has deep channels that drain it. Commonly found plants include Carex, Deschampsia, Hordeum, Juncus lesccurii, Potentilla pacifica, Distichlis, Artiplex natula, and Agrostis alba. The mature high marsh is typically higher than the immature high marsh and it contains underground drainage channels. Commonly found plants include Remex occidentalis, Grindelia stricta, Trifolium wormskjoldii, Vicia gigantea, and Lathyrus japonicus. The bulrush-sedge marsh is typically found on the banks of a river or slough, particularly one with freshwater. Commonly plants include Scirpus validus and Carex lyngbyei. The diked marsh has broad variability as this is not a "natural" type of marsh. Instead, it is formed when saltwater is cut off from entering the former marsh. Most marshes found in Coos Bay were likely high or immature high marshes, before they were diked and used for pasture land. Saltwater plants, over time, will be replaced by freshwater plants. One saltwater plant that may remain is Juncus lescurii. The replacement plants, however, include grasses, shrubs, buttercups, herbs, alders, and other trees. The surge plain is the result of overflowing streams that were dammed, therefore also has broad variability.

Area of Coos Bay Marshes (1974)
Marsh Type	Area (acres)
Low silt marsh	71.6
Low sand marsh	289.1
Immature high marsh	1000.5
Mature high marsh	97.5
Sedge marsh	353.5
Bullrush and sedge marsh	149.8
Diked Marsh	3942.9
Surge plain	285.0
Total undiked marsh	1951.9
Total diked marsh	3942.9

=== South Slough ===
The South Slough, a sub-basin of the Coos watershed, is particularly well studied. The South Slough National Estuarine Research Reserve, spanning 4,771 acres, was the first estuary protected by the National Estuarine Research Reserve in 1974. Since then, the estuary and surrounding watershed have been constantly monitored by the National Oceanic and Atmospheric Administration and the Oregon Department of State Lands. Monitoring includes both water quality, ecosystem surveys, and measurements of resilience. The National Oceanic and Atmospheric Administration and the National Estuarine Research Reserve System rated South Slough as more vulnerable than the national average because its tidal range is small and most of the vegetation is below the mean tide. Additionally, most of the edges of the marsh are un-vegetated. However, South Slough was rated higher than average for adaptive capacity because there is a lot of space for marsh migration as sea levels rise; recommendations for management include protecting these surrounding areas.

The diverse ecosystems that encompass the South Slough Reserve include salt marshes, eelgrass beds, sand, mud, and tidal flats, freshwater ponds and marshes, and even benthic habitats in the deep open channels.

=== Threats ===
Threats to the biodiversity of Coos Bay watershed include invasive species, forest pathogens, and wildfire. Green crabs, a species native to Europe, are invasive in Coos Bay. One of the species of eelgrass, Zostera japonica, is also invasive. Through 2015, seagrass saw an increase in abundance, but Oregon State researchers have suggested that there has been a recent precipitous decline in seagrass mean density in parts of South Slough after a peak in 2015. Additionally, boats and ships have accidentally introduced terrestrial plant species such as gorse, English ivy, reed canary grass, and Spartina spp. The South Slough Research Reserve is aware of these species and, according to its 2017-2022 Management Plan, is "motivated to minimize their damaging effects early." Douglas fir trees may experience swiss needle cast as a result of contracting the fungal infection Nothophaeocryptopus gaeumannii. This results in stunted growth. Port Orford cedars and sometimes Pacific yews contract root rot from Phytophthora lateralis. This rot moves up the tree and kills the inner bark, thereby leading to the death of the tree. Furthermore, wildfire risk continues to increase as global climate change leads to hotter and drier conditions.

== Historical usage ==
=== Native Americans ===
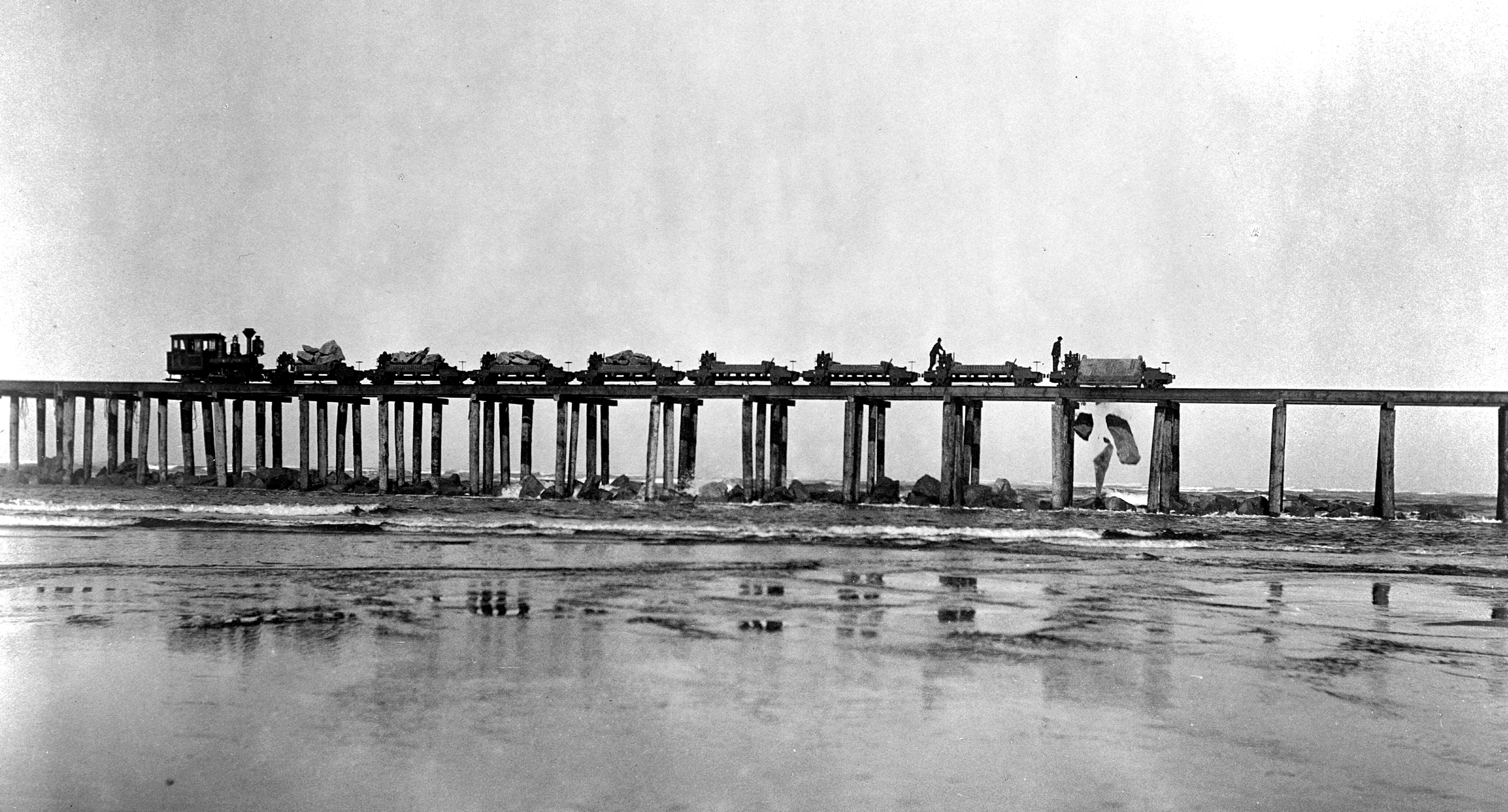
Construction of the Coos Bay Jetty, 1890

The estuary is land of the Coos and the Coquille––specifically the Miluk people––who have lived in the area for approximately 6,000 years. The flora and fauna of the watershed provided significant amounts of food and material for hunting and shelter. Villages generally homed around 100 people. Shortly after European settlers arrived in the 1850s, the Natives were forcibly removed and forbidden to return to their land. In the 1870s, "eligible" Natives were allotted a plot of land on which they could rebuild homes. This program was deeply ingrained within colonization, and therefore promoted assimilation in the Euro-American culture. Today, the Coos peoples are a part of the Confederated Tribes of the Coos, Lower Umpqua, and Siuslaw Indians.

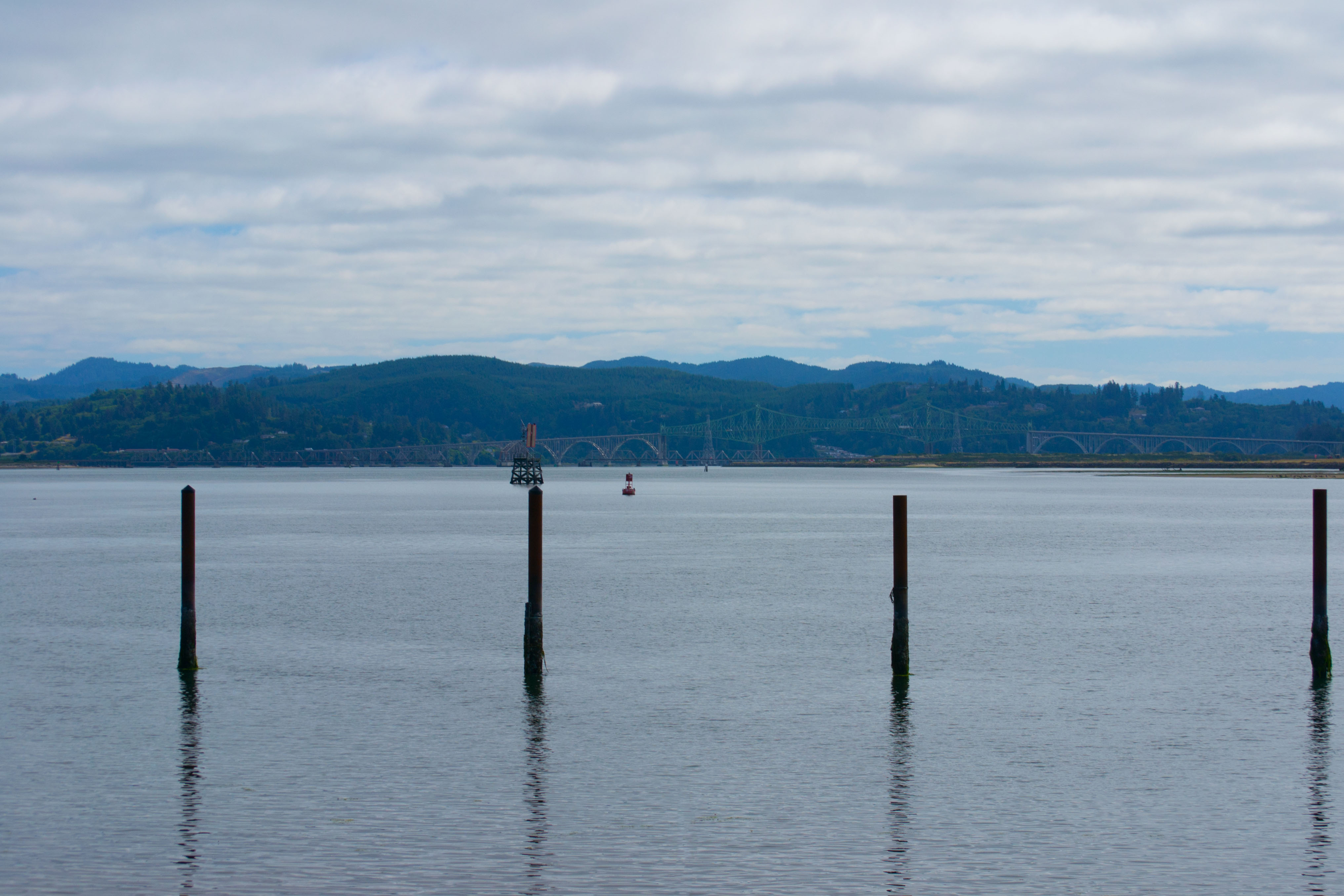
Coos Bay looking east toward the McCullough Memorial Bridge

=== Deep-Draft Navigation Project ===
The estuary has a long history of dredging, deepening, and spoil disposal, dating back to early development in the mid-1800s. In 1976, the Coos Bay was dredged as part of the Deep-Draft Navigation Project, a campaign by the US Army Corps of Engineers to increase channel depth and width for vessel usage. In its natural state, the estuary's entrance was approximately 200 feet wide and 10 feet deep; this project altered the entrance to measure 700 feet wide and 45 feet deep. Total estuary volume has increased 21% while the total estuary areas has decreased by 12%. In contrast, 25 km^{2} of the estuary in South Slough has been managed by the National Estuarine Research Reserve and left unaltered by development. A harbor and bridge were constructed in the entrance of South Slough, and the entry point of Coos River into the estuary has been redirected to the west, partially separating it from the east-estuary flats. As a result of this, modeling reveals, the estuary has overall become more stratified and accumulates more sediment than it did historically. Further deepening of the navigation channel from 11 to 14 m and widening by about 45 m has already been proposed for the western reach. The navigational channel of Coos Estuary is regularly dredged to this day to allow for commercial shipping.

=== Present ===
Currently, the greater Coos County––which encompasses the watershed––is home to over 64,000 people. A 2014 community report ranked the area poorly in climate adaptation, greenhouse gas mitigation, and resource efficiency, along with a few social and community aspects.

== Economy ==
=== Fisheries and aquaculture ===
Coos Bay hosts several oyster aquaculture operations. Clausen's Oysters is located in Haynes Inlet at the north end of the estuary. Qualman Oyster Farms is located near the entrance to South Slough. Additionally, clams are harvested recreationally. Charleston acts as a port for many commercial vessels that fish off of Oregon's coast. Similar to other ports in Oregon, these fisheries include Dungeness crab, Pink shrimp, Pacific whiting, Chinook salmon, Albacore tuna, and Pacific halibut. The prominence of these industries promotes good water quality maintenance.

=== Shipping port ===
The Port of Coos Bay is one of the largest and deepest ports between San Francisco, California and the Columbia River. The majority of cargo is offloaded in the southeast corner of Coos Bay, which is near the head of the inlet, opposite the Coos River entrance. Currently, 2 million tons of cargo move through the port. There are plans to widen the channel from 300 ft to 450 ft and to deepen it from 37 ft to 45 ft, allowing the shipping operations to scale up. Coupled with the Coos Bay Rail Line, which threads through the Oregon Coast Range to Eugene, the port could see increased usage in coming years.

=== Natural gas ===
Jordan Cove, located across the inlet from the airport, was the proposed site of a liquefied natural gas (LNG) terminal by Jordan Cove Energy Project. The terminal would have exported liquefied natural gas from an underground pipeline that would have met with existing pipelines near Malin. The terminal and pipeline projects were cancelled in 2021. Oregon Governor Kulongoski expressed various environmental concerns.
