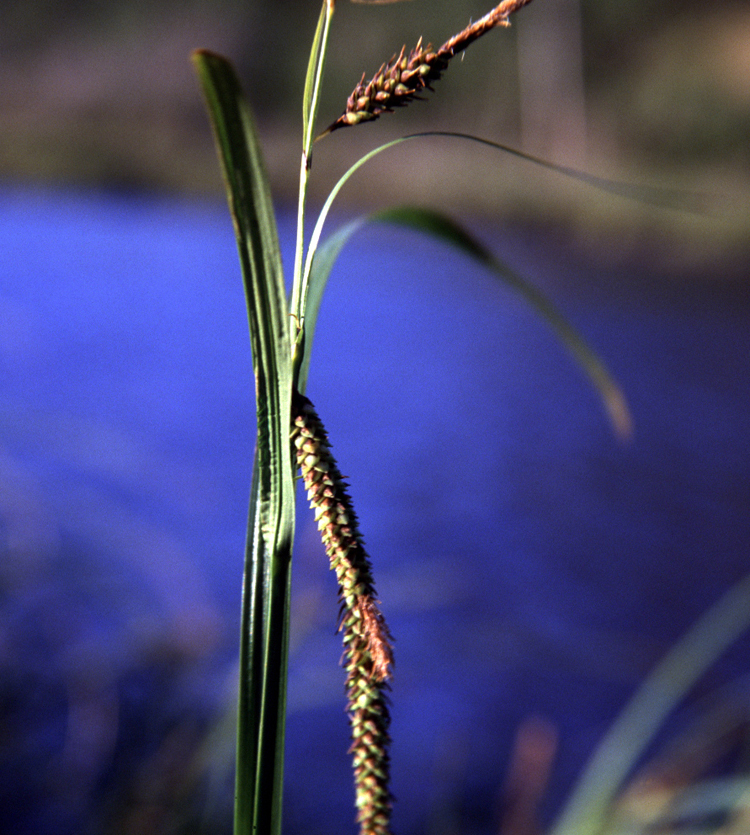

Conservation status
- Least Concern (IUCN 3.1)

Scientific classification
- Kingdom: Plantae
- Clade: Tracheophytes
- Clade: Angiosperms
- Clade: Monocots
- Clade: Commelinids
- Order: Poales
- Family: Cyperaceae
- Genus: Carex
- Species: C. lyngbyei

Binomial name
- Carex lyngbyei Hornem.

Synonyms
- Carex cryptocarpa Carex cryptochlaena

= Carex lyngbyei =

Species of grass-like plant

Carex lyngbyei is a species of sedge known by the common name Lyngbye's sedge. It is native to the west coast of North America from Alaska to California, where it "is the common sedge of the Pacific coastal salt marshes." It is also known from Greenland and Iceland. It prefers to grow in silty sediment rather than sand and in habitat with brackish water, such as salt marshes. This sedge produces stems 25 centimeters to well over one meter tall from a network of long rhizomes. The leaves have reddish brown sheaths which do not have spots. The inflorescence produces stiff, nodding spikes on peduncles. The fruit is coated in a leathery yellowish brown sac called a perigynium. This is a pioneer species, one of the first plants to colonize the mud of tidal flats in its range.
