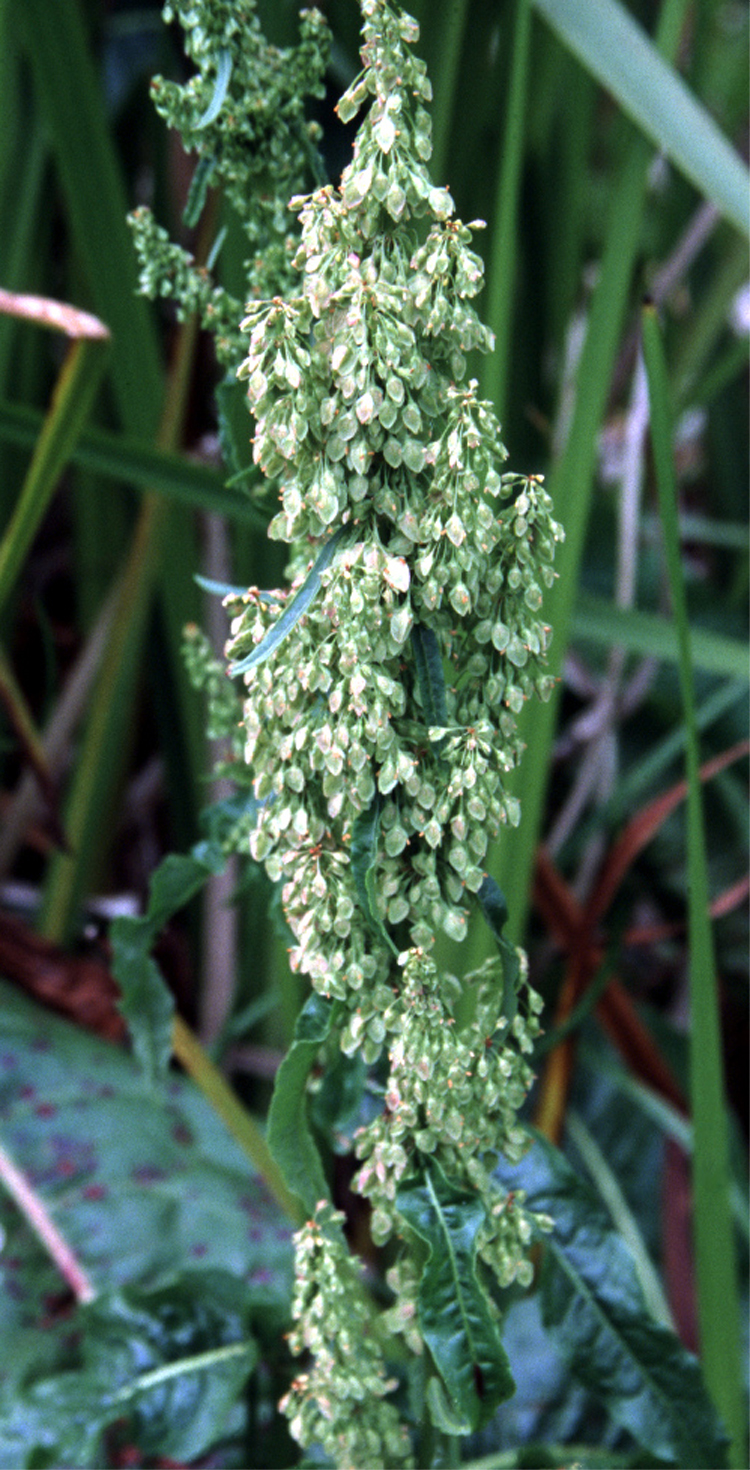

Scientific classification
- Kingdom: Plantae
- Clade: Tracheophytes
- Clade: Angiosperms
- Clade: Eudicots
- Order: Caryophyllales
- Family: Polygonaceae
- Genus: Rumex
- Species: R. occidentalis

Binomial name
- Rumex occidentalis S.Watson

= Rumex occidentalis =

Species of flowering plant

Rumex occidentalis is a flowering plant species belonging to the family Polygonaceae. Commonly known as western dock, Rumex occidentalis can be found in parts of Western North America.

== Description ==
Western dock is considered a perennial plant as a result of its annual flowering and lifetime. Adult plants can reach upwards of 180 cm (6ft). Its leaves are partially persistent at maturity and hold a triangular, blade-like appearance with a truncate base. The stems are typically erect with pedicels no more than 3 times as long as the inner tepals. Its achenes are reddish brown and its flowers grow in whorls of 12-25.

== Distribution ==
Western dock is native to North America and can be found in Western states such as California, Nevada, and Idaho. It has also been found historically in Washington state. It typically flowers during the late spring and summer months. Western docks need moist environments to thrive and are typically found in marshes, bogs, wet meadows, and other shallow water habitats.

== Uses ==
Western dock holds both nutritional and medicinal values. Medicinally, its leaves are used in herbal sweat baths to treat rheumatic pains. The leaves can also be poulticed into a root paste and used to treat open wounds, cuts, and boils. Nutritionally, the leaves, stems, and seeds are all edible. The young leaves of the western dock are cooked and used similarly to spinach. The stems are also cooked but used as rhubarb. The seeds can be consumed raw or cooked and are typically ground into a powder for seasoning or gruel. Consuming western dock in large amounts or uncooked is not advised due to the possibly high oxalic acid levels present in the leaves.
