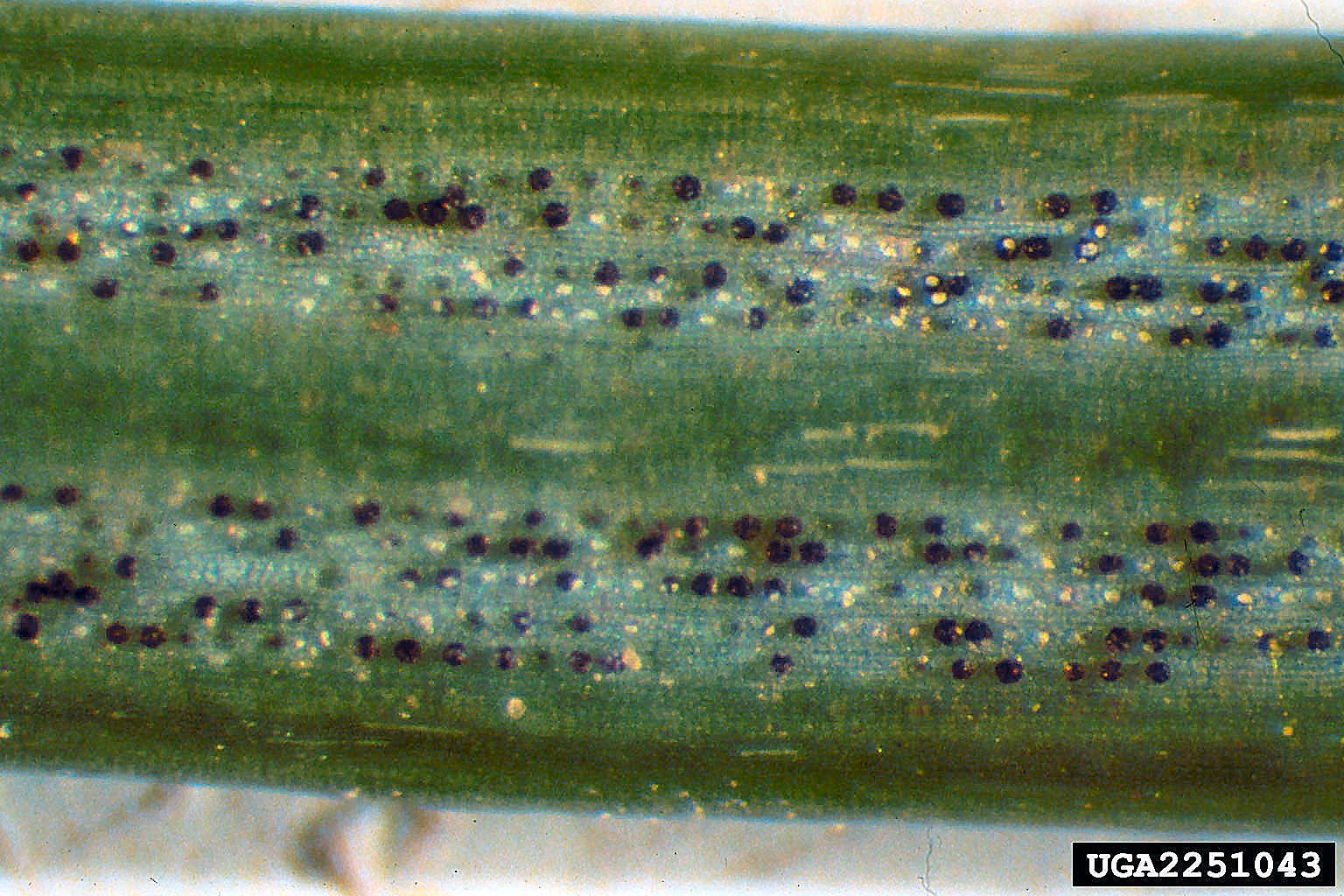
- Fruiting bodies of Nothophaeocryptopus gaeumannii

Scientific classification
- Kingdom: Fungi
- Division: Ascomycota
- Class: Dothideomycetes
- Order: Capnodiales
- Family: Mycosphaerellaceae
- Genus: Nothophaeocryptopus
- Species: N. gaeumannii

Binomial name
- Nothophaeocryptopus gaeumannii (T.Rohde) Videira, C. Nakash., U. Braun & Crous (2017)

Synonyms
- Adelopus gäumanni T.Rohde (1936); Phaeocryptopus gaeumannii Petrak (1938)

= Nothophaeocryptopus gaeumannii =

Species of fungus

Nothophaeocryptopus gaeumannii is a species of fungus that occurs as an endophyte inside the needles of Douglas-fir trees. It is responsible for causing the nonlethal disease known as Swiss needle cast, which results in needle loss and reduction in growth in Douglas-fir.

Traditionally, it has been considered part of family Venturiaceae, but molecular studies have confirmed its placement in Mycosphaerellaceae. Three different lineages of N. gaeumannii are known, each with distinct ecological, morphological, and molecular characteristics.

== Distribution ==
This species of fungus is native to western North America. Remarkably, the disease’s name, Swiss needle cast, arises from the fact that the fungus was first discovered in Switzerland in the 1930s where it was found to be causing disease in plantations of Douglas-fir. It has since been introduced almost everywhere Douglas-fir is grown, and is now widespread in Europe, New Zealand, and Chile. Although the fungus had been known in North America almost since its first discovery, for decades it was not considered to cause disease in its native range, and was largely ignored there until an outbreak occurred in the 1980s and 1990s.

== Ecology ==
Nothophaeocryptopus gaeumannii is an obligate endophyte of Douglas-fir needles. In the spring, ascospores infect young needles, briefly growing epiphytically before the hyphae penetrate the needle tissue via stomata. The fungus then spends most of its life cycle growing intercellularly inside the needle. After maturing for approximately nine months, the fungus produces pseudothecia which emerge from the stomata of the needle, dispersing new spores the following spring.

== Disease ==
Normally, when low in abundance, N. gaeumannii is a relatively benign symbiont of Douglas-fir needles. However, when the fungus is abundant it is responsible for causing the nonlethal disease known as Swiss needle cast. It produces small, spherical black fruiting bodies (pseudothecia) which obstruct the needle’s stomatal openings. The pseudothecia block gas exchange into and out of the needle, which prevents photosynthesis in heavily infected needles. This causes yellowing (chlorosis) of the needles, with eventual necrosis and premature needle-drop. In some heavily infected stands of trees, the only needles remaining are those of the current year, in which the disease has not yet had time to fully develop.

Due to the reduced photosynthesis caused by needle loss, the tree experiences a diminished rate of growth by 52% or more. Increased disease severity tends to occur in climates with mild winters and high humidity where the fungus thrives, and appears to be increasing in severity as a result of climate change.

== Gallery ==
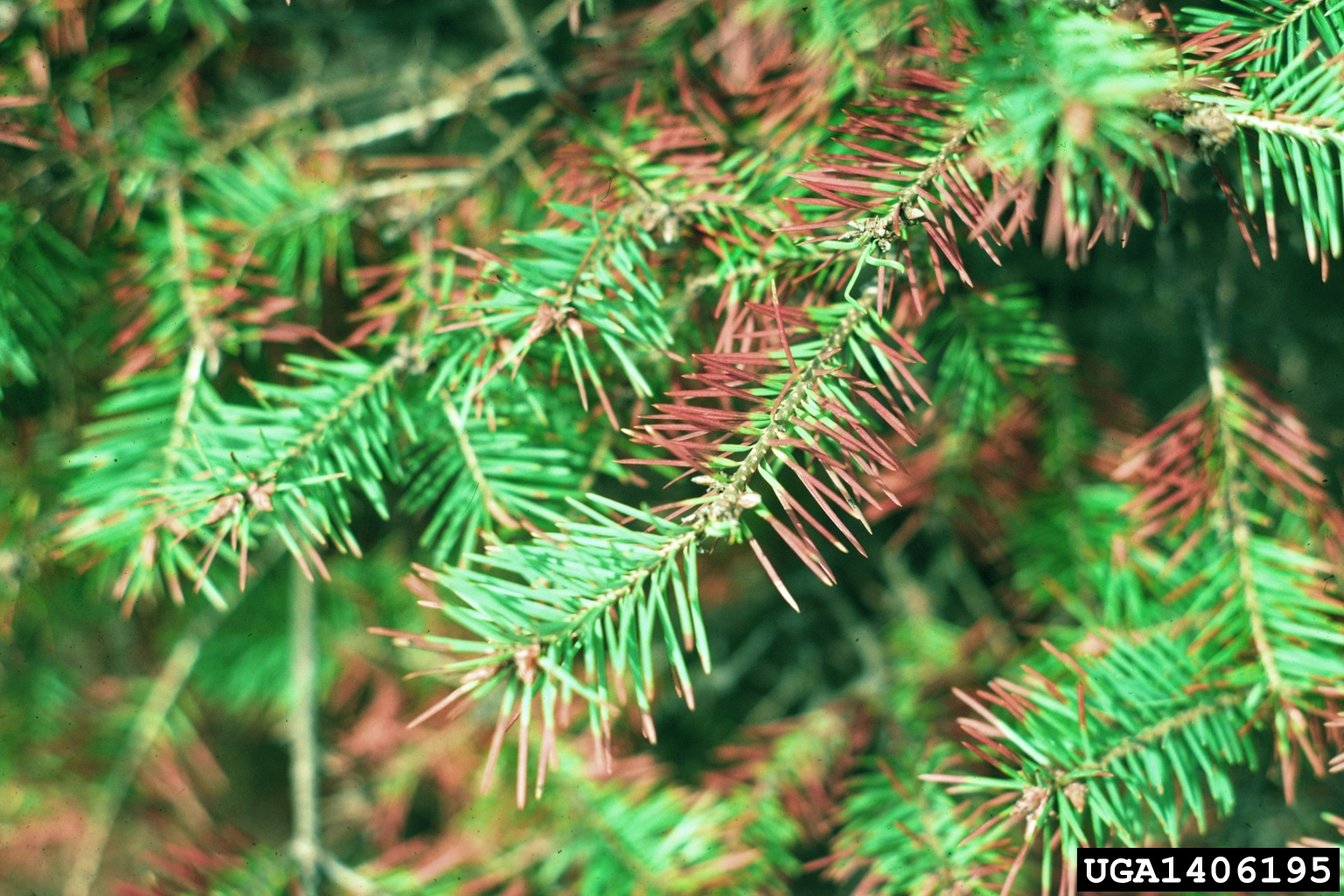
Douglas fir needles showing the effect of Nothophaeocryptopus gaeumannii infection
