= Melville Jacobs =

American anthropologist (1902–1971)

- Born: July 3, 1902; Manhattan, New York, U.S.
- Died: July 31, 1971 (aged 69); Seattle, Washington, U.S.
- Education: Columbia University
- Occupations: Anthropologist, folklorist
- Years active: 1928–1971
- Employer: University of Washington
- Known for: Anthropological and linguistic fieldwork with indigenous peoples of Oregon
- Spouse: Elizabeth Jacobs (married 1931–1971)

Melville Jacobs (July 3, 1902 – July 31, 1971) was an American anthropologist and folklorist known for his work preserving indigenous cultures and languages of the Pacific Northwest. Jacobs was a doctoral student of Franz Boas, a German-American anthropologist and ethnomusicologist who did fieldwork with the Chinookan Peoples. After his time in the field, Jacobs joined the faculty of the University of Washington in 1928 and remained there until his death in 1971. During the McCarthy Era, Jacobs was targeted for his left-wing political activism and his association with the Communist Party USA (CPUSA).

== Education and personal life ==
Jacobs graduated with his bachelor's degree from the City College of New York in 1922. He went on to receive a master's degree in American history from Columbia University in 1923 and a doctorate in anthropology from Columbia in 1931. After studying under Franz Boas at Columbia, Jacobs went on to do linguistic and anthropologic fieldwork with tribes in the state of Oregon. His fieldwork was funded six months at a time by Boas between the years of 1928 and 1936.

During his years of study, Jacobs met Elizabeth Derr and would go on to marry her on the 3rd of January 1931. He mentored her in the field of anthropology and she went on to do her own work with the Tillamook people after accompanying Melville on his research trips in 1933.

Jacobs was a fellow of the American Anthropological Association and an associate editor of the American Anthropologist under Ralph Linton from 1939-1944. He was president of the American Folklore Society from 1963-1964 and served as their delegate to the American Council of Learned Societies from 1966-1968.

Jacobs died of cancer a year short of retirement, several weeks after his 69th birthday on 31 July 1971 in Seattle, Washington.

== Anthropological work ==
During the earlier part of his career and with funding from Franz Boas, Jacobs collected large amounts of linguistic data and text from a wide range of languages of native peoples in Oregon including Sahaptin, Molale, Kalapuya, Clackamas, Hanis, Miluk, Tillamook, Alsea, Upper Umpqua, Galice and Chinook Jargon. One method of collection was by working with indigenous story tellers such as Victoria Howard, born on the Grand Ronde reservation, and audio recording and transcribing their songs and stories.

Jacobs met with a number of last speakers of indigenous languages and worked extensively to preserve as much of these dying languages as possible for future study. Jacobs recorded audio on wax cylinders, in the earlier years, and on acetate records using a custom-built portable phonograph recorder which he took into the field. After completing his fieldwork in 1939, the latter part of Jacobs' career was spent transcribing and translating his recordings and research notes.

== Activism and controversy ==
Following in the footsteps of Franz Boas, Jacobs was a strong opponent of scientific racism. Up until 1948, he and a number of his fellow anthropologists at the University of Washington gave lectures around the Pacific North West opposing racism and racial science, which was at the time still considered part of the field of anthropology. These activities in particular are what drew the FBI's attention to Jacobs in the early years of the Cold War.

Jacobs had been a member of the CPUSA from 1935 to 1945 and was involved in a variety of progressive activities. He, as well as Franz Boas, sat on board of the American Committee for the Protection of Foreign Born in the early 1940s. He was also engaged in effort to block the Hobbs "Concentration Camp" Bill of 1941. When approached by the Washington State Committee on un-American Activities and asked to give the names of other University of Washington faculty who were present at Communist Party meetings, he refused to do so and stated unequivocally that the people in question had broken no laws and were loyal Americans as well as his friends. Jacobs' wife Elizabeth was a Party member and was known to the FBI for some time before these events took place. Ultimately, Jacobs would never lose his job at the University of Washington and, after surviving a two year probationary period from 1949 to 1951, he remained at the university until his death in 1971.

Efforts to publish an edited collection of anthropology articles with Bernhard Stern, a Marxist social anthropologist from Columbia University, were frustrated by political troubles and possible interference from more conservative contemporaries in the anthropology community. In the next three years, Stern would be brought before the Senate Subcommittee on Internal Security and the Committee on Government Operations due to his involvement with the CPUSA and other groups deemed threatening to national security. The pair would never find a publisher for their book as a result of these setbacks.

== Legacy ==
After his death, Elizabeth Jacobs established the Jacobs Research Fund to support anthropological research in the Pacific Northwest. The couple's papers, including extensive raw linguistic material that has provided the basis for subsequent research on now extinct languages, are held by the University of Washington in special collections and are available to view upon request.

In 2019, the "Melville Jacobs Collection of Native Americans of the American Northwest (1929-1939)" was selected by the Library of Congress for preservation in the National Recording Registry as "culturally, historically, or aesthetically significant".

== Published works ==
- Northwest Sahaptin Texts I (1929)
- A Sketch of Northern Sahaptin Grammar (1931)
- Notes on the Structure of Chinook Jargon (1932)
- Northwest Sahaptin Texts, II (1934)
- Texts in Chinook Jargon (1936)
- Northwest Sahaptin Texts, III (1937)
- Coos Narrative and Ethnologic Texts (1939)
- Coos Myth Texts (1940)
- Historic Perspectives in Indian Languages of Oregon and Washington (1941)
- Kalapuya Texts (1945)
- Outline of Anthropology (1947)
- General Anthropology; A Brief Survey of Physical, Cultural, and Social Anthropology (1952)
- Clackamas Chinook Texts I (1958)
- Clackamas Chinook Texts II (1959)
- The content and style of an oral literature: Clackamas Chinook myths and tales (1959)
- The Content and Style of an Oral Literature (1959)
- The People are Coming Soon; Analyses of Clackamas Chinook Myths and Tales (1960)
- Pattern in Cultural Anthropology (1964)
- The Anthropologist Looks at Myth (1966)
