= Coos people =

Indigenous people living in Oregon, US

Coos
Total population
- 526 (1990s)

Regions with significant populations
- United States(Oregon)

Languages
- English, formerly Coosan (Hanis and Miluk)

Religion
- traditional tribal religion, formerly Ghost Dance

Related ethnic groups
- Siuslaw people

Coos people are an indigenous people of the Northwest Plateau, living in Oregon. They live on the southwest Oregon Pacific coast. Today, Coos people are enrolled in the following federally recognized tribes:

- Confederated Tribes of the Coos, Lower Umpqua and Siuslaw Indians of Oregon
- Confederated Tribes of Siletz Indians of Oregon
- Coquille Indian Tribe.

== Language ==
The Coosan language family consists of two languages: Hanis (also known as Coos) and Miluk. Both are extinct. The Confederated Tribes of Coos, Lower Umpqua and Siuslaw has a language program to revitalize them.

== History ==
Their neighbors were Siuslauan, Kalapuyan, and the Umpqua Indians. The total population of Hanis and Miluk Coos in 1780 has been estimated to be around 2,000.

On February 8, 1806, the Coos people were first mentioned by Euro-Americans. William Clark, wintering at Fort Clatsop near the Columbia with Meriwether Lewis and the Corp of Discovery, reported the existence of the "Cook-koo-oose nation". His journal entry stated: "I saw several prisoners from this nation with the Clatsops and Kilamox, they are much fairer than the common Indians of this quarter, and do not flatten their heads."

The Coos joined with the Umpqua and Siuslaw tribes and became a confederation with the signing of a Treaty in August 1855. In 1857, the U.S. Government removed the Coos Indians to Port Umpqua. Four years later, they were again transferred to the Alsea Sub-agency at Yachats Reservation where they remained until 1876. In 1876, the sub-agency was handed over to white settlement and the Indians were assigned to relocate to the Siletz Reservation, which created a major disruption among the tribal members. By 1937, their population had dwindled to 55.

In 1972, Hanis and Miluk Coos, along with members of the Kuitsh and Siuslaw tribes, incorporated as the Coos Tribe of Indians. In subsequent years, they began providing food assistance for low-income families and established job placement and drug and alcohol abuse programs.

== Culture ==
There were 40–50 villages in the Coos tribes (they lived around the Coos bay and North Bend area). Most of them were hunters, fishermen, and gatherers. For entertainment, they held foot races, canoe races, dice (bone or stick) games, target practice, and also shinny (field hockey).

== Namesakes ==
Several Oregon landmarks are named after the tribe, including Coos Bay, the city of Coos Bay, Oregon, and Coos County.

== Notable Coos people ==
- Annie Miner Peterson (1860–1939), last speaker of the Miluk language

== See also ==
- Coosan languages
