= West Fork Millicoma River =

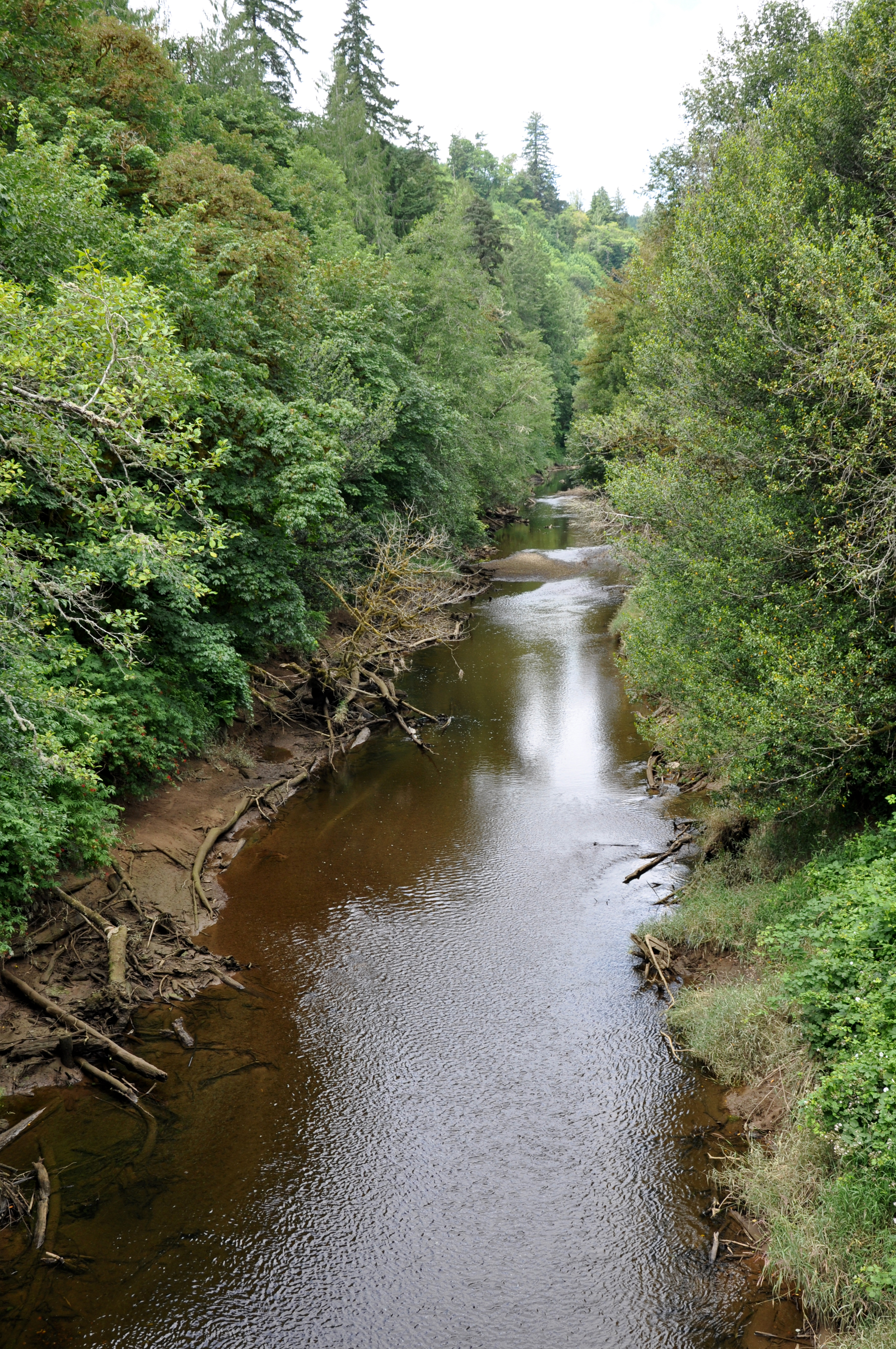
- View from the Oregon Route 241 bridge at Allegany

- Location of the mouth of the West Fork Millicoma River in Oregon
- Etymology: Possibly the Coos people's name for the river

Location
- Country: United States
- State: Oregon
- County: Coos

Physical characteristics
- Source: near Elk Peak
  - location: northeastern Coos County, Southern Oregon Coast Range
  - coordinates: 43°33′08″N 123°53′17″W
  - elevation: 1,519 ft (463 m)
- Mouth: Millicoma River
  - location: Allegany
  - coordinates: 43°25′27″N 124°01′48″W
  - elevation: 23 ft (7.0 m)
- Length: 34 mi (55 km)
- Discharge
  - minimum: 1 cu ft/s (0.028 m^{3}/s)

The West Fork Millicoma River is a tributary, about 34 miles (55 km) long, of the Millicoma River in the U.S. state of Oregon. Rising in northeastern Coos County near the Douglas County line, it flows generally southwest through the Elliott State Forest of the Southern Oregon Coast Range to the community of Allegany. There it joins the East Fork Millicoma River to form the Millicoma. In turn, the Millicoma, which is only about 9 miles (14 km) long, joins the South Fork Coos River to form the Coos River. The Coos River, itself only about 5 miles (8 km) long, empties into the eastern end of Coos Bay, which connects to the Pacific Ocean.

== Course ==
Beginning northeast of Elk Peak, the river flows generally north parallel to Umpcoos Ridge before turning west and receiving Cougar Creek from the right and then Kelly Creek from the right about 32 miles (51 km) from the mouth. Over the next 6 miles (9.7 km), Panther Creek enters from the left, Fish Creek from the right, Elk Creek from the left, and Knife, Deer, and Otter creeks from the right. The river turns south, and Joes Creek enters from the right at about river mile (RM) 24.5 or river kilometer (RK) 39.4. About 1.5 miles (2.4 km) further downstream, Buck Creek enters from the right. The next named tributary to enter the river is Trout Creek, which comes in from the right at about RM 19 (RK 31).

About 17 miles (27 km) from the mouth, the river turns west and a mile later descends Stulls Falls and turns south once more. Turning west near RM 14 (RK 23), the river goes over Henrys Falls, meandering generally south-southwest thereafter. Schumacher Creek enters from the right before the river passes over Pidgeon Falls and receives Totten and Daggett creeks from the right about 7 miles (11 km) from the mouth. The river then flows by a stream gauge maintained by the Coos Watershed Association. Turning south once again, the river flows around Devils Elbow and receives Rainy Creek from the left before meeting the East Fork Millicoma River at Allegany. The West Fork Millicoma Road runs roughly parallel to the river from Allegany to Stalls Falls, and logging roads reach the headwaters.

== Recreation ==
The river supports a steelhead fishery as well as good coastal cutthroat trout fishing near the headwaters. A hatchery about 9 miles (14 km) upstream of Allegany releases juvenile steelhead to the lower river, but it is difficult to fish downstream of the hatchery because of limited bank access and the dangers of boating through rapids. However, the hatchery site itself offers bank access. The site also includes an interpretive center that is open to the public.

Whitewater enthusiasts sometimes run a stretch of the river, about 6 to 9 miles (10 to 14 km) long, that begins upstream of Henry's Falls. Obstacles like the falls, a 10-foot (3.0 m) drop, are generally scouted before running and often portaged.

== See also ==
- List of rivers of Oregon

== Works cited ==
- Giordano, Pete (2004). Soggy Sneakers: A Paddler's Guide to Oregon's Rivers, 4th ed. Seattle: The Mountaineers Books. ISBN 978-0-89886-815-9.
- McArthur, Lewis A., and McArthur, Lewis L. (2003) [1928]. Oregon Geographic Names, 7th ed. Portland: Oregon Historical Society Press. ISBN 0-87595-277-1.
- Sheehan, Madelynne Diness (2005). Fishing in Oregon: The Complete Oregon Fishing Guide, 10th ed. Scappoose, Oregon: Flying Pencil Publications. ISBN 0-916473-15-5.
