= East Fork Millicoma River =

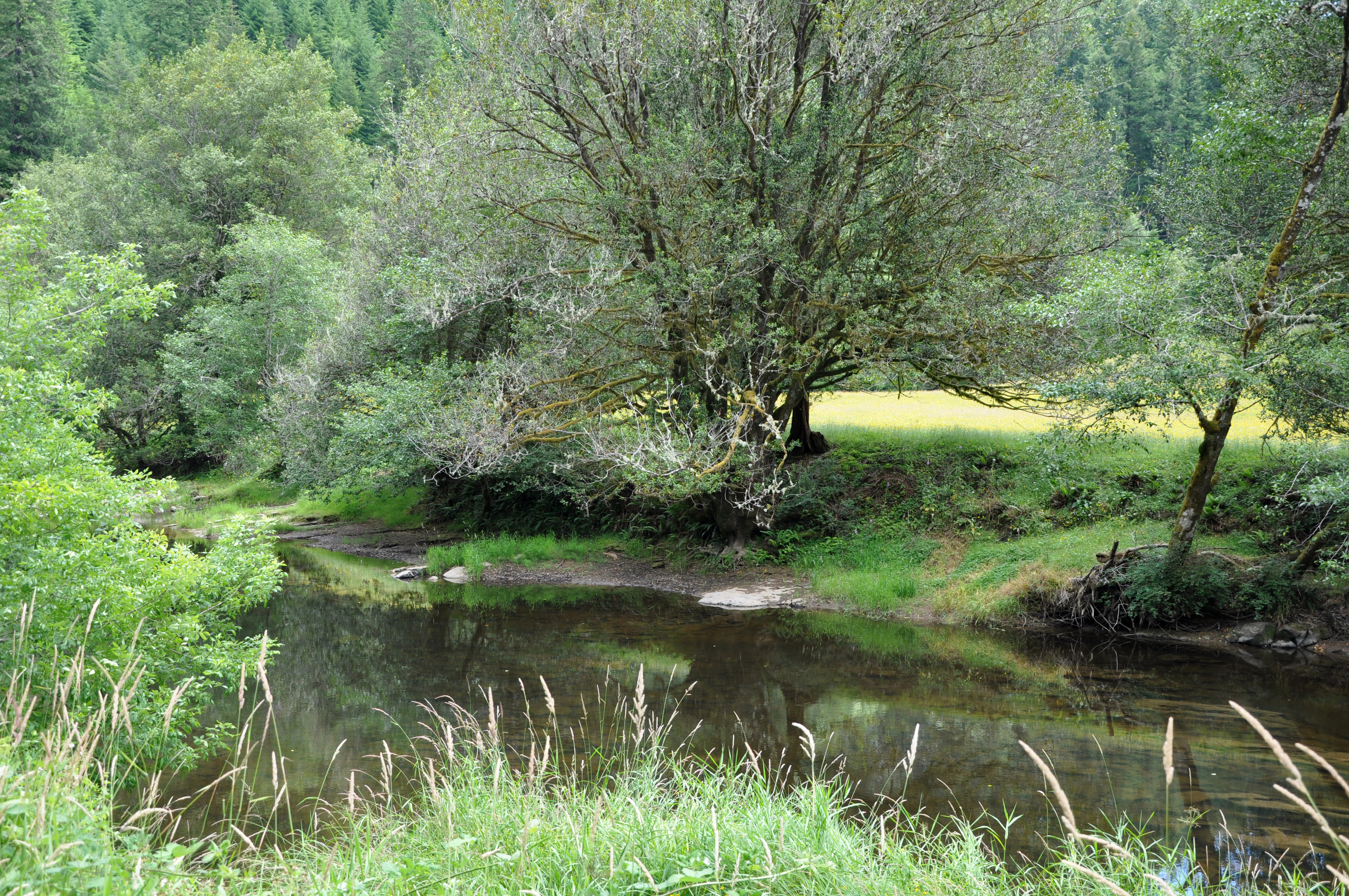
- Downstream of Nesika County Park

- Location of the mouth of the East Fork Millicoma River in Oregon
- Etymology: Possibly the Coos people's name for the river

Location
- Country: United States
- State: Oregon
- County: Coos

Physical characteristics
- Source: eastern Coos County
  - location: near Douglas County line, Southern Oregon Coast Range
  - coordinates: 43°24′50″N 123°46′04″W
  - elevation: 1,921 ft (586 m)
- Mouth: Millicoma River
  - location: Allegany
  - coordinates: 43°25′27″N 124°01′49″W
  - elevation: 20 ft (6.1 m)
- Length: 24 mi (39 km)
- Discharge
  - minimum: 1 cu ft/s (0.028 m^{3}/s)

The East Fork Millicoma River is a tributary, about 24 miles (39 km) long, of the Millicoma River in the U.S. state of Oregon. Rising in eastern Coos County, it flows generally west to the community of Allegany, where it joins the West Fork Millicoma River to form the Millicoma. In turn, the Millicoma, which is only about 9 miles (14 km) long, joins the South Fork Coos River to form the Coos River. The Coos River, itself only about 5 miles (8 km) long, empties into the eastern end of Coos Bay, which connects to the Pacific Ocean.

Forming north of Coos Ridge in the Southern Oregon Coast Range near Ivers Peak, the river flows west, receiving Beulah Creek from the right about 18 miles (29 km) from the mouth. About 6 miles (9.7 km) further downstream, Little Matson Creek enters from the right, and a mile or so later Fox Creek enters from the left. The river receives Glenn Creek from the right about 7 miles (11 km) from the mouth. Glenn Creek and one of its tributaries, Silver Creek, cascade over Golden and Silver falls in the Golden and Silver Falls State Natural Area. The East Fork Millicoma River then passes a stream gauge managed by the Coos Watershed Association.

Rodine Creek enters from the left about 2 miles (3 km) later. Just below the confluence with Rodine Creek, Nesika County Park is on the left, and Hodges Creek enters from the left. Less than a mile from Allegany, Marlow Creek enters from the right and then Nowlit Creek, also from the right, before the East Fork meets the West Fork to form the Millicoma. East Fork Millicoma Road runs parallel to the river for much of its course.

The river supports coastal cutthroat trout and a run of winter steelhead. Nesika County Park, about 2.5 miles (4.0 km) east of Allegany on East Fork Millicoma Road, offers bank access for steelhead fishing.

== See also ==
- List of rivers of Oregon

== Works cited ==
- McArthur, Lewis A., and McArthur, Lewis L. (2003) [1928]. Oregon Geographic Names, 7th ed. Portland: Oregon Historical Society Press. ISBN 0-87595-277-1.
- Sheehan, Madelynne Diness (2005). Fishing in Oregon: The Complete Oregon Fishing Guide, 10th ed. Scappoose, Oregon: Flying Pencil Publications. ISBN 0-916473-15-5.
