= Lifeline =

Lifeline or Lifelines may refer to:

== Support, care, and emergency services ==
- Crisis hotline
  - Lifeline (crisis support service), Australia-based, now international
  - National Suicide Prevention Lifeline, US
- LifeLine (medical transport), a medical transport service associated with Indiana University Health system
- Lifeline of Ohio, organ procurement organization
- Lifeline project, a substance use disorder charity in Manchester
- Lifeline (safety), a fall protection safety device in the form of an open wire rope fence
- Life Line Screening, a health screening company in the US
- Lifeline utility, in New Zealand, an essential service during major emergencies
- Lifeline (FCC program), an FCC program for communications services for low-income consumers

== Film ==
- The Life Line, a 1919 American silent drama
- Life Line, a 1935 Hong Kong film
- Lifeline (1997 film), a Hong Kong film by Johnny To
- Lifeline (2024 film), an Indian Marathi-language drama
- Lifeline (2025 film), an American film directed by Feras Alfuqaha
- Lifeline (2026 film), a Canadian film directed by Ilhan Abdullahi

== Music ==
=== Albums ===
- Life Line (album), by the George Adams-Don Pullen Quartet, 1981
- Lifeline (The Answering Machine album) or the title song, 2011
- Lifeline (Ben Harper album) or the title song, 2007
- Lifeline (Iris DeMent album), 2004
- Lifeline (Neal Morse album) or the title song, 2008
- Lifeline (Pablo Cruise album) or the title song, 1976
- Lifeline (Phillips, Craig and Dean album), 1994
- Lifeline (Roy Ayers album) or the title song, 1977
- Lifeline (EP), by Jesu, or the title song, 2007
- Lifeline, by RJ Thompson, 2020
- Lifelines (A-ha album) or the title song (see below), 2002
- Lifelines (Andrea Corr album), 2011
- Lifelines (Arild Andersen album) or the title song, 1981
- Lifelines (I Prevail album) or the title song, 2016
- Lifelines, a Peter, Paul and Mary album, 1995
- Lifelines: The Jimi Hendrix Story, 1990

=== Songs ===
- "Lifeline" (Brooke Fraser song), 2003
- "Lifeline" (Jamiroquai song), 2011
- "Lifeline" (Papa Roach song), 2009
- "Lifeline" (Spandau Ballet song), 1982
- "Lifelines" (song), by A-ha, 2002
- "Life Line", by 10cc from Bloody Tourists, 1978
- "Life Line", by Harry Nilsson from The Point!, 1970
- "Lifeline", by Anastacia from Resurrection, 2014
- "Lifeline", by Angels & Airwaves from I-Empire, 2007
- "Lifeline", by CeCe Peniston from Finally, 1992
- "Lifeline", by Imogen Heap from Sparks, 2014
- "Lifeline", by Justin Jesso which represented Illinois in the American Song Contest
- "Lifeline", by LeRoux, 1983
- "Lifelines", by Rodney Atkins from Take a Back Road, 2011

== Television ==
- Lifeline (1978 TV series), a 1978–79 American documentary series
- Lifeline (2017 TV series), an American science fiction drama series
- Lifeline (Spanish TV series) (Pulsaciones), a 2017 thriller series
- Lifelines (TV series), a 1993–1996 Irish chat show
- "Life Line" (Star Trek Voyager), a 2000 episode
- "Lifeline" (The L Word), a 2006 episode
- "Lifeline" (Stargate Atlantis), a 2007 episode
- "Lifelines" (Casualty), a 1987 episode
- Lifeline, a help for answering a question in the game show Who Wants to Be a Millionaire?
- Lifeline, a Belgian WWII resistance group in the 1977 TV series Secret Army

== Video games ==
- Lifeline (video game), a 2003 action-adventure game
- Lifeline (2015 video game), a text-based adventure mobile game
- "Lifeline", a 2014 DLC for the video game State of Decay
- Lifeline, a playable character in the game Apex Legends

== Other arts and entertainment ==
- The Lifeline, a 1946 novel by Phyllis Bottome
- Lifeline (G.I. Joe), a fictional character in the G.I. Joe universe
- Lifeline Theatre, Chicago, Illinois, US
- "Life-Line", a science fiction short story by Robert A. Heinlein
- The Life Line (painting), an 1884 painting by Winslow Homer
- Lifelines (literary journal), literary journal of Dartmouth College
- Lifeline (musical), an off-Broadway musical about antibiotic resistance

== Religious and humanitarian missions ==
- Life-Line (mission boat), a Baptist missionary boat in Coos Bay, Oregon, US, 1914–23
- Lifeline (ship), formerly FRV Clupea, a UK small rescue boat and former fisheries research vessel
- Lifeline Expedition, a Christian initiative for reconciliation from the Atlantic slave trade
- Lifeline 3, from Britain to the Gaza Strip in 2006
- Lifeline Energy formerly Freeplay Foundation, a London-based NGO active in Africa
- Lifeline Malawi, a Calgary-based charity
- Lifeline Center for Child Development, a child psychiatry center in Queens, New York, US

== Other uses ==
- Lifeline program, a telephone financial-assistance program in the US
- Kernmantle rope used for safety in rock climbing
- In sailing, ropes or netting around the edge of the sailboat to prevent people from falling off the boat
- Fall arrest, a form of fall protection to prevent falling
- In palmistry, a particular crease in the palm
- LifeLines, genealogy freeware
- Lifeline (diving), or tether, a line from the diver to a tender at the surface

== See also ==
- British Imperial Lifeline, aka All-Red Route, steamship route from Britain to India via the Suez Canal
- Chai Lifeline New York illness charity
- Lifeline Express, rail-based mobile hospital
- Operation Lifeline Sudan, consortium of UN agencies
- Southern Evacuation Lifeline, proposed freeway in South Carolina, US
