= Liberty (sternwheeler) =

- Liberty somewhere on the Coquille River or on a waterway connected to Coos Bay.

History
- Name: Liberty
- Port of registry: Coos Bay, Oregon
- Builder: Carl Herman, at Bandon, Oregon
- In service: 1903
- Out of service: 1918
- Identification: U.S. 200083

General characteristics
- Type: Inland passenger/freight
- Tonnage: 174 gross tons; 120 registered tons
- Length: 90.7 ft (27.65 m)
- Beam: 20.8 ft (6.34 m)
- Depth of hold: 4.6 ft (1.40 m)
- Decks: two
- Installed power: Twin steam engines, horizontally mounted.
- Propulsion: Sternwheel

Liberty was a sternwheel steamboat that was operated on the Coquille River and then on Coos Bay from 1903 to 1918. Liberty was notable for having its ownership entangled in various legal claims in the early 1910s, including some involving a colorful North Bend, Oregon business promoter Lorenzo Dow "Major" Kinney (1855-1920).

== Construction and initial inspection ==
Liberty was built in 1903 at Bandon, Oregon by Carl Herman. Liberty was 90.7 ft (27.65 m) long, with a beam of 20.8 ft (6.34 m) and depth of hold of 4.6 ft (1.40 m). The steamer measured out at 176 gross and 120 net tons. The required number of crew members was shown as four. The official U.S. steamboat registry number was 200083.

It was reported that on September 12, 1903, the U.S. steamboat inspectors Edwards and Fuller departed Portland, Oregon to inspect the steamers Dispatch and Liberty at Coquille City. However, the official report of the inspection service states that Liberty's first inspection was earlier, on August 25, 1903.

== Operations on the Coquille river ==
Liberty's operations on the Coquille river included a variety of passenger and freight transport. On September 4, 1904, the steamers Liberty, Dispatch, and Favorite offered to deliver baled grass and clover hay to Bandon or Coquille City at a price of $11 per ton. On July 29, 1905, Liberty was scheduled to carry an excursion party from Coquille City to Bandon. On Sunday July 7, 1907, Liberty transported an excursion from Coquille City to Bandon of persons who had come to Coquille City by train to watch the Coos Bay area baseball teams play teams in the Coquille area.

Liberty also filled in for other steamers. On August 24, 1905, the steamer Favorite was off its route for several days, and Liberty took Favorite's place.

== Sinking and other hazards ==
Liberty sunk, at Bandon, Oregon, 1907

On April 19, 1907, when Liberty was tied up to a dock at Bandon, a water line had been run on to the boat to fill up the boat's water supply to generate steam for the boiler. Someone left the water line running overnight, which swamped and sank the Liberty. The boat remained on the bottom until April 23, when the Bandon life-saving crew was able to use barges to raise the vessel's deck above the surface of the water. The hull was then pumped out, repairs were effected, and the steamer was able to return to service. Liberty was back in running condition no later than July 7, 1907.

Fire was a serious danger to wooden ships like Liberty, particularly steamers due to their use of fireboxes and boilers. On August 15, 1906, a fire at Parkersburgh destroyed the sawmill and almost all of the buildings in the town. The schooner Oregon, tied at the dock and loading cargo, was damaged by the fire. Oregon would have been completely destroyed, but Liberty came along and towed the schooner away from the fire. On July 29, 1907, Liberty under the command of Captain Moomaw, held a fire drill which was praised in the press for its realism.

Liberty was fueled by slab wood, and the loading of the fuel could be dangerous. On August 7, 1908, it was reported that the previous Monday, Liberty's captain, H.W. Dunham, sustained serious injury to his foot when the steamer was loading slab wood at Prosper. A large piece of wood came down end-ways from the high dock, striking Dunham's foot and fracturing the bones in some of his toes.

== Merger of boat lines ==
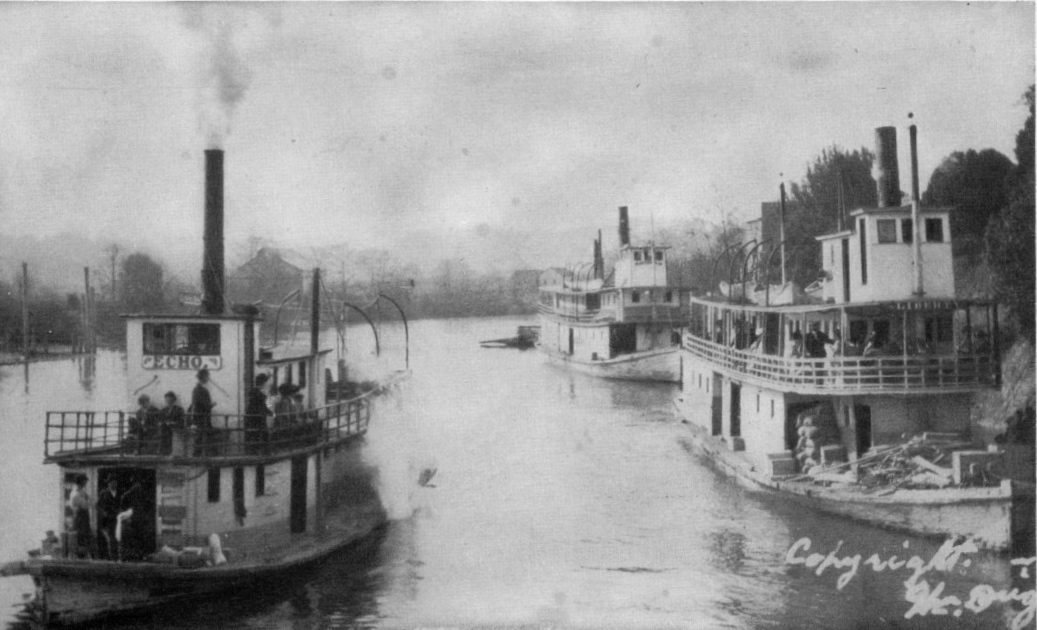
Liberty at Coquille, far right. Steamer Echo is on left, with Dispatch in center.

On October 30, 1908, it was reported that the Coquille River Transportation Company was considering bringing Liberty to Coos Bay and put it on the Coos River run. The decision depended on whether a proposed merger of the lines, went through, and if it did not, Liberty, might be transferred to the bay.

On November 5, 1908, Captain C.E. Edwards, who was in charge of the steamers Alert and Alma, announced that there would be a merger, effective December 1, 1908, of the craft operating on the Coos River and the various inlets around Coos Bay. A new corporation would be formed to take ownership of the boats. Although precisely which boats would be acquired by the corporation had not yet been determined, those controlled by Captain Rogers, the boats of Captain Edwards, and the steamer Liberty would be included.

A scheduled had not been set, but Captain Edwards stated that Marshfield and North Bend would be the terminals of all the lines, and that the schedules would be spread out more, rather than bunching up together to complete for business at the same time and place.

Stock from the new corporation was to be issued in a value equal to the boats and the business brought into the corporation. Managers of the Coquille Transportation Company, Stratton and C.J. McLean would come to Coos Bay and participate the management of the new company.

== Transfer to Coos Bay ==
Following the merger, Liberty was brought to Coos Bay. The vessel underwent an overhaul at North Bend, which was complete by January 18, 1909, when Liberty was brought north from the Coquille River to Marshfield. It was thought that Liberty would soon be placed on a regular run, probably from Marshfield to Allegany on the north fork of the Coos River, in conjunction with the Alert.

On May 5, 1909, it was reported that Liberty had been placed in service towing logs, and was to overhauled in preparation for being placed into passenger service. As of July 19, 1909, Liberty was still towing logs, taking a large tow that day to the C.A. Smith mill. By August 20, 1909, Liberty was able to carry passengers, having been designed that day to carry a party of excursionists. And by November 14, 1909, Liberty was carrying parties for events such as funerals.

== Sale to Coos Bay Rapid Transit Company ==
On April 25, 1910, the owners of Liberty, McLain, Stratton, and Smith, announced that they had sold the steamer to H.P. Campbell of the Coos Bay Rapid Transit Company for a price of $10,000. At about that time the Coos Bay Rapid Transit Company, whose principal promoter was Lorenzo Dow Kinney (1855-1920), was soliciting bids for the construction of a street railway from its dock in North Bend to Marshfield.

Kinney, who sometimes was referred to as "Major" Kinney, was a North Bay businessman who engaged in a variety of dubious schemes. Eventually Kinney's rapid transit plans amounted only to "a horse-drawn wagon with a nickel fare and a boat on the bay."

McLain, one of the three men who sold Liberty to the Coos Bay Rapid Transit Company, later sued Kinney over the sale. McLain alleged that Kinney had issued him worthless "pool certificates" for the boat's value. On January 27, 1913, Captain McLain arrived in Coos County from the Columbia River to give testimony in the trial

The case was tried before Coos County Circuit Court Judge John S. Coke (b.1867). The plaintiffs won, and were awarded a judgment of $20,000 against Kinney. In 1914, the case was argued before the Oregon Supreme Court by lawyer Charles A. Sehlbrede (1852-1922). The verdict for the plaintiff was reversed by the Oregon Supreme Court, which found that the evidence produced at trial was insufficient to support the plaintiff's formal allegations.

== Lawsuits and claims ==
In addition to the Kinney matter, Liberty became subject to a lot of claims and litigation. In September, 1910 a lawsuit against Liberty filed by M.H. Prendergast was scheduled to be heard before the Coos County Circuit Court. In October, 1910, it was reported that Liberty was to be sold by the Sheriff to satisfy the claims of various creditors, but there was a delay in the sale so that the sheriff could evaluate the legal priority of the claims. J.C. Gray held a mortgage on the steamer but there were also competing labor claims, apparently for unpaid wages. It was the notice given by J.C. Gray of his mortgage that caused the sheriff to delay the sale. Eventually Liberty was bought at a sheriff's sale by the Smith-Powers Logging Company and converted into a tug.

== Conversion to tow boat ==
To prepare Liberty for conversion to a tow boat, the new owners, Smith-Powers Logging Company removed the boiler so that newer boilers could be installed. The old boilers from Liberty were installed into the sternwheeler Alert.

Following reconstruction, on September 21, 1911, steamboat inspectors Edwards and Fuller arrived in Coos Bay from Portland to examine Liberty. The reconstruction involved the installation of new and more powerful engines and the removal of the cabin from the boat. On October 13, 1911, it was reported that both Liberty and the steamer Maple, on the Coquille River, both passed an inspection carried out by steamboat inspectors Fuller and Ames.

== Later years ==
In 1915, Liberty was reported to be the same length and beam as originally built, and still in passenger service, but to be somewhat reduced in size, to 140 gross and 85 net tons.

In January 1916, thieves stole about $1,000 in brass and other metal parts and tools from the Liberty, the sternwheel steamer Powers, and the gasoline launch Pacific. The parts and tools were sold to foundries. The extensive nature of the work needed to steal the machinery, as well as the heavy weight of some of the items taken, indicated a long term planned effort by a number of conspirators.

== Disposition and historical issue ==
The last disposition of Liberty is unclear. There may have been a transfer to Pprtland. In 1917, it was reported that a vessel named Liberty had been acquired by Hosford towing concern of the Columbia River, and was under repair In Portland.

One historian reports that Liberty was transferred to the San Francisco Bay, and thereafter abandoned, in 1920, on a mudflat near Oakland, California. Available evidence indicates that this was incorrect. There was an earlier vessel named Liberty (U.S. registry number 141917) built at Bandon, in 1889, and operating in San Francisco Bay as of 1918. At 60 gross and 30 net tons, this propeller-driven vessel was much smaller than the 1903 Bandon-built sternwheeler Liberty. Unlike the 1889 propeller Liberty, the 1903 sternwheeler Liberty (U.S. registry number 200083) does not appear in the 1918 annual merchant list.

Another historian lists Liberty as being out of service in 1918, with no further details. End of service in 1918 is consistent with Liberty's not being shown on the 1918 list of merchant vessels.

== See also ==
- Steamboats of the Coquille River
- Coos Bay Mosquito Fleet
