= Coos Bay Mosquito Fleet =

Small steamboats and motor vessels operating in Coos Bay, Oregon

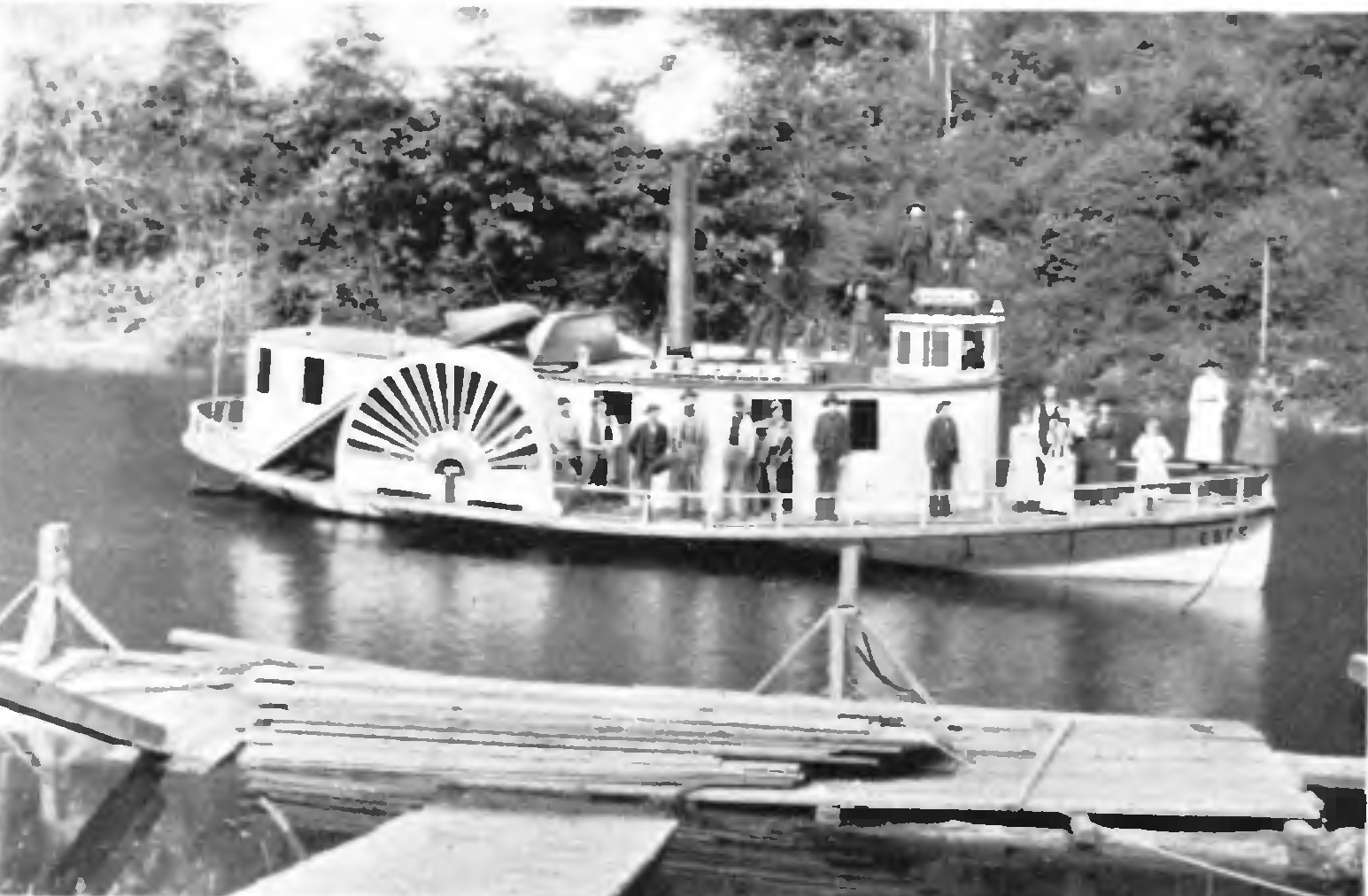
Sidewheel steamboat Coos, sometime before 1895

The Coos Bay Mosquito Fleet comprised numerous small steamboats and motor vessels which operated in the late 19th and early 20th centuries on Coos Bay, a large and mostly shallow harbor on the southwest coast of the U.S. state of Oregon, to the north of the Coquille River valley. Coos Bay is the major harbor on the west coast of the United States between San Francisco and the mouth of the Columbia River.

== Establishment of inland water routes ==
Inland riverboats were used to navigate the bay and the several rivers flow that flow into it. Many of the passages were quite narrow, for example Beaver Slough was aptly named, as every night beavers built dams across the slough which had to be dismantled to allow the passage of Mud Hen.

Nat H. Lane and W.H. Troup, both steamboat captains from the Columbia River, began steamboat operations on Coos Bay in 1873. They built and operated Messenger, doing business as the Coos Bay and Coquille Transportation Company.

One feature of Coos Bay was that one shallow southern arm called Isthmus Slough reaches south almost to Beaver Slough, a shallow north-extending branch of the Coquille River. In 1869 Judge Gilbert Hall built a mule-hauled portage railway across the Isthmus. This line, which was a little over 1.5 miles long, cost $8,000 to build, and consisted of wooden rails laid on rough wooden sleepers, with trestles crossing the ravines that were encountered along the route. The transport on the route consisted of a single wagon carrying a platform, with one man driving the wagon.

Smaller steamboats ran up Isthmus Slough to the north landing to connect to the portage railway, where passengers and freight were transferred to a wagon, and then hauled across the isthmus to Hall's southern landing on Beaver Slough. In 1872, the steamboat Satellite made daily trips from Empire City to Isthmus Slough. Satellite also ran 18 miles up the Coos River twice a week. Once at the south landing, canoes and small unpowered boats carried passengers and freight south to the Coquille River. The journey was about 6 miles from the north landing to the Coquille River. It took one day to make the trip, and the railway carried about 2 tons of freight in a single day. In 1873, about 600 tons of freight were shipped over the line.

In August 1874, construction began on a steam-powered narrow gauge portage railroad to replace the mule-hauled cars. The narrow gauge steam line was called the "Isthmus Transit Railroad".

This was a good shortcut between Marshfield, as Coos Bay was then called, and Coquille, and it also eliminated the need to cross the hazardous Coos and Coquille bars by the ocean.

Frank Lowe had a shipyard in Marshfield, and in the early part of the century he produced many vessels for the Mosquito Fleet, including the propeller Coquille and the sternwheelers Millicoma and Rainbow.

=== Rise of the Mosquito Fleet ===
In 1876, Capt. A. Campbell and son launched the steamer Juno on the Coos River. Captain Campbell ran Juno for over ten years, after which the vessel was commanded by N.J. Cornwall Sometime before 1895, the Campbells sold Juno to W.F. Jewett.

In 1899, the 13-ton propeller steamer Alma (later renamed Jauniata) was built for passenger service on Coos Bay. Gasgo, 8 tons, powered by gasoline, was built in 1900 at Marshfield, and was placed in passenger service on Coos Bay and the Umpqua River. In 1901, the small (9 tons) gasoline-engine launch Relief was built at Marshfield by the Holland Brothers for passenger and towing work on Coos Bay. In 1903, Comet (9 tons), Curlew, Dixie (8 tons), Eagle (12 tons), and Fish were all built at Marshfield for the Coos bay service. Dixie also served on the Coquille River.

In 1907, Max Timmerman launched Bonita (14 tons) and City of Coos Bay (later Sunrise) (13 tons), both used on Coos Bay and the Umpqua River. W.W. Holland built the passenger vessels Beaver (later converted to a tug and renamed Atomic) (8 tons), Express, Queen (14 tons) and Koos (10 tons), all for the Coos Bay service. Other boats built for Coos Bay work 1907 included from Marshfield yards, by G.H. Elliott, Messenger (10 tons), and by Frank Lowe, Telephone (7 tons). At North Bend, Z.A. Kanick built Tioga (11 tons), and at Allegany, H.P. McCallon built Transfer.

In 1908, Peter Olson built Coast (later renamed Enterprise and Arrow No. 5). Arthur Mattson built Marshfield at Eastside. J.D. Ross built Traveler (8 tons) at Pleasant Point and Max Timmerman built Victor (8 tons) and Wolverine (14 tons) at his Marshfield yard. Also in 1908, W.W. Holland built Ranger (12 tons) and Shamrock (8 tons) at Marshfield. North Bend yards also produced a number of smaller vessels in 1908. George Smith built the towboat Arrow, Peter Peterson built Vega, J.H. Cullon builtMawnell (8 tons), and C.A. Johnson built North Star.

In 1909, Timmerman built the gas boats Hercules and Mae, both 12 tons, and Holland built Alice H. (11 tons). In 1912, various yards around Coos Bay built the small gasoline-powered vessels Albatross (13 tons), Freak (11 tons), and Union (7 tons). Turtle (16 tons) was built the same year, and a good photo of her survives, loading wood components, probably ship's knees for the construction of a steam schooner.

1912 was a bad year for wrecks among the mosquito fleet. On March 6, 1912, Curlew, which had been hauling milk from Sumner to Marshfield, collided with the Simpson Lumber Company's tug Columbia at North Bend, and sank as a result. On December 30, 1912, Mayflower burned at Coos Bay. Worst of all, on January 20, 1912, the North Star No. 1, which had been operated by Joseph Yonkers between Marshfield and the South Inlet, drifted over the bar and capsized, drowning Yonkers and five passengers. Bad as this was, it could have been worse, as North Star No. 1 had dropped off 12 passengers at a landing just before the accident.

=== Mission boat Life-Line ===
One of the more unusual vessels built in 1912 was Life-Line, a gasoline-powered 24 horsepower (18 kW) propeller vessel designed by George H. Hitchings and built for use as a mission boat by the Rev. G. L. Hall of the American Baptist Publications Society. Marshall summed up Life-Line's career and ended as follows:

This little ship, under zealot Captain Lund, ran up and down the coast for the Baptist Missionary Society saving the souls of erring seaman and longshoremen alike. After a long and healthy life of do-gooding, she ran ashore just south of Neahkanie. Long forgotten, the little vessel was uncovered by a bulldozer in 1949.

== List of vessels ==
Inland steam and river boats of Coos Bay
Name	Type	Year built	Where built	Builders	Owners	Gross tons	Length	Disposition
Messenger	Sternwheeler	1872	Empire City	Capt. M. Lane		136	91'	Burned 1876 at Coos Bay, total loss
Juno	Propeller	1906	Marshfield			32	60.8'	Unknown
Millicoma	Sternwheeler	1909	Marshfield	Frank Lowe		14	55'	Later converted to gasoline engine, rebuilt 1917 as propeller, ultimate disposition unknown.
Pedler	Sternwheeler	1908	Marshfield	S. Gilroy		407	124'	Unknown, 1910
Fay No. 4	Sternwheeler (gasoline)	1912	North Bend			179	136'	Transferred to California, 1913
Life-Line	Propeller (gasoline)	1912	Marshfield				36'	Foundered off coast June 5, 1923, just south of Neahkanie Mountain, while en route from Coos Bay to Kelso. Crew survived, hull washed ashore and buried by sand.
Rainbow	Sternwheeler	1912	Marshfield	Frank Lowe	Coos River Trans. Co.	75	64'	Abandoned 1923

== Works cited ==
- Marshall, Don B. (1984). Oregon Shipwrecks. Portland, Oregon: Binford and Mort. ISBN 978-0-8323-0430-9.
- McCurdy, H. W.; Seattle Historical Society (1966). Newell, Gordon R. (ed.). The H. W. McCurdy Marine History of the Pacific Northwest. Seattle: Superior Publishing Company. OCLC 2869177.
- Mills, Randall Vause (1977) [1947]. Stern-wheelers up Columbia : A Century of Steamboating in the Oregon Country. Lincoln: University of Nebraska Press. ISBN 978-0-8032-5874-7.
- Timmen, Fritz (1973). Blow for the Landing: A Hundred Years of Steam Navigation on the Waters of the West. Caldwell, Idaho: The Caxton Printers. ISBN 978-0-87004-221-8.
- Wright, E. W. (1895). Lewis & Dryden's Marine History of the Pacific Northwest. Portland, Oregon: Lewis & Dryden Printing Co.
