= Rainbow (sternwheeler) =

- Rainbow coming in to a landing.

History
- Name: Rainbow
- Owner: originally Charles E. Edwards, others later
- Port of registry: Marshfield, Oregon
- Launched: March 29, 1912 Coos Bay
- In service: May 28, 1912
- Out of service: 1923
- Identification: U.S. 209654
- Fate: Scrapped

General characteristics
- Type: Inland passenger/freight
- Length: 64.4 ft (19.63 m)
- Beam: 18 ft (5.49 m)
- Depth: 3.8 ft (1.16 m) depth of hold
- Decks: two
- Installed power: Twin steam engines, horizontally mounted.
- Propulsion: Sternwheel
- Capacity: 100 passengers
- Crew: two (2)

Rainbow was a sternwheel steamboat that was operated in the Coos Bay region of Oregon from 1912 to 1923. Rainbow is sometimes referred to as a "launch", meaning a small steamboat. This vessel's name is sometimes seen as Rain-Bow.

== Design, construction, and launch ==
Shipbuilder Frank Lowe built Rainbow at Marshfield (Coos Bay), Oregon in 1912. The steamer was launched on March 26, 1912, at 7:00 a.m. No formal launching ceremony was held, due to uncertainty of when during the day the launch would occur. Rainbow had been built for Captain Charles E. Edwards, of Allegany, Oregon.

At the time of the launch, Rainbow had no engines, and to install the engines and otherwise prepare the vessel for service, was estimated, at the time of launch, to take about three weeks. Captain Edwards had been in charge of another vessel, the Alert, which he had taken out of service to allow him time to complete the Rainbow. Rainbow however was not completed so quickly, it being reported on May 3, 1912 that the vessel was "rapidly nearing completion."

Rainbow was 64.4 ft (19.63 m) long, with a beam of 18 ft (5.49 m) and depth of hold of 3.8 ft (1.16 m). There were accommodations for 100 passengers The overall size of the steamer was 75 gross tons. and 58 registered tons. Total required crew was shown as only two.

The steamer was reported to have been "built specially for the auto travel so that the part of the journey on water could be made as quickly as possible." Freight was carried on the lower deck, which also included a men's cabin. A women's cabin was on the upper deck, and, when the steamer was placed in service, Captain Edwards intended to establish a restaurant on board.

== Placed into service ==
On May 29, 1912, it was announced that Rainbow would be placed in service on June 1, 1912, on the run from Marshfield to Allegany. The steamer's initial planned use was to take passengers from Marshfield up the Coos River to Allegany, Oregon, where they could take an automobile route to Drain. The automobile route had been established just the year before and was claimed to be the quickest way to reach the main rail line.

Rainbow also transported livestock. On the afternoon of September 3, 1912, a cow broke loose on board and fell into Coos Bay. The crew rescued the animal unharmed with the aid of one of the steamer's boat davits.

== Sunk by snag ==
On March 17, 1913, while running on the route between Marshfield and Allegany on the north fork of the Coos River, 'near the head of navigation Rainbow hit a snag and sank. According to one report, the water was shallow, so that the passengers were able to wait on the vessel's upper deck until they could be taken off by a gasoline launch. The extent of the damage could not be immediately determined.

According to another report, the accident occurred near Ox Head on the north Coos River, when Capt. Herman Edwards was at the vessel's wheel. The boat hit the snag a little below Ox Head but did not begin taking on water until a little further on, when the steamer grounded on a bank in shallow water. Four or five passengers were on board, and all were evacuated safely in small boats. The damage turned out not to be too severe.

== Planned expansion of auto route ==
In May 1913, plans were announced to establish, within a few weeks thereafter, an automobile service route from Allegany to Loon Lake. Rainbow, under Captain Edwards, was to make the water connection on this route, from Allegany to Marshfield.

On June 5, 1913, Rainbow carried a large crowd of passengers into Marshfield for the commencement ceremony at Marshfield High School.

In June, 1913, relief service for Rainbow was performed by the launch Telephone.

As of September 6, 1913, Rainbow was under the command of Capt. Herman Edwards and making tourist excursions on Sundays. Rainbow was employed on an excursion to the life-saving station on Sunday, September 7, 1913, departing from a dock at the rear of the Pioneer Hardware store at 8 a.m., with round-trip fare of 50 cents.

== Machinery accident on board ==
On the evening of September 10, 1913, George Overst, then aged 20, who was serving as a fireman on the Rainbow was seriously injured when his clothing caught around a rotating shaft in the vessel's machinery. He could have been killed except that at just that moment the sternwheeler was coming in to the dock at Marshfield, and the engines were reversed, unwinding Overst's clothing and permitting him to free himself. Overst had only been in Coos Bay a few months and was originally from Sherwood, Oregon.

== Sale and transfer to south fork Coos River ==
On September 26, 1913, Rainbow was advertised as making a connection to a new "auto stage" route that ran from Marshfield to Drain, Oregon via Allegany, Scottburg, and thereafter to Portland. Rainbow boarded passengers every morning at 8:00 a.m. for this route, the fare for which was $11 as far as Drain.

The traffic on the water-overland route from Marshfield to Drain via the water connection at Allegany did not prove to be great enough for Rainbow to sustain a profit. In October, 1913, Captain Edwards made arrangements for the transfer of Rainbow to Herbert H. Rogers and E. George Smith, who intended to place the vessel on the south fork of the Coos River, the demand for steamer services was rising.

It was considered likely that the Express, which had been on the south river run, would be transferred to the north fork, at least until the overhaul of Alert could be completed. The transaction was expected to be effective on about November 1, 1913, when it was estimated that an overhaul of Alert could be completed.

On January 20, 1914, Capt. A.G. Smith was reported to be in command of Rainbow.

On February 28, 1914, Rainbow was hauled out at the Kruse and Banks shipyard in North Bend, Oregon for repainting and maintenance.

As of February 25, 1915, Rainbow was providing service to and from Marshfield on the south fork of the Coos River. The vessel departed from the head of navigation on the south fork every morning at 7:00 a.m. en route to Marshfield, and then left Marshfield at 2:00 p.m. daily going back upriver.

Rainbow was then run in concert with the launch Express, which left Marshfield daily at 8:00 a.m, ran up the south fork of the Coos River, where it departed from the head of navigation at 3:15 pm and returned to Marshfield. The concern of Rogers & Smith were then the proprietors of both Rainbow and Express.

On June 8, 1915, a steam pipe broke on Rainbow, and the vessel lost power. As a result, when an anchor failed to hold, the steamer drifted ashore onto a flat. Rainbow was brought off later without damage, and the anchor was recovered.

George Smith, who by then had been captain of the Rainbow for four years, sold his interest in the Coos River Transportation Company to S.C. Rogers. The place of George Smith as captain was taken by Thomas Smith.

== Lawsuit against the owners ==
The Coos Bay Creamery, circa 1910, with two steamboats drawn up alongside. Larger steamer on the left is the Alert.

In March 1921, a case was heard before the Coos County Circuit Court in which L.A. Blanc, owner of the Coos Bay Creamery, sued the Coos River Transportation Company for $19,000, claiming that sparks from the steamer Rainbow landed on the roof of the creamery, resulting in a fire which destroyed the structure and a large amount of cheese which had been stored inside. The creamery's owner, L.A. Blanc, had filed the legal action on June 1, 1920. The allegations, filed against the company as well as S.C. Rogers and Herbert Rogers, were that in the previous year, in June 1919, the creamery, which had been located on the Coos River about 1.5 miles from Marshfield, was found to be on fire a short time after the Rainbow passed, causing total destruction of the creamery and loss of a large amount of cheese and butter.

The creamery burned on June 16, 1919. Some diary stocks were salvaged from the fire, and at least some of the loss was believed to be covered by insurance.

== Disposition ==
Rainbow was scrapped in 1923.

== See also ==
- Steamboats of Coos Bay
