= Williams River (Oregon) =

River in the United States of America

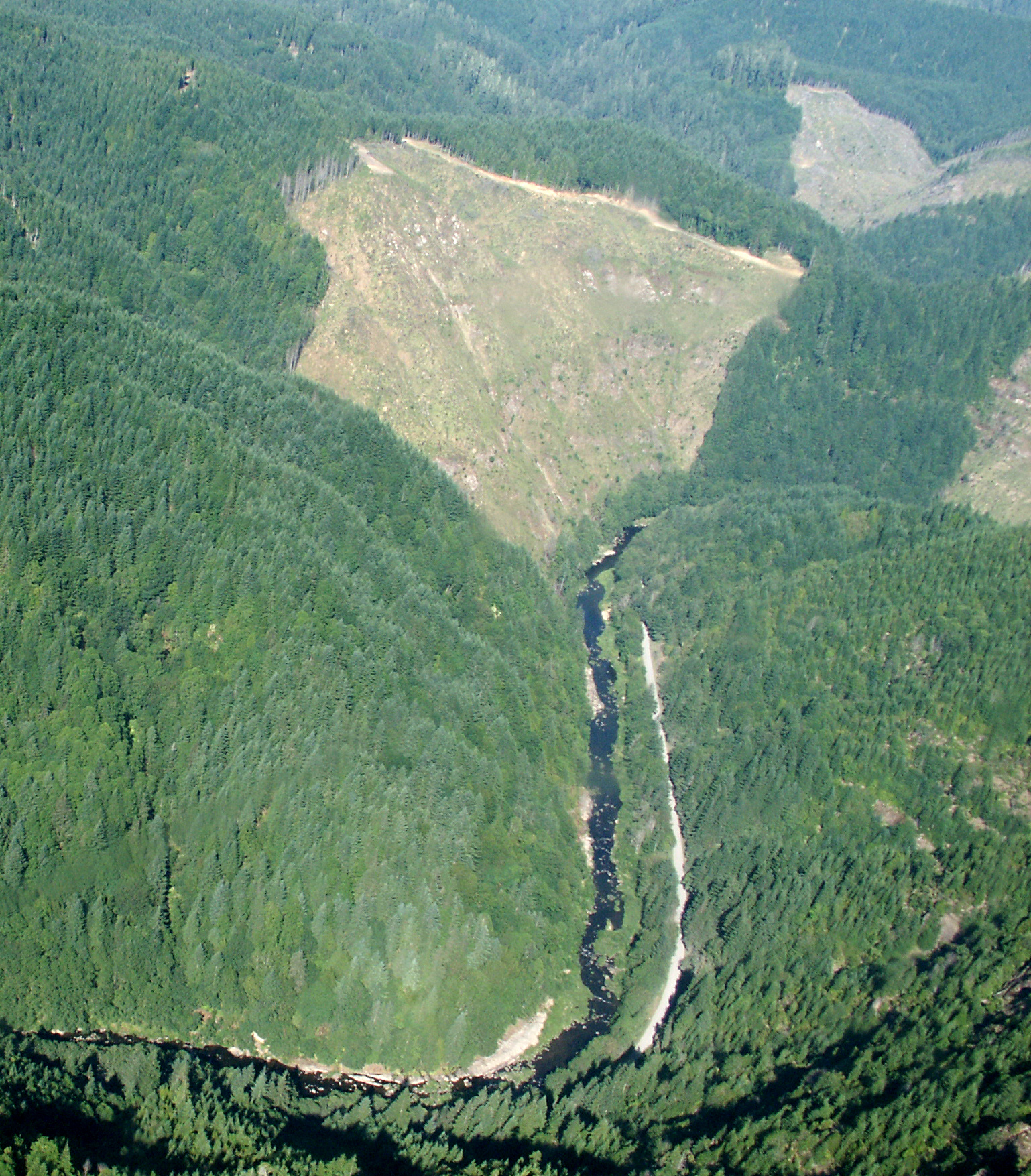
- Clearcuts along the Williams River

- Location of the mouth of the Williams River in Oregon

Location
- Country: United States
- State: Oregon
- County: Douglas and Coos

Physical characteristics
- Source: Confluence of Lost Creek and Little Cow Creek
  - location: western Douglas County, Southern Oregon Coast Range
  - coordinates: 43°11′42″N 123°37′11″W
- Mouth: South Fork Coos River
  - location: eastern Coos County, Southern Oregon Coast Range
  - coordinates: 43°19′06″N 123°48′33″W
  - elevation: 476 ft (145 m)
- Length: 21 mi (34 km)
- Discharge
  - minimum: 1 cu ft/s (0.028 m^{3}/s)

The Williams River is a tributary, about 21 miles (34 km) long, of the South Fork Coos River in the U.S. state of Oregon. Formed by the confluence of Lost Creek and Little Cow Creek, it begins in western Douglas County near the Coos County line and flows generally northwest through the Southern Oregon Coast Range. In eastern Coos County, it joins Tioga Creek to form the South Fork Coos River about 32 miles (51 km) from its confluence with the Millicoma River.

== Course ==
From its source east of Bear Mountain, the Williams River flows northwest through forests south of Yew Ridge in western Douglas County west of Roseburg. Just beyond river mile (RM) 18 or river kilometer (RK) 29, the Williams receives Wilson Creek from the left. Turning north parallel to Threemile Ridge, which is on the left, the river receives Fivemile Creek from the right about a mile further downstream. Below this, Panther Creek enters from the right, and the river turns west, soon receiving Bear Gulch from the left.

Near RM 14 (RK) 23, the Williams leaves Douglas County and enters Coos County, receiving Gooseberry Gulch from the left just beyond the border. Turning northwest, the stream receives Fall Creek from the right, re-entering Douglas County about a mile downstream from where it left it. The river then turns north and receives Cabin Creek from the left. Cedar Creek enters from the right at about RM 8 (RK 13). Curving again to the northwest and then the west, the Williams receives Skip Creek from the right and re-enters Coos County. Bottom Creek enters from the right before the river merges with Tioga Creek to form the South Fork Coos River.

The Williams supports resident trout as well as salmon and steelhead, but access to the stream is limited. Most of the surrounding land is privately owned, and roads are sometimes blocked by gates. Salmon and steelhead fishing is not allowed on the stream, and other fishing is rated poor.

== See also ==
- List of rivers of Oregon

== Works cited ==
- Shewey, John (2007). Complete Angler's Guide to Oregon. Belgrade, Montana: Wilderness Adventures Press. ISBN 978-1-932098-31-0
