= Dellwood, Oregon =

Unincorporated community in the state of Oregon, United States

- Unincorporated community
- Location within the state of Oregon Dellwood (the United States)
- Coordinates: 43°22′08″N 124°00′50″W
- Country: United States
- State: Oregon
- County: Coos
- Elevation: 39 ft (12 m)
- Time zone: UTC-8 (Pacific (PST))
  - Summer (DST): UTC-7 (PDT)
- GNIS feature ID: 1119852

Dellwood is an unincorporated community in Coos County, Oregon, United States. It is about 12 miles (19 km) east of Coos Bay, east of Oregon Route 241 on the South Fork Coos River.

Dellwood was originally named Idlewood, but when a post office was established there in 1940, postal officials did not approve the name because of its similarity to Idleyld in Douglas County. Dellwood was chosen from among several suggestions for its similarity to the old name. The post office closed in 1954.

Dellwood is the site of a Weyerhaeuser log yard and was once a log dump for sending rafts of logs downriver to Coos Bay for export. Access to the South Fork Coos River above Dellwood for recreational use, including hunting and fishing, is regulated by Weyerhaeuser. The Weyerhaeuser sawmill at Dellwood was closed in 1991.
