= Chris Brooks =

Chris or Christopher Brooks may refer to:

- Chris Brooks (wide receiver) (born 1987), American football wide receiver
- Chris Brooks (running back) (born 2000), American football running back
- Chris Brooks (gymnast) (born 1986), American gymnast
- Chris Brooks (ice hockey) (born 1972), Canadian ice hockey player and coach
- Chris Brooks, Canadian doctor, founder of Lifeline Malawi
- Chris Brooks Foster, fictional character from the American TV show, The Young and the Restless
- Chris Brooks (politician) (born 1972), American politician
- Chris Brooks (academic), professor of finance
- Chris Brooks, lead guitarist of American alternative rock band Black Suit Youth
- Chris Brooks, lead singer of the New Zealand rock band Like a Storm
- Christopher Eugene Brooks (1972–2016), American murderer
