= Dellwood =

Dellwood may refer to a location in the United States:

- Dellwood, Minnesota
- Dellwood, Missouri
- Dellwood, New York
- Dellwood, North Carolina
- Dellwood, Oregon
- Dellwood, Adams County, Wisconsin, an unincorporated community in Adams County, Wisconsin
- Dellwood, Sauk County, Wisconsin, an unincorporated community in Sauk County, Wisconsin
- Dellwood Cemetery, a historic cemetery in Manchester Village, Vermont
- Dellwood Country Club, a private country club in New City, New York
