= Christopher Brooke =

Christopher Brooke may refer to:

- Christopher Brooke (poet) (died 1628), English poet, lawyer and politician who sat in the House of Commons between 1604 and 1626
- Christopher N. L. Brooke (1927–2015), British medieval historian
- Christopher Brooke (British Army officer) (1869–1948), Conservative MP for Pontefract
- Christopher Brooke, of Basso & Brooke

== See also ==
- Chris Brooks (disambiguation)
- Christopher Brook (born 1979), American lawyer
