= Millicoma River =

Millicoma River North Fork Coos River
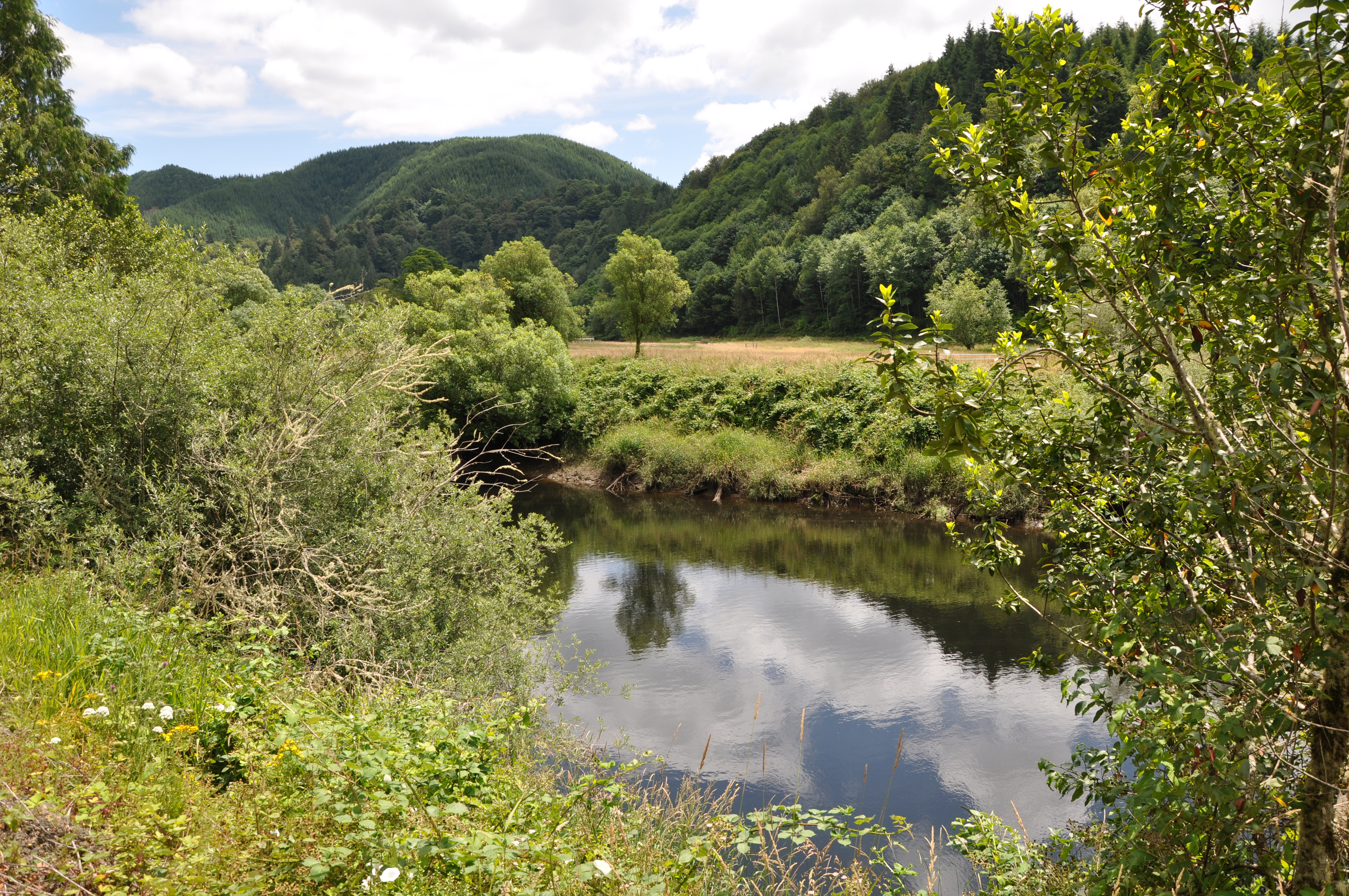
- Millicoma River from Oregon Route 241

- Location of the mouth of the Millicoma River in Oregon
- Etymology: Possibly the Coos people's name for the river

Location
- Country: United States
- State: Oregon
- County: Coos

Physical characteristics
- Source: confluence of the river's east and west forks
  - location: Allegany
  - coordinates: 43°25′28″N 124°01′44″W
  - elevation: 25 ft (7.6 m)
- Mouth: Coos River
  - coordinates: 43°22′48″N 124°05′53″W
  - elevation: 16 ft (4.9 m)
- Length: 8.5 mi (13.7 km)
- Basin size: 149 sq mi (390 km^{2})
- Discharge
  - average: 518 cu ft/s (14.7 m^{3}/s)

The Millicoma River is a coast stream, about 8.5 miles (13.7 km) long, east of Coos Bay in the U.S. state of Oregon. Formed by the confluence of the East Fork Millicoma River and the West Fork Millicoma River at Allegany, it meanders across relatively flat land to meet the South Fork Coos River, with which it forms the Coos River.

Oregon Route 241 (Coos River Highway) runs along the right bank of the river from Allegany to the mouth. The Millicoma meanders generally southwest, receiving Woodruff Creek from the left slightly downstream from Allegany. Deton Creek enters from the right at Rooke Higgins County Park near river mile (RM) 3.5 or river kilometer (RK) 5.6. About a half-mile later, Hendrickson Creek enters from the left. The Millicoma receives Matt Davis Creek from the right just before meeting the South Fork Coos River to form the Coos River about 5 miles (8 km) from the larger stream's mouth on Coos Bay.

The Millicoma supports a large run of shad as well as runs of Chinook salmon and steelhead, all of which may be fished for. It also supports runs of Coho salmon, but fishing for them in the Millicoma is not allowed. Rooke Higgins County Park has a boat launch as does Doras Ramp, near the mouth.

== See also ==
- List of rivers of Oregon

== Works cited ==
- McArthur, Lewis A., and McArthur, Lewis L. (2003) [1928]. Oregon Geographic Names, 7th ed. Portland: Oregon Historical Society Press. ISBN 0-87595-277-1.
- Sheehan, Madelynne Diness (2005). Fishing in Oregon: The Complete Oregon Fishing Guide, 10th ed. Scappoose, Oregon: Flying Pencil Publications. ISBN 0-916473-15-5.
