= Idleyld Park, Oregon =

Unincorporated community in the state of Oregon, United States

- Unincorporated community
- Location within Oregon Location within the United States
- Coordinates: 43°19′25″N 123°01′26″W
- Country: United States
- State: Oregon
- County: Douglas
- Elevation: 774 ft (236 m)
- Time zone: UTC-8 (Pacific (PST))
  - Summer (DST): UTC-7 (PDT)
- ZIP code: 97447
- Area code: 541
- GNIS feature ID: 1122184

Idleyld Park is an unincorporated community in Douglas County, Oregon, United States. Idleyld Park is located along Oregon Route 138 northeast of Glide. Idleyld Park has a post office with ZIP code 97447.

== Climate ==
This region experiences warm (but not hot) and dry summers, with no average monthly temperatures above 71.6 °F. According to the Köppen Climate Classification system, Idleyld Park has a warm-summer Mediterranean climate, abbreviated "Csb" on climate maps.

Climate data for Idleyld Park 4 NE, Oregon, 1991–2020 normals, extremes 1960–2014
Month	Jan	Feb	Mar	Apr	May	Jun	Jul	Aug	Sep	Oct	Nov	Dec	Year
Record high °F (°C)	70 (21)	77 (25)	80 (27)	90 (32)	102 (39)	100 (38)	103 (39)	104 (40)	102 (39)	96 (36)	76 (24)	66 (19)	104 (40)
Mean maximum °F (°C)	55.7 (13.2)	62.7 (17.1)	72.1 (22.3)	80.3 (26.8)	87.8 (31.0)	89.4 (31.9)	96.0 (35.6)	96.2 (35.7)	93.6 (34.2)	78.7 (25.9)	62.8 (17.1)	56.1 (13.4)	98.3 (36.8)
Mean daily maximum °F (°C)	45.8 (7.7)	50.3 (10.2)	56.2 (13.4)	61.9 (16.6)	70.0 (21.1)	75.4 (24.1)	84.4 (29.1)	84.4 (29.1)	77.8 (25.4)	63.7 (17.6)	50.8 (10.4)	44.0 (6.7)	63.7 (17.6)
Daily mean °F (°C)	39.8 (4.3)	42.4 (5.8)	46.1 (7.8)	50.2 (10.1)	56.7 (13.7)	61.3 (16.3)	67.5 (19.7)	67.1 (19.5)	61.7 (16.5)	52.4 (11.3)	44.3 (6.8)	38.6 (3.7)	52.3 (11.3)
Mean daily minimum °F (°C)	33.9 (1.1)	34.5 (1.4)	36.0 (2.2)	38.6 (3.7)	43.4 (6.3)	47.2 (8.4)	50.5 (10.3)	49.8 (9.9)	45.7 (7.6)	41.2 (5.1)	37.7 (3.2)	33.3 (0.7)	41.0 (5.0)
Mean minimum °F (°C)	24.4 (−4.2)	25.5 (−3.6)	27.5 (−2.5)	29.1 (−1.6)	31.9 (−0.1)	36.7 (2.6)	41.8 (5.4)	40.3 (4.6)	35.2 (1.8)	28.7 (−1.8)	26.0 (−3.3)	21.5 (−5.8)	18.9 (−7.3)
Record low °F (°C)	2 (−17)	6 (−14)	16 (−9)	24 (−4)	26 (−3)	31 (−1)	34 (1)	32 (0)	26 (−3)	19 (−7)	13 (−11)	−1 (−18)	−1 (−18)
Average precipitation inches (mm)	8.69 (221)	6.09 (155)	7.03 (179)	5.57 (141)	3.66 (93)	1.86 (47)	0.47 (12)	0.54 (14)	1.62 (41)	5.05 (128)	9.34 (237)	10.68 (271)	60.60 (1,539)
Average snowfall inches (cm)	3.2 (8.1)	2.5 (6.4)	1.0 (2.5)	0.5 (1.3)	0.0 (0.0)	0.0 (0.0)	0.0 (0.0)	0.0 (0.0)	0.0 (0.0)	0.0 (0.0)	0.7 (1.8)	3.8 (9.7)	11.7 (30)
Average precipitation days (≥ 0.01 in)	17.2	15.2	17.5	16.4	11.7	7.5	2.3	2.5	4.7	11.1	17.7	17.7	141.5
Average snowy days (≥ 0.1 in)	1.9	1.6	1.1	0.3	0.0	0.0	0.0	0.0	0.0	0.0	0.4	1.9	7.2
Source: NOAA
