= Life-Line (mission boat) =

Baptist boat

- Life-Line, probably in Coos Bay

History
- Name: Life-Line
- Launched: 1914, Coos Bay
- Fate: Sunk June 5, 1923 off Oregon coast

General characteristics
- Type: Mission boat
- Length: 40.0 ft (12.19 m)
- Installed power: Gasoline engine, 24 horsepower
- Propulsion: Propeller

Life-Line was a Baptist missionary boat used to conduct ministry work in the Coos Bay region of southwestern Oregon, United States, from 1914 to 1923.

== Construction ==
Life-Line was designed by George H. Hitchings and built at Coos Bay for Reverend G. L. Hall of the American Baptist Publication Society. The vessel was 40.0 feet (12.19 m) long, propeller-driven, with a 24-horsepower gasoline engine.

== Operations ==
Once complete, "this little ship, under zealot Captain Lund, ran up and down the coast for the Baptist Missionary Society, saving the souls of erring seamen and longshoremen alike."

== Sinking ==
On May 26, 1923, Life-Line was being taken north from Coos Bay to Kelso, Washington, under command of Captain Lund who was operating the vessel with a deckhand. Life-Line foundered off the coast, just south of Neahkahnie, and Captain Lund and the deckhand swam to shore. The vessel washed ashore and was later covered by the sand, where it was forgotten until 1949, when a bulldozer uncovered the wreck.

== See also ==
- Lifeline (disambiguation)
