= Chris Brooks (academic) =

British economist

Chris Brooks is Professor of Finance in the ICMA Centre, Henley Business School at the University of Reading, United Kingdom.

== Biography ==
Brooks previously held the same titles at the University of Bristol and Bayes (formerly Cass) Business School, City University London. He holds a PhD and a BA in Economics and Econometrics, both from the Department of Economics at the University of Reading. His teaching has included statistics, econometrics, asset pricing and portfolio management, corporate finance and the philosophy of research. Brooks has acted as advisor and consultant to various agencies and companies and has been on the editorial boards of numerous journals including the International Journal of Forecasting, Journal of Business Finance & Accounting, and the British Accounting Review. He was a member of the Accounting and Finance sub-panel for the 2008 Research Assessment Exercise and of the Business and Management sub-panel for the Research Excellence Framework 2014. Brooks is a former member of the Executive Committee of the Conference of Professors of Accounting and Finance and is a member of the ESRC peer review college. He has received research funding from the ESRC and from the Leverhulme Trust, amongst other funders.

== Research ==
Brooks has diverse research interests including asset pricing, fund management, behavioural finance, financial history, and econometric analysis and modelling in finance and real estate. He is author or co-author of over 150 published articles and author or co-editor of seven books that have been cited more than 20,000 times. Brooks is well known as author of the first introductory econometrics textbook targeted at finance students, Introductory Econometrics for Finance (2019, Cambridge University Press), which now is in its fourth edition and has sold over 80,000 copies worldwide since it was first published. Most of his research is available either through the Social Science Research Network (SSRN, Author ID: 14685) or at the CentAUR, University of Reading repository.

== Books ==
- Brooks, C. (2021) First Class Research: A guide to your research project or dissertation in accounting and finance. Finance Books, pp308. ISBN 978-1915189028
- Brooks, C. (2021) Your PhD in accounting or finance. Finance Books, pp363. ISBN 978-1915189035
- Brooks, C. (2019) Introductory econometrics for finance. 4th edition. Cambridge University Press, pp724 ISBN 978-1108436823
- Bell, A., Brooks, C. and Prokopczuk, M., eds. (2013) Handbook of research methods and applications in empirical finance. Edward Elgar, Cheltenham, pp512. ISBN 9780857936080
- Brooks, C. and Tsolacos, S. (2010) Real estate modelling and forecasting. Cambridge University Press, Cambridge, pp474. ISBN 9780521873390
- Brooks, C. (2008) RATS handbook to accompany introductory econometrics for finance. Cambridge University Press, pp213. ISBN 9780521721684

== Selected journal articles ==
Finance:

- Rocciolo, F., Gheno, A. and Brooks, C. (2024) CEO overcaution and capital structure choices. Financial Review, 59 (3). pp. 719–743. ISSN 1540-6288 doi: https://doi.org/10.1111/fire.12383
- Cantarella, S., Hillenbrand, C. and Brooks, C. (2023) Do you follow your head or your heart? The simultaneous impact of framing effects and incidental emotions on investment decisions. Journal of Behavioral and Experimental Economics, 107. 102124. ISSN 2214-8043 doi: https://doi.org/10.1016/j.socec.2023.102124
- Cantarella, S., Hillenbrand, C. and Brooks, C. (2023) Do you follow your head or your heart? The simultaneous impact of framing effects and incidental emotions on investment decisions. Journal of Behavioral and Experimental Economics, 107. 102124. ISSN 2214-8043 doi: https://doi.org/10.1016/j.socec.2023.102124
- Brooks, C., Sangiorgi, I., Saraeva, A., Hillenbrand, C. and Money, K. (2023) The importance of staying positive: the impact of emotions on attitude to risk. International Journal of Finance and Economics, 28 (3). pp. 3232–3261. ISSN 1099-1158 doi: https://doi.org/10.1002/ijfe.2591
- Brooks, C. and Williams, L. (2023) People are people: a comparative analysis of risk attitudes across Europe. International Journal of Finance &amp; Economics. ISSN 1099-1158 doi: https://doi.org/10.1002/ijfe.2837
- Bell, A. R., Brooks, C. and Brooks, R. (2023) Are English football players overvalued? Applied Economics. ISSN 1466-4283 doi: https://doi.org/10.1080/00036846.2023.2192032
- Brooks, C., Schopohl, L. and Walker, J. T. (2023) Comparing perceptions of the impact of journal rankings between fields. Critical Perspectives on Accounting, 90. 102381. ISSN 1045-2354 doi: https://doi.org/10.1016/j.cpa.2021.102381
- Bell, A. R., Brooks, C. and Killick, H. (2022) The first real estate bubble? Land prices and rents in medieval England c. 1300-1500. Research in International Business and Finance, 62. 101700. ISSN 0275-5319 doi: https://doi.org/10.1016/j.ribaf.2022.101700
- Bell, A. R., Brooks, C. and Urquhart, A. (2022) Why have UK universities become more indebted over time? International Review of Economics and Finance, 82. pp. 771–783. ISSN 1059-0560 doi: https://doi.org/10.1016/j.iref.2022.08.008
- Rocciolo, F., Gheno, A. and Brooks, C. (2022) Explaining abnormal returns in stock markets: an alpha-neutral version of the CAPM. International Review of Financial Analysis, 82. 102143. ISSN 1057-5219 doi: https://doi.org/10.1016/j.irfa.2022.102143
- Hillenbrand, C., Saraeva, A., Money, K. and Brooks, C. (2022) Saving for a rainy day... or a trip to the Bahamas? How the framing of investment communication impacts retail investors. British Journal of Management, 33 (2). pp. 1087–1109. ISSN 1467-8551 doi: https://doi.org/10.1111/1467-8551.12455
- Brooks, C. and Williams, L. (2022) When it comes to the crunch: retail investor decision-making during periods of market volatility. International Review of Financial Analysis, 80. 102038. ISSN: 1873-8079. doi: 10.1016/j.irfa.2022.102038
- Brooks, C. and Williams, L. (2021). "The impact of personality traits on attitude to financial risk". Research in International Business and Finance, 58. 101501. ISSN 0275-5319. doi:10.1016/j.ribaf.2021.101501.
- Brooks, C., Schopohl, L. and Walker, J. (2021). "Comparing perceptions of the impact of journal rankings between fields". Critical Perspectives on Accounting. ISSN 1045-2354. doi:10.1016/j.cpa.2021.102381.
- Rendall, S., Brooks, C. and Hillenbrand, C. (2021). "The impacts of emotions and personality on borrowers' abilities to manage their debts". International Review of Financial Analysis. 101703. ISSN 1057-5219. doi:10.1016/j.irfa.2021.101703.
- Hillenbrand, C., Saraeva, A., Money, K. and Brooks, C. (2021) Saving for a rainy day... or a trip to the Bahamas? How the framing of investment communication impacts retail investors. British Journal of Management. ISSN 1467-8551 doi: https://doi.org/10.1111/1467-8551.12455
- Brooks, C. and Schopohl, L. (2021) Green accounting and finance: advancing research on environmental disclosure, value impacts and management control systems. The British Accounting Review, 53 (1). 100973. ISSN 0890-8389 doi: https://doi.org/10.1016/j.bar.2020.100973
- Tao, R., Brooks, C. and Bell, A. (2020) Tomorrow's fish and chip paper? Slowly incorporated news and the cross-section of stock returns. European Journal of Finance. ISSN 1466-4364 doi: https://doi.org/10.1080/1351847X.2020.1846575
- Hillenbrand, C., Saraeva, A., Money, K. and Brooks, C. (2020) To invest or not to invest? The roles of product information, attitudes towards finance and life variables in retail investor propensity to engage with financial products. British Journal of Management, 31 (4). pp. 688–708. ISSN 1467-8551 doi: https://doi.org/10.1111/1467-8551.12348
- Tao, R., Brooks, C. and Bell, A. R. (2020) When is a MAX not the MAX? How news resolves information uncertainty. Journal of Empirical Finance, 57. pp. 33–51. ISSN 0927-5398 doi: https://doi.org/10.1016/j.jempfin.2020.03.002
- Bell, A., Brooks, C. and Killick, H. (2019) A reappraisal of the freehold property market in late medieval England. Continuity and Change, 34 (3). pp. 287–313. ISSN 1469-218X doi: https://doi.org/10.1017/S0268416019000316
- Rocciolo, F., Gheno, A. and Brooks, C. (2019) Optimism, volatility and decision-making in stock markets. International Review of Financial Analysis, 66. 101356. ISSN 1057-5219 doi: https://doi.org/10.1016/j.irfa.2019.05.007
- Hillenbrand, C., Money, K. G., Brooks, C. and Tovstiga, N. (2019) Corporate tax: what do stakeholders expect? Journal of Business Ethics, 158 (2). pp. 403–426. ISSN 1573-0697 doi: https://doi.org/10.1007/s10551-017-3700-6
- Bell, A. R. and Brooks, C. (2019) Is there a 'magic link' between research activity, professional teaching qualifications and student satisfaction? Higher Education Policy, 32 (2). pp. 227–248. ISSN 1740-3863 doi: https://doi.org/10.1057/s41307-018-0081-0
- Brooks, C., Fenton, E., Schopohl, L. and Walker, J. (2019) Why does research in finance have so little impact? Critical Perspectives on Accounting, 58. pp. 24–52. ISSN 1045-2354 doi: https://doi.org/10.1016/j.cpa.2018.04.005
- Brooks, C., Sangiorgi, I., Hillenbrand, C. and Money, K. (2019) Experience wears the trousers: exploring gender and attitude to financial risk. Journal of Economic Behavior & Organization, 163. pp. 483–515. ISSN 0167-2681 doi: https://doi.org/10.1016/j.jebo.2019.04.026
- Brooks, C., Hoepner, A. G. F., McMillan, D., Vivian, A. and Wese Simen, C. (2019) Financial data science: the birth of a new financial research paradigm complementing econometrics? European Journal of Finance, 25 (17). pp. 1627–1636. ISSN 1466-4364 doi: https://doi.org/10.1080/1351847x.2019.1662822
- Brooks, C., Sangiorgi, I., Hillenbrand, C. and Money, K. (2018) Why are older investors less willing to take financial risks? International Review of Financial Analysis, 56. pp. 52–72. ISSN 1057-5219 doi: https://doi.org/10.1016/j.irfa.2017.12.008
- Brooks, C. and Schopohl, L. (2018) Topics and trends in finance research: what is published, who publishes it and what gets cited? The British Accounting Review. ISSN 0890-8389 doi: https://doi.org/10.1016/j.bar.2018.02.0
- Brooks, C., Chen, Z. and Zeng, Y. (2018) Institutional cross-ownership and corporate strategy: the case of mergers and acquisitions. Journal of Corporate Finance, 48. pp. 187–216. ISSN 0929-1199 doi: https://doi.org/10.1016/j.jcorpfin.2017.11.003
- Bell, A. R. and Brooks, C. (2018) Is there a 'Magic Link' between research activity, professional teaching qualifications and student satisfaction? Higher Education Policy. ISSN 1740-3863 doi: https://doi.org/10.1057/s41307-018-0081-0
- Brooks, C. and Oikonomou, I. (2018) The effects of environmental, social and governance disclosures and performance on firm value: a review of the literature in accounting and finance. The British Accounting Review, 50 (1). pp. 1–15. ISSN 0890-8389 doi: https://doi.org/10.1016/j.bar.2017.11.005
- Hillenbrand, C., Money, K. G., Brooks, C. and Tovstiga, N. (2017) Corporate tax: what do stakeholders expect? Journal of Business Ethics. ISSN 1573-0697 doi: https://doi.org/10.1007/s10551-017-3700-6
- Brooks, C. (2017) The impact of foreign real estate investment on land prices: evidence from Mauritius. Review of Development Economics, 21 (4). e131-e146. ISSN 1467-9361 doi: https://doi.org/10.1111/rode.12316
- Bell, A. R. and Brooks, C. (2017) What makes students satisfied? A discussion and analysis of the UK's national student survey. Journal of Further and Higher Education. ISSN 1469-9486 doi: https://doi.org/10.1080/0309877X.2017.1349886
- Brooks, C., Balatti, M. and Kappou, K. (2017) Fundamental indexation revisited: new evidence on alpha. International Review of Financial Analysis, 51. pp. 1–15. ISSN 1057-5219 doi: https://doi.org/10.1016/j.irfa.2017.02.010
- Brooks, C., Godfrey, C., Hillenbrand, C. and Money, K. (2016) Do investors care about corporate tax? Journal of Corporate Finance, 38. pp. 218–248. ISSN 0929-1199 doi:10.1016/j.jcorpfin.2016.01.013
- Brooks, C., Fernandez-Perez, A., Miffre, J. and Nneji, O. (2016) Commodity risks and the cross-section of equity returns. The British Accounting Review, 48 (2). pp. 134–150. ISSN 0890-8389 doi:10.1016/j.bar.2016.03.001
- Brooks, C., Burke, S. P. and Stanescu, S. (2016) Finite sample weighting of recursive forecast errors. International Journal of Forecasting, 32 (2). pp. 458–474. ISSN 0169-2070 doi:10.1016/j.ijforecast.2015.05.003
- Brooks, C., Prokopczuk, M. and Wu, Y. (2015) Booms and busts in commodity markets: bubbles or fundamentals?Journal of Futures Markets, 35 (10). pp. 916–938. ISSN 1096-9934 doi:10.1002/fut.21721
- Oikonomou, I., Brooks, C. and Pavelin, S. (2014) The financial effects of uniform and mixed corporate social performance. Journal of Management Studies, 51(6). pp. 898–925. ISSN 1467-6486 doi:10.1111/joms.12064
- Anderson, K. and Brooks, C. (2014) Speculative bubbles and the cross-sectional variation in stock returns. International Review of Financial Analysis, 35. pp. 20–31. ISSN 1057-5219 doi:10.1016/j.irfa.2014.07.004
- Miffre, J. and Brooks, C. (2013) Do long-short speculators destabilise commodity futures markets? International Review of Financial Analysis, 30. pp. 230–240. ISSN 1057-5219 doi:10.1016/j.irfa.2013.09.002
- Miffre, J., Brooks, C. and Li, X. (2013) Idiosyncratic volatility and the pricing of poorly-diversified portfolios. International Review of Financial Analysis, 30. pp. 78–85. ISSN 1057-5219 doi:10.1016/j.irfa.2013.05.007
- Brooks, C., Cerny, A. and Miffre, J. (2012) Optimal hedging with higher moments. Journal of Futures Markets, 32 (10). pp. 909–944. ISSN 1096-9934 doi:10.1002/fut.20542
- Anderson, K., Brooks, C. and Katsaris, A. (2010) Speculative bubbles in the S&P 500: was the tech bubble confined to the tech sector? Journal of Empirical Finance, 17 (3). pp. 345–361. ISSN 0927-5398 doi:10.1016/j.jempfin.2009.12.004
- Brammer, S., Brooks, C. and Pavelin, S. (2006) Corporate social performance and stock returns: UK evidence from disaggregate measures. Financial Management, 35 (3). pp. 97–116. ISSN 1755-053X doi:10.1111/j.1755-053X.2006.tb00149.x
- Anderson, K. and Brooks, C. (2006) The long-term price-earnings ratio. Journal of Business Finance and Accounting, 33 (7–8). pp. 1063–1086. ISSN 1468-5957 doi:10.1111/j.1468-5957.2006.00621.x
- Brooks, C. and Katsaris, A. (2005) A three-regime model of speculative behaviour: modelling the evolution of the S&P 500 composite index. The Economic Journal, 115 (505). pp. 767–797. ISSN 1468-0297 doi:10.1111/j.1468-0297.2005.01019.x
- Shields, K., Olekalns, N., Henry, Ó. T. and Brooks, C. (2005) Measuring the response of macroeconomic uncertainty to shocks. Review of Economics and Statistics, 87 (2). pp. 362–370. ISSN 1530-9142 doi:10.1162/0034653053970276
- Brooks, C., Clare, A. D., Dalle Molle, J. W. and Persand, G. (2005) A comparison of extreme value theory approaches for determining value at risk. Journal of Empirical Finance, 12 (2). pp. 339–352. ISSN 0927-5398 doi:10.1016/j.jempfin.2004.01.004
- Brooks, C., Burke, S. P., Heravi, S. and Persand, G. (2005) Autoregressive conditional kurtosis. Journal of Financial Econometrics, 3 (3). pp. 399–421. ISSN 1479-8417 doi:10.1093/jjfinec/nbi018
- Brooks, C. and Katsaris, A. (2005) Trading rules from forecasting the collapse of speculative bubbles for the S&P 500 composite index. Journal of Business, 78 (5). pp. 2003–2036. ISSN 0740-9168

Real Estate:

- Bell, A. R., Brooks, C. and Taylor, N. (2016) Time-varying price discovery in the eighteenth century: empirical evidence from the London and Amsterdam stock markets. Cliometrica Journal of Historical Economics and Econometric History, 10 (1). pp. 5–30. ISSN 1863-2505 doi:10.1007/s11698-014-0120-z
- Nneji, O., Brooks, C. and Ward, C. (2015) Speculative bubble spillovers across regional housing markets. Land Economics, 91 (3). pp. 516–535. ISSN 1543-8325 doi:10.3368/le.91.3.516
- Nneji, O., Brooks, C. and Ward, C. (2013) Commercial real estate and equity market bubbles: are they contagious to REITs? Urban Studies, 50 (12). pp. 2496–2516. ISSN 1360-063X doi:10.1177/0042098013477700
- Nneji, O., Brooks, C. and Ward, C. (2013) Intrinsic and rational speculative bubbles in the US housing market 1960–2011. Journal of Real Estate Research, 35 (2). pp. 121–151. ISSN 0896-5803
- Anderson, K., Brooks, C. and Tsolacos, S. (2011) Testing for periodically collapsing rational speculative bubbles in US REITs. Journal of Real Estate Portfolio Management, 17 (3). pp. 227–241. ISSN 1083-5547

History:

- Bell, A. R., Brooks, C. and Killick, H. (2019) Medieval property investors, ca. 1300-1500. Enterprise and Society, 20 (3). pp. 575–612. ISSN 1467-2235 doi: https://doi.org/10.1017/eso.2018.92
- Bell, A. R., Brooks, C. and Moore, T. K. (2017) Cambium non est mutuum: exchange and interest rates in medieval Europe. The Economic History Review, 70 (2). pp. 373–396. ISSN 1468-0289 doi:10.1111/ehr.12374
- Bell, A. R., Brooks, C. and Moore, T. K. (2017) Did purchasing power parity hold in medieval Europe? The Manchester School, 85 (6). pp. 682–709. ISSN 1467-9957 doi: https://doi.org/10.1111/manc.12167
- Bell, A. R., Brooks, C. and Moore, T. K. (2016) Did purchasing power parity hold in medieval Europe? The Manchester School. ISSN 1467-9957 doi:10.1111/manc.12167
- Bell, A. R., Brooks, C. and Moore, T. K. (2014) The credit relationship between Henry III and merchants of Douai and Ypres, 1247–70. Economic History Review, 67 (1). pp. 123–145. ISSN 1468-0289 doi:10.1111/1468-0289.12013
- Bell, A. R., Brooks, C. and Moore, T. K. (2009) Interest in Medieval accounts: examples from England, 1272–1340. History, 94 (316). pp. 411–433. ISSN 1468-229X doi:10.1111/j.1468-229X.2009.00464.x
- Bell, A. R., Brooks, C. and Dryburgh, P. R. (2007) Interest rates and efficiency in medieval wool forward contracts. Journal of Banking & Finance, 31 (2). pp. 361–380. ISSN 0378-4266 doi:10.1016/j.jbankfin.2006.04.006
