= LifeLines =

Open-source genealogy program

- Original author: Tom Wetmore
- Developer: The LifeLines Team
- Release: 23 September 1992; 33 years ago
- Stable release: 3.1.1 / 17 March 2016
- Written in: C
- Operating system: Unix-like, Microsoft Windows, Mac OS X
- Available in: English, Danish, Dutch, French, German, Polish, and Swedish
- Type: Genealogy software
- License: MIT license
- Website: lifelines.sourceforge.net lifelines.github.io/lifelines/
- Repository: github.com/lifelines/lifelines

LifeLines is a free open-source genealogy software tool to assist family history research. LifeLines primary strengths are its powerful scripting language and the ability to easily import and export information in the GEDCOM format. It was the first open-source genealogy program for Unix. The Lifelines scripting language is now supported by several other open-source programs.

== History ==
Lifelines version 1.0 was written by Tom Wetmore in the fall and winter of 1990/91 for his private use. Lifelines version 2.0 was released 23 September 1992 to the public. Lifelines version 3.0 was released 12 October 1994.

Lifelines is maintained by a team of volunteers. In April 2016 the code was moved to GitHub and a new release numbered 3.1.0 was issued.

LifeLines uses a text-based curses interface. A couple of experimental GUI interfaces were in development, but lacked the stability and core functionality to make them suitable for release.
