= Lifeline Center for Child Development =

Coordinates: 40.73886°N 73.73285°W

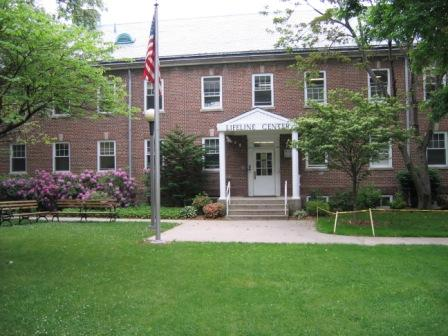
- Lifeline Campus

Location
- 80-09 Winchester Blvd, Queens Village, NY; United States

Information
- Established: 1959
- Founder: Ethel S. Wyner, Ed.D
- Executive Director: Tanya Simon
- Grades: Preschool - grade 12

The Lifeline Center for Child Development in Queens, NY, is a non-profit State Office of Mental Health (SOMH) licensed children's day treatment center and special school serving emotionally disturbed children and their families from the New York metropolitan area. Founded by Ethel Wyner in 1959, the Lifeline Center has grown and expanded over the years to include a New York State Education Department chartered K-12 school, a preschool and evaluation program approved by both NYC and Nassau County, and a state-licensed day treatment center.

Lifeline considers children exhibiting the following symptoms for admission: fearfulness, anxiety, hyperactivity, depression, impulsivity, language delays (expressive and/or receptive), withdrawal, autistic-like and psychotic behavior, or those having difficulty getting along with people and the world around them. Lifeline serves seriously disturbed children with disabilities including pervasive developmental disorder, Asperger syndrome, psychosis attention-deficit hyperactivity disorder, oppositional defiant disorder and severe adjustment disorder. Lifeline's campus consists of two buildings and a swimming pool set on three acres.

== History ==
Wyner founded the Lifeline Center in 1959, as the mental health therapeutic direction in the US was moving away from surgical solutions and toward social milieu therapy. At this time there were few options for parents of mentally or emotionally challenged children who were seeking help. As Wyner stated for an interview with City Limits magazine in 1998, "The options back then were to put them in the state hospitals. Or you could take them to private clinics, which even back in the fifties cost something like $20,000 a year."

"Over the years, Wyner and her staff have created a model facility for educating and treating children from ages 4 through 16 (sic: current age range is 3-18) whose mental illness places them on the severe end of the spectrum of emotional disturbance. The students, who are referred by the Board of Education, are among the toughest cases to deal with--toddlers who are so deeply withdrawn they hardly notice when a visitor enters their classroom, hyperactive or aggressive grade-schoolers who frayed the nerves of their special ed teachers, psychotic teens who would be prone to hurting themselves if they didn't stick to a strict regimen of counseling and medication."
