= Allegany, Oregon =

Unincorporated community in the state of Oregon, United States

- Unincorporated community
- Location within the state of Oregon Allegany (the United States)
- Coordinates: 43°25′34″N 124°1′25″W
- Country: United States
- State: Oregon
- County: Coos
- Elevation: 43 ft (13 m)
- Time zone: UTC-8 (Pacific (PST))
  - Summer (DST): UTC-7 (PDT)
- ZIP codes: 97407
- Area codes: 541, 458
- GNIS feature ID: 1116873
- Coordinates and elevation from Geographic Names Information System

Allegany is an unincorporated community in Coos County, Oregon, United States. It lies at the upstream end of the Millicoma River, where the East Fork Millicoma River and West Fork Millicoma River join to form the main stem, a short tributary of the Coos River. Oregon Route 241 passes through Allegany. The community borders the Elliott State Forest.

The Golden and Silver Falls State Natural Area is a state park northeast of Allegany. It features two 100-foot (30 m) waterfalls in an old-growth forest setting.

== History ==
A post office was established at Allegany on March 25, 1893, and it is unknown why this spelling was chosen. Allegany is used for several geographic features in the state of New York, while Allegheny is the preferred spelling in Pennsylvania. William Vincamp was the first post master.

Due to the lack of good roads and other more modern transportation in these areas, the small (14 tons) gasoline-propeller Welcome, built 1919, was on the run up the Coos River from Marshfield to Allegany until 1948.
