= Golden and Silver Falls State Natural Area =

State park in Oregon

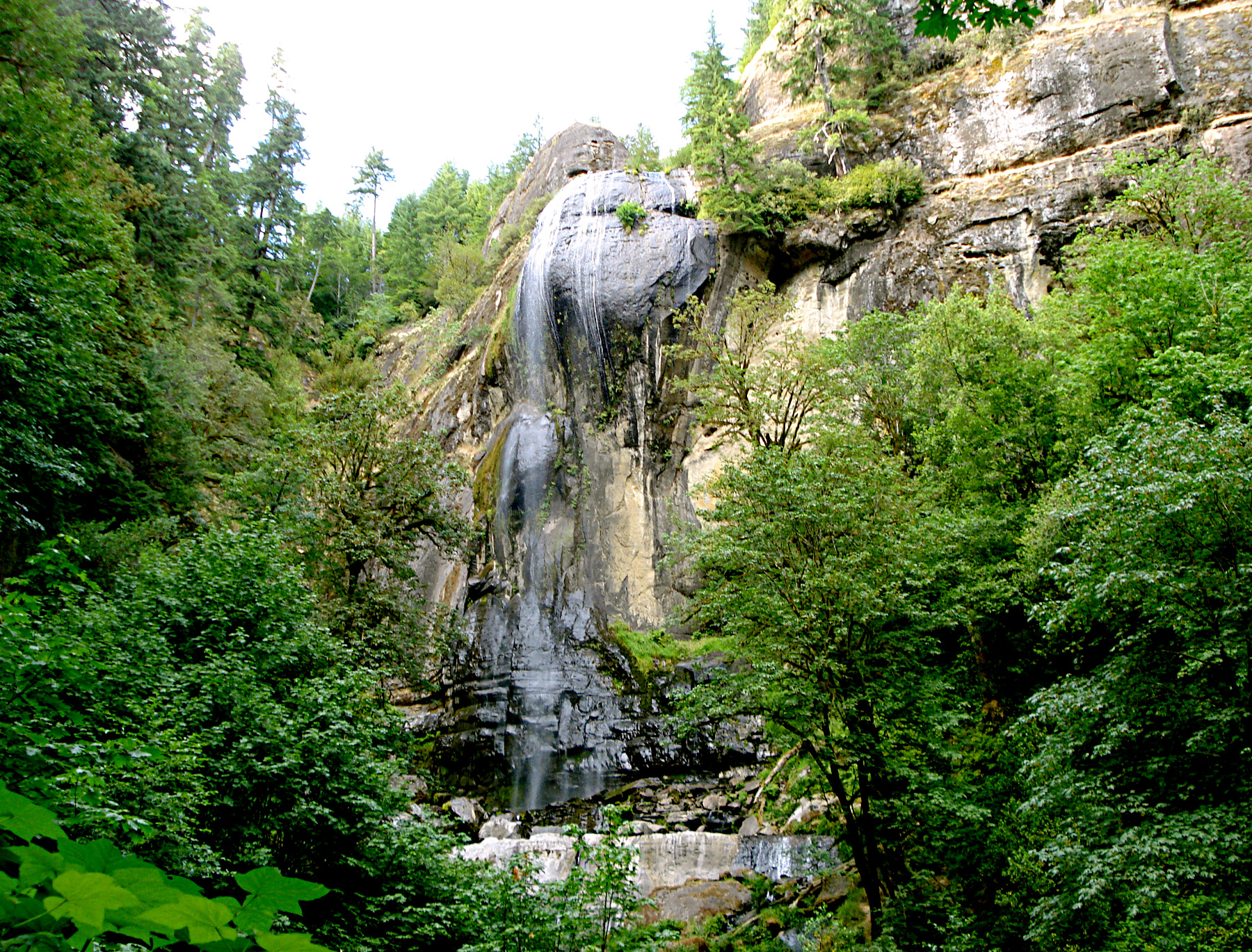
- Golden and Silver Falls State Natural Area, July 2009

- Location within Oregon Location within the United States
- Type: Public, state
- Location: Coos County, Oregon
- Nearest city: Coos Bay
- Coordinates: 43°29′04″N 123°55′56″W
- Operator: Oregon Parks and Recreation Department

Golden and Silver Falls State Natural Area is a state park in Coos County, Oregon, United States, administered by the Oregon Parks and Recreation Department. The nearest settlement is Allegany.

== See also ==
- List of Oregon state parks
