= Lifeline Malawi =

Canada-based charity

- Founder: Chris Brooks
- Purpose: Health
- Location: Surrey, British Columbia, Canada
- Region served: Malawi
- Website: lifelinemalawi.com

Lifeline Malawi is a registered Canadian humanitarian medical relief and development organization. In 2001, Dr. Chris Brooks established the first medical outreach clinic in the community of Ngodzi, approximately 100 km from the capital city of Lilongwe, on land that was donated by the community. The organization follows a community-based medical clinic delivery model to provide primary health care services, maternity programs, HIV/AIDS counseling, testing and ARV treatment; family planning, and immunizations for children to the local community. Lifeline Malawi also partners with the local district health program for sanitation and communicable disease control.

In 2013, founder Dr. Chris Brooks received the Diamond Jubilee Medal.
