= Oregon Route 241 =

State highway in Coos County, Oregon, US

Oregon Route 241
- Route 241 highlighted in red

Route information
- Maintained by ODOT
- Length: 18.92 mi (30.45 km)
- Existed: 2003–present

Major junctions
- West end: US 101 in Coos Bay
- East end: Northeast of Allegany

Location
- Country: United States
- State: Oregon
- County: Coos

Highway system
- Oregon Highways; Interstate; US; State; Named; Scenic
← OR 240	→ OR 242

Oregon Route 241 (OR 241) is an Oregon state highway running from U.S. Route 101 (US 101) in Coos Bay to Nesika County Park in Coos County. OR 241 is known as the Coos River Highway No. 241 (see Oregon highways and routes). It is 18.94 miles (30.48 km) long and runs east–west, entirely within Coos County.

OR 241 was established as part of Oregon's project to assign route numbers to highways that previously were not assigned.

== Route description ==
OR 241 begins at the intersection of US 101 and Newport Avenue in an area known as Bunker Hill just south of Coos Bay. It travels east along Newport Avenue into Coos Bay and turns north onto 6th Avenue and east on D Street to leave Coos Bay. (The route is locally maintained within Coos Bay city limits.) OR 241 turns northeast again as it leaves Coos Bay, and travels through Allegany to just east of Nesika County Park, where it ends. A county road continues to Golden and Silver Falls State Park.

== History ==
OR 241 was assigned to the Coos River Highway on January 15, 2003, but by July 2008, OR 241 was not signed with route markers. But as of 2018, route signs have been installed at the west terminus at US 101. The west terminus was rebuilt in 2022.

== Major intersections ==
Milepoints are as reported by ODOT and do not necessarily reflect current mileage. Z indicates overlapping mileage due to construction longer than established route, and – indicates negative mileage behind established beginning point. Segments that are locally maintained may be omitted. For routes traversing multiple named state highways, each milepoint is preceded by the corresponding state highway number. The entire route is in Coos County.

Location	Milepoint	Destinations	Notes
Coos Bay	0.00	US 101 – Coos Bay, North Bend, Coquille, Bandon	Western terminus
	19.15	Glenn Creek Road	Eastern terminus
1.000 mi = 1.609 km; 1.000 km = 0.621 mi
