= Elliott State Forest =

State Forest in Coos and Douglas counties, Oregon, United States

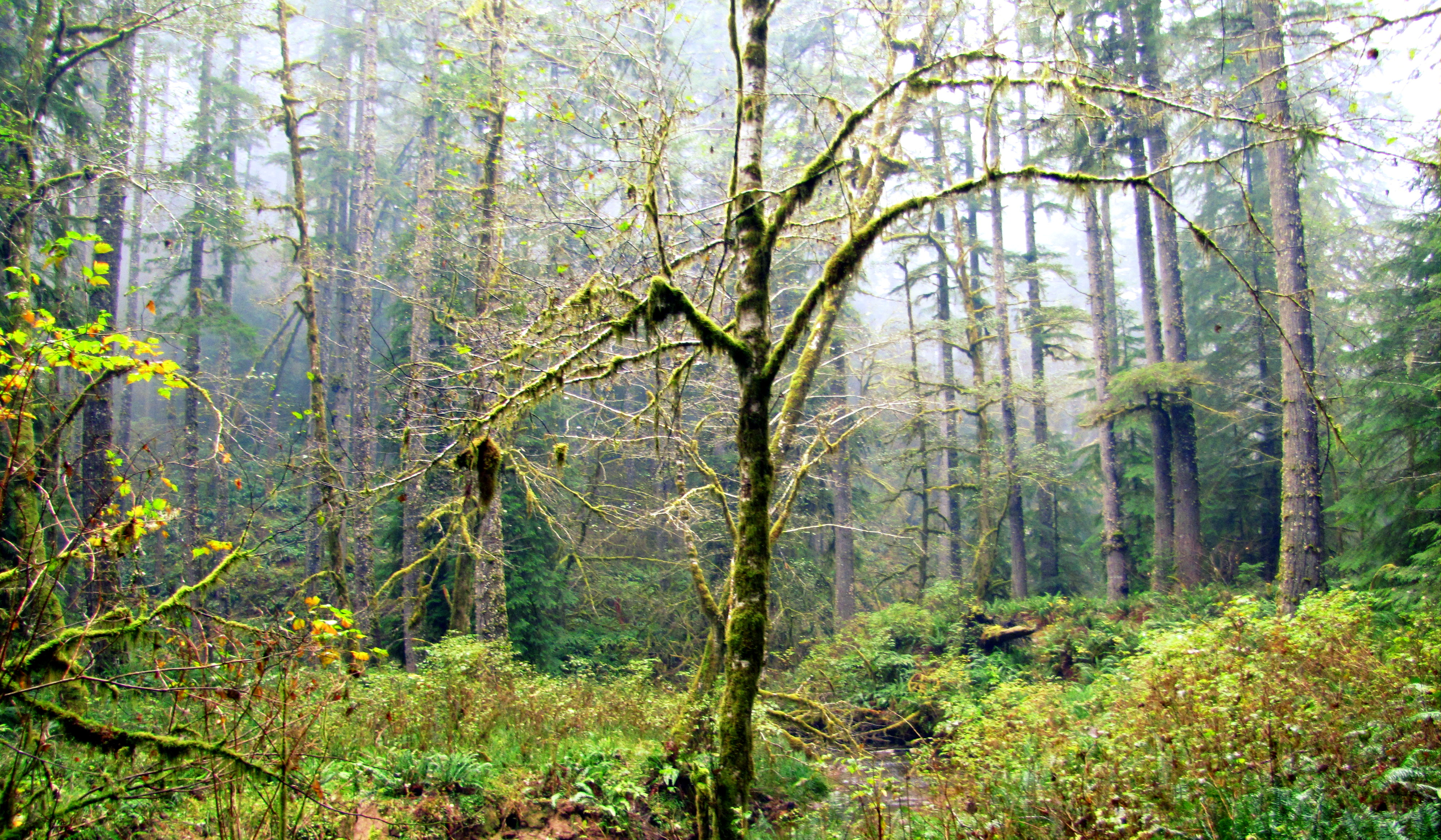
- Elliott State Forest, November 2013
- Interactive map of Elliott State Forest
- Type: State forest, park
- Location: Coos and Douglas counties, Oregon United States
- Nearest city: Reedsport and Coos Bay
- Coordinates: 43°35′05″N 124°01′04″W
- Area: 93,000 acres (380 km^{2})
- Created: 1930
- Operator: Oregon Department of Forestry

Elliott State Forest is a state forest in Coos and Douglas counties of the U.S. state of Oregon, between Coos Bay and Reedsport in the Oregon Coast Range. The first state forest established in Oregon, it is named after the state's first state forester Francis Elliott. Trees commonly found in this forest are the Douglas-fir, western hemlock, western redcedar, bigleaf maple, and red alder.

More than 90 percent of the Elliott State Forest forms part of Oregon Common School Fund (CSF) lands devoted to supporting public education statewide. The Oregon Department of Forestry manages the CSF lands for the Oregon State Land Board, composed of Oregon's governor, secretary of state, and treasurer. Timber revenue from logging in the Elliott State Forest has generated about $284 million for schools since 1955. (sourced to a dead link)

== Climate ==
Climate data for Elliott State Forest
Month	Jan	Feb	Mar	Apr	May	Jun	Jul	Aug	Sep	Oct	Nov	Dec	Year
Mean daily maximum °F (°C)	51.9 (11.1)	54.8 (12.7)	57.6 (14.2)	60.5 (15.8)	64.9 (18.3)	68.7 (20.4)	72.5 (22.5)	72.9 (22.7)	71.8 (22.1)	65.6 (18.7)	55.9 (13.3)	51.0 (10.6)	62.3 (16.8)
Mean daily minimum °F (°C)	36.6 (2.6)	37.5 (3.1)	38.8 (3.8)	40.4 (4.7)	44.5 (6.9)	48.2 (9.0)	51.2 (10.7)	51.2 (10.7)	47.5 (8.6)	43.4 (6.3)	39.7 (4.3)	36.2 (2.3)	42.9 (6.1)
Average precipitation inches (mm)	11.80 (300)	9.13 (232)	8.08 (205)	5.20 (132)	3.49 (89)	2.29 (58)	0.57 (14)	0.91 (23)	2.13 (54)	4.77 (121)	10.10 (257)	10.52 (267)	68.99 (1,752)
Average snowfall inches (cm)	0.1 (0.25)	0.6 (1.5)	0.1 (0.25)	0.1 (0.25)	0 (0)	0 (0)	0 (0)	0 (0)	0 (0)	0 (0)	0 (0)	0.3 (0.76)	1.2 (3.0)

== History ==
A management plan, adopted in 1995, called for 25 million board feet from 1,000 acres (400 ha), half of it clearcut. A new management plan adopted by the land board in October 2011 aimed to increase annual net revenue from the forest to $13 million, up from $8 million. This would be achieved by increasing the annual timber harvest to 40 million board feet culled from 1,100 acres (450 ha), of which about three-fourths could be clearcut.

The plan also changed the way in which the forest is managed to protect threatened and endangered species such as spotted owls and marbled murrelets. Supporters of the new plan say it will benefit wildlife by making more acres off-limits to logging than had been reserved for owls, murrelets, and watershed protection under the old plan. Opponents of the plan say it will damage habitat and harm wildlife. They would prefer a plan that promotes thinning of young trees, avoids clear-cutting, and seeks other ways of raising revenue from the CSF lands.

At the February 2017 meeting of the Oregon State Land Board (OSLB) in Salem the board voted 2 to 1 in favor of amending the Protocol, the formalized process of sale. Additionally, the Oregon Department of State Lands (DSL) director Jim Paul was instructed to prepare a plan for retained public ownership and to present that plan at the next OSLB meeting.

In 2012 and prior years, Elliott State Forest timber sales contributed substantial profits to the Common School Fund, typically on the order of $5 million per year. In 2013 and 2014, timber sales were below costs. Timber sales turned around in 2015 resulting in revenue of $0.7 million in 2015 for the Common School Fund. At the meeting, DSL director Jim Paul announced the Elliott generated $1.3 million in revenue for the Common School Fund as a preliminary figure.

The value of Elliott State Forest was originally assessed at between $260 and $440 million, prompting the DSL set its value at the midpoint, $360 million, according to Secretary of State Dennis Richardson at the meeting. Given the February 2017 amendments to the Protocol, the purchase proposal of $221 million created by Elliott Forest, LLC will require revision. Elliott Forest LLC has two members: a company in Roseburg with international investors known as Lone Rock Timber Management Company, and the Pacific Northwest Cow Creek Band of Umpqua Tribe of Indians.

On May 9, 2017 the OSLB unanimously voted to cancel the sale process of the Elliott, ensuring that the forest would remain publicly owned.

== See also ==
- List of Oregon state forests
