= Southern Oregon Coast Range =

Mountain range in Oregon, United States

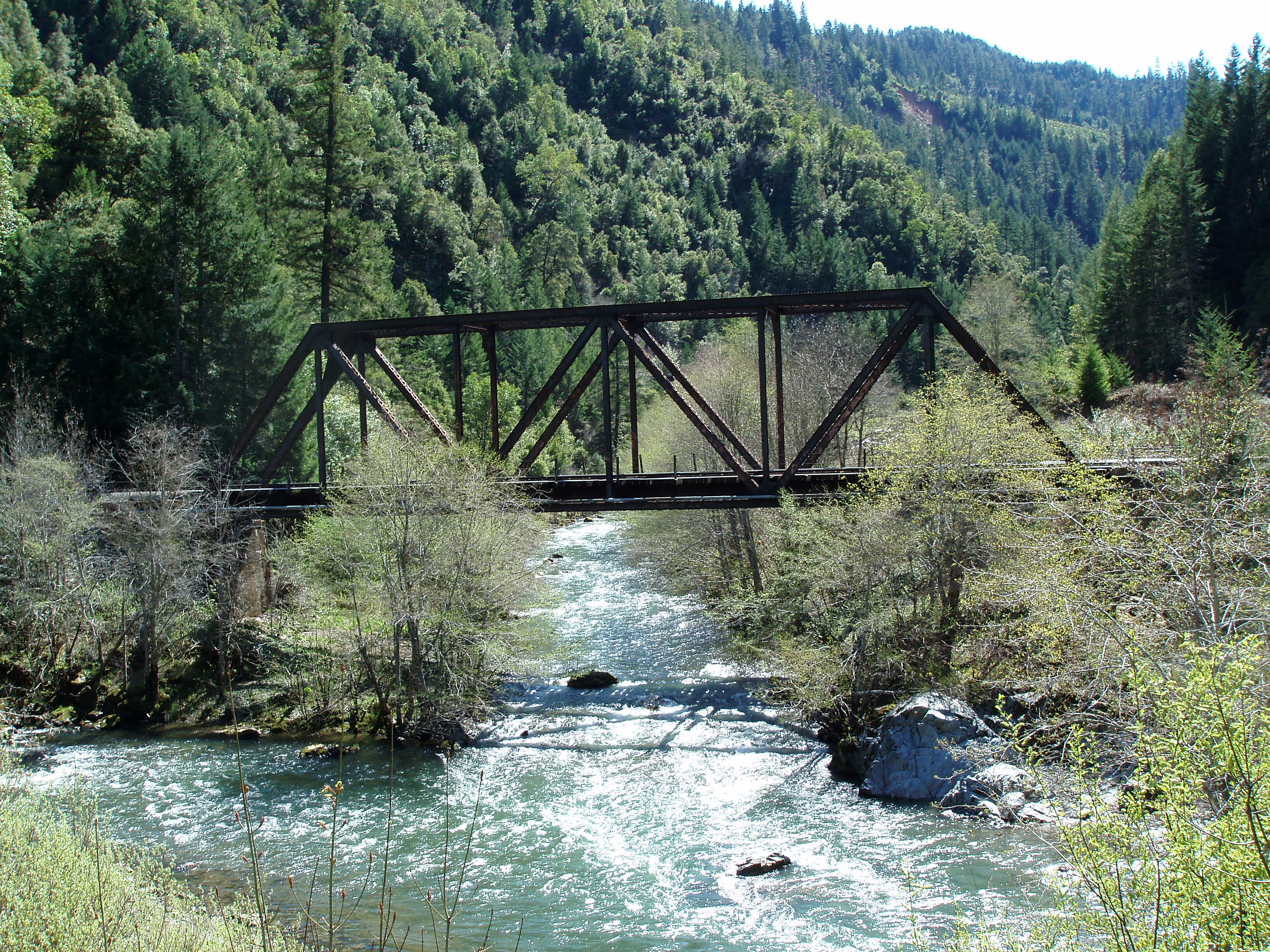
- Cow Creek, a tributary of the South Umpqua River

Highest point
- Peak: Bone Mountain
- Elevation: 3,540 ft (1,080 m)
- Coordinates: 42°54′58″N 123°51′00″W

Dimensions
- Length: 55 mi (89 km) North-South

Geography
- Location within Oregon
- Country: United States
- State: Oregon
- Parent range: Oregon Coast Range, Pacific Coast Ranges
- Borders on: Central Oregon Coast Range and Klamath Mountains

Geology
- Rock ages: Paleocene and Eocene
- Rock types: volcanic and forearc basin

The Southern Oregon Coast Range is the southernmost section of the Oregon Coast Range, in the Pacific Coast Ranges, located in the southwest portion of the state of Oregon, United States, roughly between the Umpqua River and the middle fork of the Coquille River, beyond which are the Klamath Mountains. To the east is the Umpqua Valley and to the west the Pacific Ocean. This approximately 55-mile (89 km)-long mountain range contains mountains as high as 3,547 feet (1,081 m) for Bone Mountain. The mountains are known locally in the Roseburg area as the Callahan Mountains, or simply as The Callahans.

== Geology ==
As with the Oregon Coast Range as a whole, the Southern Oregon Coast Range likely began as an ocean island chain that collided with the continental tectonic plate of North America more than 60 million years ago. In the Southern Range the 64-million-year-old Roseburg Volcanics that formed this section are the oldest portions of the entire range. The range is part of a forearc basin that has slowly rotated about 51 degrees since the Eocene period. Much of the mountain structures are pillow basalt formations created during the volcanic period and then uplifted with the collision into the North American Plate. Other geologic features are mainly the result of erosion and weather forces carving steam beds and valleys out of the rock formations.

== Flora and fauna ==
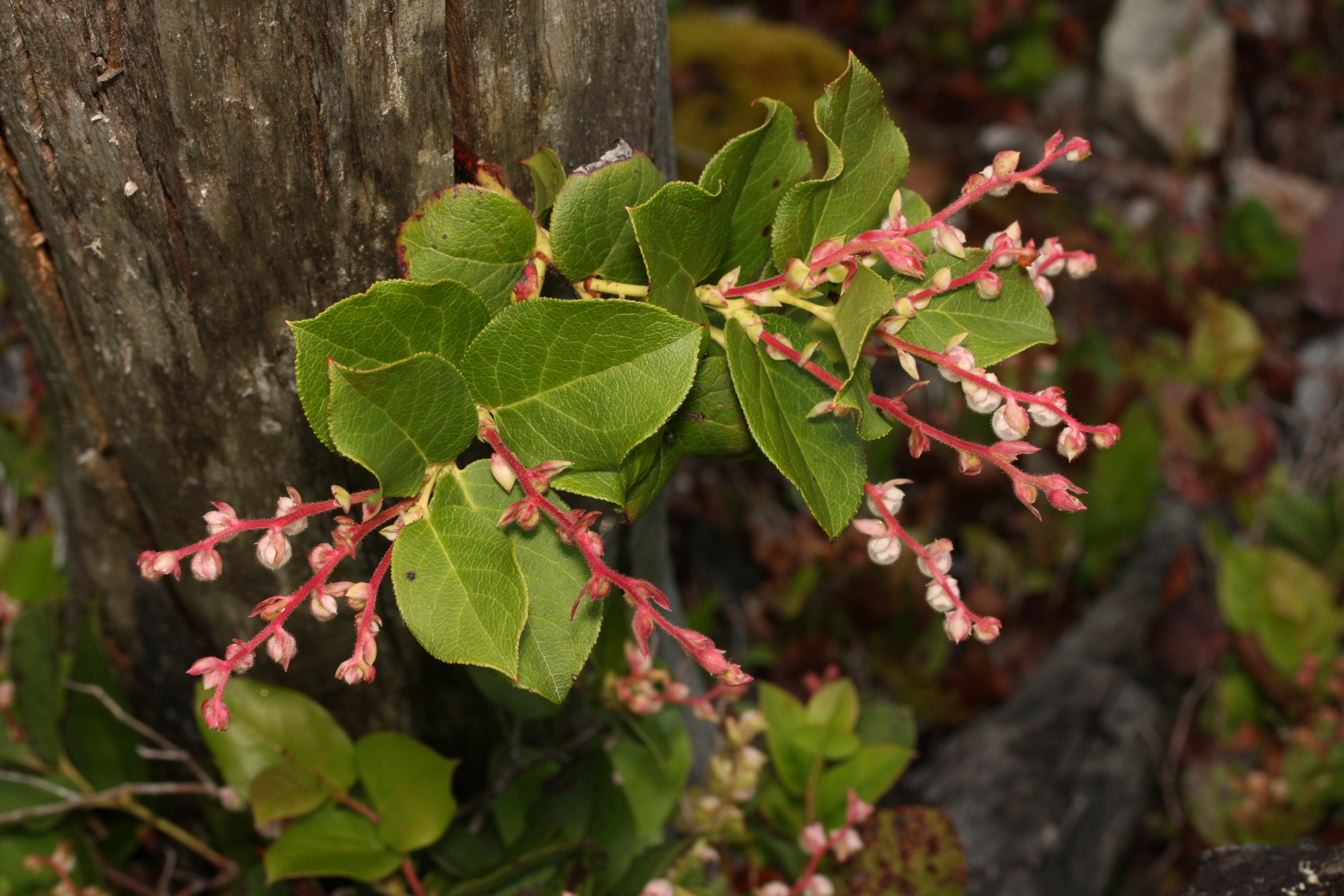
Salal (Gaultheria shallon)

The Oregon Coast Range is home to over 50 mammals, 100 species of birds, and nearly 30 reptiles or amphibians that spent a significant portion of their life cycle in the mountains. Birds living in the Southern Coast Range include a variety of smaller and larger bird species. These include northern goshawks, peregrine falcons, pileated woodpeckers, olive-sided flycatcher, and western bluebirds. The northern spotted owl, listed as a threatened species by the United States also inhabit the mountain forests. Aquatic life includes river lamprey, Pacific lamprey, coastal cutthroat trout, Millicoma longnose dace, Umpqua chub, red-legged frogs, southern seep salamander, western pond turtles, coho salmon, Chinook salmon, steelhead trout, and others. Other wildlife includes fringed myotis bats, long-legged myotis bats, Townsend's big-eared bat, fishers, and sharptail snakes, northern flying squirrels, red tree voles, Roosevelt elk, among others. Other small animals include shrews, moles, deer mice, and ermine.

Plants include large stands of Douglas-fir trees, western hemlock forests, cedar trees, with portions of these forests including old-growth stands. Other flora include Sitka spruce, salmonberry, salal, tanoak, and western azalea. Portions of the range are in the Elliott State Forest.

== Location and climate ==
The range begins around the Umpqua River with the Central Oregon Coast Range to the north. Oregon Route 38 is the general divide between the two sections. On the southern end the Coquille River's middle fork provides the general dividing line between the Central Range and the Klamath Mountains to the south and east.

The climate of the mountains is of the mild maritime variety. It is characterized by cool dry summers followed by mild and wet winters. Most precipitation falls in the form of rain, with snow during the winter months at the higher elevations. Annual precipitation varies from 60 to 120 inches (1,500 to 3,000 mm), with more in the higher elevations. The average high temperature in January is 36.3 °F (2.4 °C), and the average high in July is 61.9 °F (16.6 °C) with temperature also varying by elevation.

== Peaks ==
All peaks in the range are over 3,000 feet (910 m) in elevation.

Mountain name	Elevation		County
	feet	metres	
Bone Mountain	3,547	1,081	Coos
Kenyon Mountain	3,300	1,006	Coos
Buzzard Rock	3,051	930	Douglas
Bear Mountain	3,031	924	Douglas

== Rivers ==
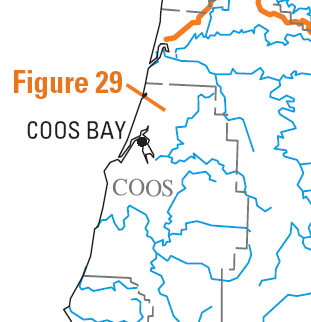
Map of the region with major rivers in blue. Orange line shows divide between watersheds flowing to the coast and those flowing north or east.

The following rivers have portions of their headwaters in the Southern Oregon Coast Range:

- Drains to Pacific Ocean:
  - Coos River
  - Coquille River
  - Umpqua River

== See also ==
- U.S. Route 101
