= Coos River =

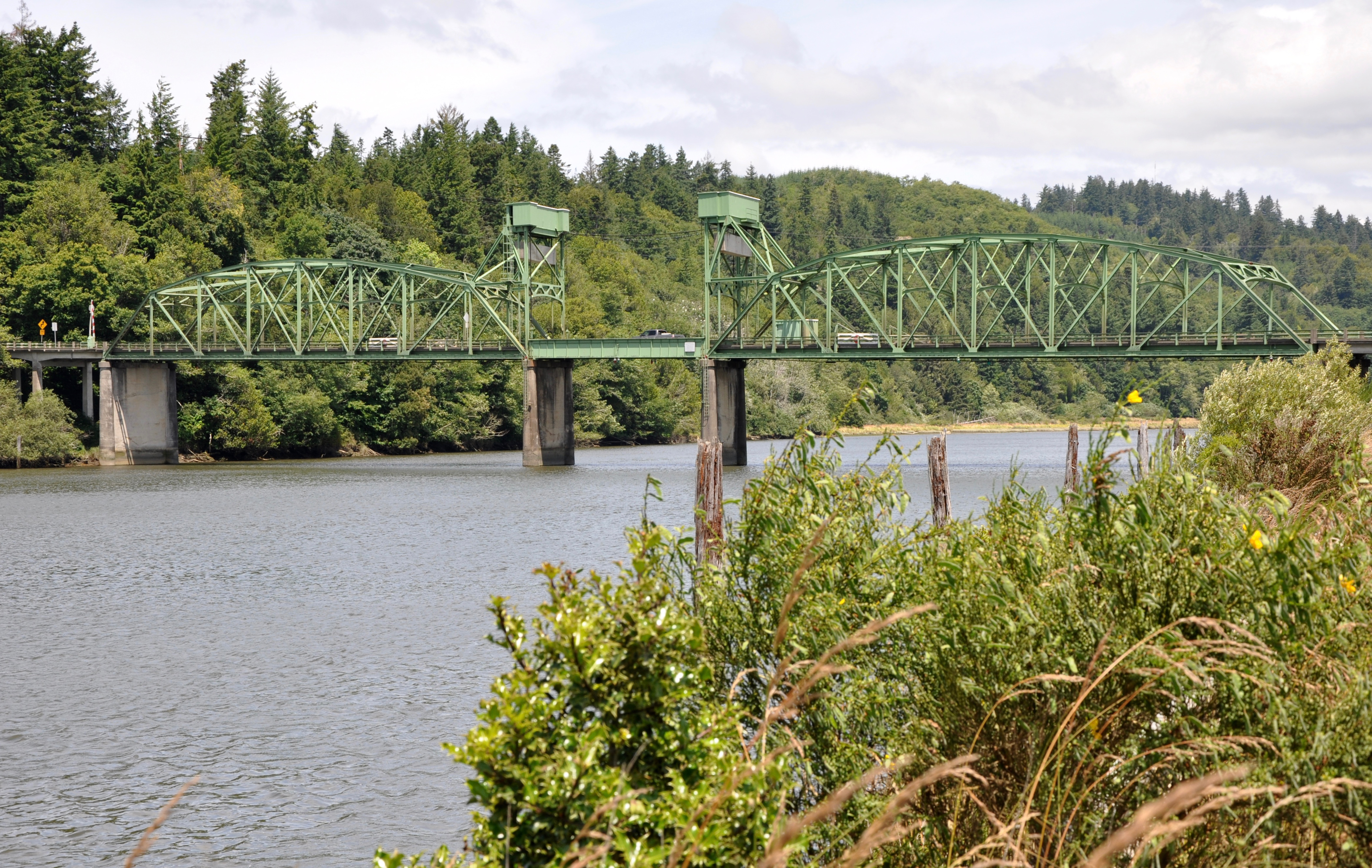
- Coos River at the Chandler Bridge

- Location of the mouth of the Coos River in Oregon
- Etymology: Indian name for a native tribe living near Coos Bay

Location
- Country: United States
- State: Oregon
- County: Coos

Physical characteristics
- Source: Confluence of Millicoma River and South Fork Coos River
  - location: Coos County, Oregon
  - coordinates: 43°22′39″N 124°05′57″W
  - elevation: 13 ft (4.0 m)
- Mouth: Coos Bay
  - location: Coos Bay, Coos County, Oregon
  - coordinates: 43°21′45″N 124°10′25″W
  - elevation: 0 ft (0 m)
- Length: 5 mi (8.0 km)
- Basin size: 730 sq mi (1,900 km^{2})
- Discharge
  - average: 1,441 cu ft/s (40.8 m^{3}/s)

The Coos River flows for about 5 miles (8.0 km) into Coos Bay along the Pacific coast of southwest Oregon in the United States. Formed by the confluence of its major tributaries, the South Fork Coos River and the Millicoma River, it drains an important timber-producing region of the Southern Oregon Coast Range. The course of the main stem and the major tributaries is generally westward from the coastal forests to the eastern end of Coos Bay near the city of Coos Bay.

The river is the largest tributary of Coos Bay, which at about 10,000 acres (4,000 ha) is the largest estuary that lies entirely within Oregon. The river enters the bay about 15 miles (24 km) from where the bay—curving east, north, and west of the cities of Coos Bay and North Bend and passing by the communities of Barview and Charleston—meets the ocean. About 30 other tributaries also enter the bay directly.

Most of the Coos River watershed of 730 square miles (1,900 km^{2}) is in Coos County, but 147 square miles (380 km^{2}) are in eastern Douglas County. Commercial forests cover about 85 percent of the basin.

The river supports populations of chinook and coho salmon, Pacific lamprey, western brook lamprey, shad, steelhead, and coastal cutthroat trout. Since public river-bank access is limited, fishing is often done by boat.

== Course ==
Flowing west from the confluence of the South Fork Coos River and the Millicoma River, the Coos River is bordered by Oregon Route 241 (Coos River Highway) on the right and Coos River Road on the left. Downstream from its source, the river receives Noah Creek from the right 4 miles (6.4 km) from the river mouth. Curving south, the river receives Vogel Creek and then Lillian Creek, both from the left, before passing under Chandler Bridge, which carries Route 241 from the right bank to the left bank about 2 miles (3 km) from the mouth. The river then turns west and north as it enters the bay and splits into two distributaries separated by a marsh. The Cooston Channel, which is on the right, continues north around the west side of the marsh for about 1 mile (1.6 km) to the mouth. The left-hand channel almost immediately merges with Catching Slough, which enters from the left and continues around the east side of the marsh to meet the Marshfield Channel of the bay.

=== Discharge ===
Estimates of the average discharge of the Coos River varies from 90 cubic feet per second (2.5 m^{3}/s) in late summer to 5,500 cubic feet per second (160 m^{3}/s) in February. Estimated extremes vary from a low of 50 cubic feet per second (1.4 m^{3}/s) to a high of 100,000 cubic feet per second (2,800 m^{3}/s).

== See also ==
- List of rivers of Oregon

== Works cited ==
- McArthur, Lewis A., and McArthur, Lewis L. (2003) [1928]. Oregon Geographic Names, 7th ed. Portland: Oregon Historical Society Press. ISBN 0-87595-277-1.
- Sheehan, Madelynne Diness (2005). Fishing in Oregon: The Complete Oregon Fishing Guide, 10th ed. Scappoose, Oregon: Flying Pencil Publications. ISBN 0-916473-15-5.
- Larsen, Erik. Lamprey in the Coos Estuary. Partnership for Coastal Watersheds, 23 Apr. 2014, www.partnershipforcoastalwatersheds.org/wordpress/wp-content/uploads/2015/10/FINAL-Lamprey-Data-Summary-03122014.pdf. Pamphlet.
