= Ebenezer Joseph Mather =

- Born: 12 June 1849; Stafford, Staffordshire, England
- Died: 23 November 1927 (aged 78)
- Resting place: Canvey Island, England
- Occupation(s): Social activist, accountant, writer
- Known for: Founder of the Fishermen's Mission

Ebenezer Joseph Mather (12 June 1849 – 23 December 1927) was the founder of The Royal National Mission to Deep Sea Fishermen now often abbreviated as the Fishermen's Mission. He is affectionally remembered as 'the fisherman's friend'.

== Early life ==
Ebenezer was born on 12 June 1849 at Foregate Street, Stafford, England. He was the son of shoe manufacturer Henry Penkett Mather and his wife Elizabeth Douthwaite. Ebenezer was raised as a member of the Plymouth Brethren; however, in later life he joined the Church of England and remained Anglican for the rest of his life. According to the 1871 census, he was noted as an auditor. Ebenezer married his first wife, Caroline Eliza Lough, in Islington on 4 September 1872. After various moves and a growing family, Ebenezer moved to Islington, where he became secretary of the 'Thames Church Mission Society' which was founded in 1844.

== Fishermen's Mission ==
Ebenezer founded "The National Mission to Deep Sea Fishermen" in 1881 after being shocked by the poor conditions in which fishermen worked and lived. In the 19th century fishing was notoriously dangerous with high fatality rates. In 1896 the mission was given the royal approval by Queen Victoria, adding 'Royal' to the mission's name. The mission went on to help many during WW1 and WW2 as scores of fisherman's trawlers were used to help merchant convoys and defense against attacks from the air as well as mine sweeping. The mission still operates to this day.

== Writings ==
According to the Bibliography of Australian Literature, Ebenezer wrote a fiction piece called 'The Squatter's Bairn'. He also wrote 'Nor'ard of the Dogger'and 'Deep sea Trials and Gospel Triumphs in 1887.

== Later life ==
Ebenezer Mather retired to Canvey Island, where he published his biography, Memories of Christian Service. He married his second wife, May Ethel Timewell (who was his nurse), on 16 June 1925. Only two years later, Ebenezer died of heart failure. On 28 December 1927, he was buried at St Katherine's Churchyard on Canvey Island.

== See also ==
- Sailors' Society
- Mission to Seafarers
