= Sea Sunday =

Christian holiday to honor seafarers and their families

Sea Sunday celebrations in Mauritius

Sea Sunday is the day which many Christian Churches set aside to remember and pray for seafarers and their families and give thanks for their lives and work. It is officially held on the second Sunday in July. During Sea Sunday, charities such as the Stella Maris, The Mission to Seafarers and the Sailors' Society as well as non-denominational groups such as Sea Cadets conduct fundraisers, hold parades, and run awareness campaigns about life at sea.

== Religious organisations ==
Sea Sunday is supported by The Mission to Seafarers and the Sailors' Society. Many churches around the world hold celebrations, services and collections to support the work of seafarers around the world.

In the Catholic Church, Sea Sunday is supported by the Stella Maris. A second collection is held during Catholic Sea Sunday Mass, with all funds raised going to the Stella Maris to support its work. It is a day of remembrance, prayer and celebration, and an opportunity to think about and thank those seafarers who work tirelessly throughout the year bringing us goods we often take for granted.

== Religious resources ==
All three agencies create church and fundraising resources for their annual Sea Sunday campaigns to help their respective churches to understand and celebrate Sea Sunday.
