= Centres for Seafarers =

Ecumenical collaboration

Centres for Seafarers Logo

Centres for Seafarers was an ecumenical collaboration between The Apostleship of the Sea, The Sailors Society and The Mission to Seafarers. It was a registered UK charity formed in 2006 and dissolved on 2 April 2019.

It provided visiting seafarers a place to rest and relax and allow them time away from their ships whilst docked. Games, books, food and drink and also chaplains and a place to worship were available to visiting seafarers in two ports throughout the UK.

== Locations ==
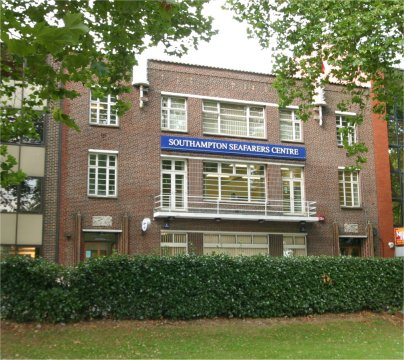
The first Centres for Seafarers in Southampton, England

The charity had port chaplains and centres at various ports around the UK.

== See also ==
- Sailors Society (Protestant)
- Apostleship of the Sea, (Roman Catholic)
- Mission to Seafarers (Anglican)
