= RV George Bligh =

Fisheries research vessel

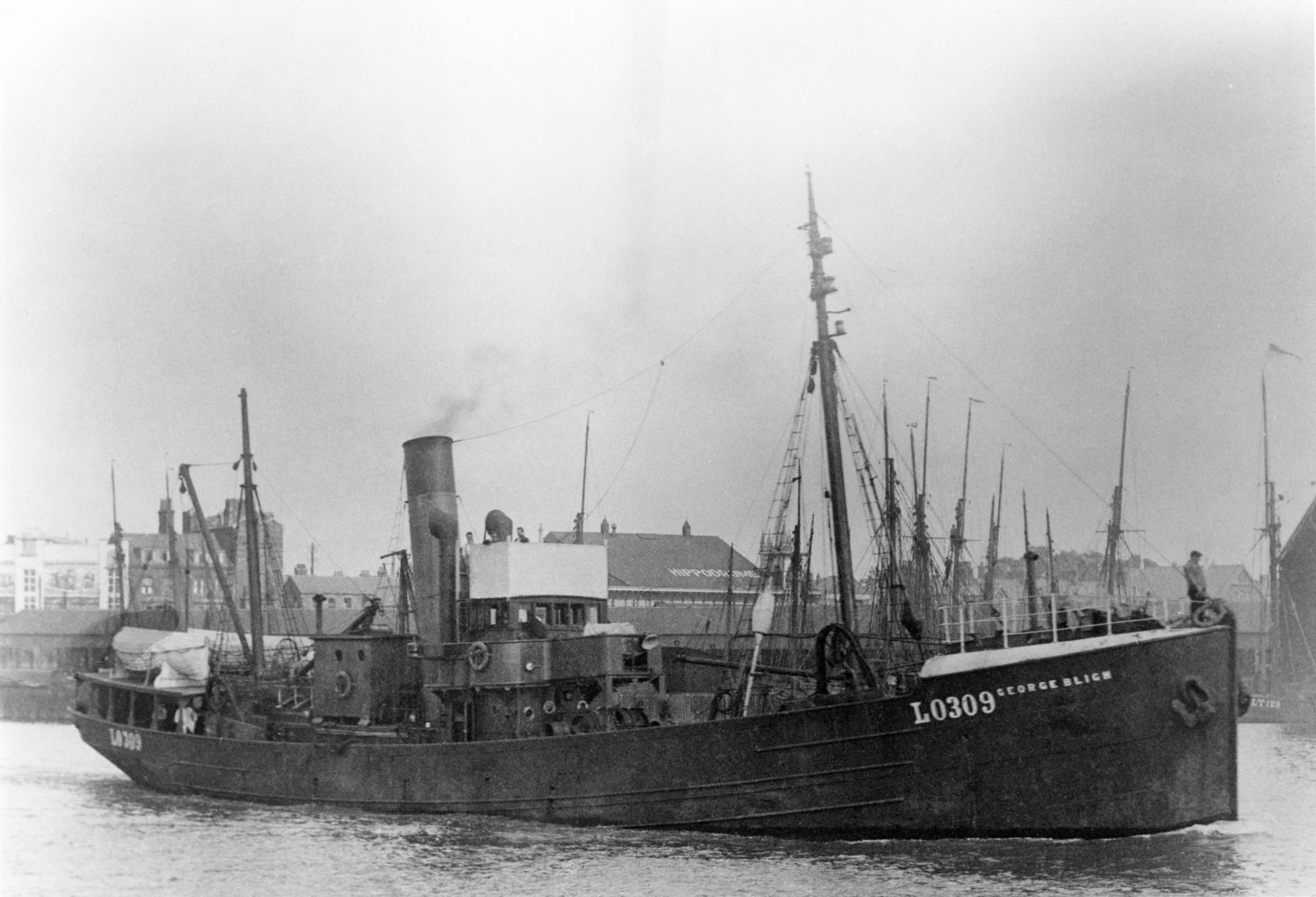
- RV George Bligh

History

United Kingdom
- Name: RV George Bligh
- Owner: Royal Navy; Ministry of Agriculture, Fisheries and Food (United Kingdom); Inch Fishing Co Ltd., Granton Edinburgh
- Builder: Cochrane & Sons Ltd., Selby
- Yard number: Admiralty 2542
- Launched: 24 March 1917
- Commissioned: July 1917
- In service: 3 March 1920
- Renamed: 'Inchkenneth' 1947
- Home port: Lowestoft
- Fate: Scrapped Charlestown, Fife, November 1954

General characteristics
- Class & type: Mersey-type trawler; Minesweeper; Boom Defence Vessel; Research vessel
- Displacement: 324 long tons (329 t)
- Length: 138.5 ft (42.2 m)
- Beam: 23.7 ft 6 in (7.4 m)
- Draught: 12.8 ft 9 in (4.1 m)
- Propulsion: 87 hp T.3-cyl by Campbell Gas Engine Co Ltd, Halifax
- Speed: 11kts
- Complement: 15, up to 18 with wireless
- Armament: 1 × 12-pdr, 1 × 7.5 in BT

RV George Bligh (LO309) was a fisheries research vessel that was operated by the Directorate of Fisheries, now known as the Centre for Environment, Fisheries and Aquaculture Science (Cefas).

Originally built as an Admiralty Mersey-class trawler for use in the First World war

George Bligh was registered in London but based at the port of Lowestoft, on the East Anglian coast.

Like some other the Mersey-class naval trawlers were given names taken from the roll-call of Nelson's ship HMS Victory. George Bligh was named after Captain George Miller Bligh (1780–1834), an officer of the Royal Navy, who saw service during the French Revolutionary and Napoleonic Wars, eventually rising to the rank of captain. He was present aboard HMS Victory at the Battle of Trafalgar, and was badly wounded during the action.

== Construction and World War I ==
The Admiralty trawler George Bligh was constructed by Cochrane & Sons Ltd, Selby (Yorkshire), with Yard Number 802 and Admiralty number 3542. She was launched on 24 March 1917 and completed fitting out during July 1917. She was sold into Mercantile service during 1920, and was purchased by the Ministry of Agriculture, Fisheries and Food (MAFF), London and converted for Fishery Research work. Her draught was found to be too deep for inshore work, so her lifeboat was converted to carry out this work.

A grant of £15,000 was allocated to the Ministry for the purchase of George Bligh, and this was followed by a further grant totalling £10,500 to allow conversion into a research vessel. The Fishery Board for Scotland obtained a similar Admiralty trawler which it renamed FRV Explorer. The Mersey-class John Quilliam became the Danish research vessel Dana II. A fourth Mersey-class trawler, the John W Johnson was renamed Cape Agulhas was operated by the Newfoundland Fisheries Research Station for several months each year from 1931 to 1935. All had the same hull form, but each had a different superstructure, depending on the nature of scientific research for which they were intended.

RV George Bligh was not commissioned into service until April 1921. To allow investigations to proceed before then, Commissioners made available a grant for charter of the trawler SS Joseph & Sarah Miles from the Fishermen's Mission, over the period May 1920 to May 1921.

== Service as a fisheries research vessel ==
RV George Bligh was the primary fisheries survey vessel used by the MAFF throughout the period 1921 to 1939. She was used extensively to assess the status of fish stocks in the North Sea, Irish Sea and English Channel as part of the UK contribution to the International Council for the Exploration of the Sea (ICES)

The maiden voyage of RV George Bligh took place in April 1921. During this period she was tasked with investigating bathymetry and suitability to trawling off northwest Scotland. George Bligh Bank a seamount in the Rockall Trough, was discovered during this survey and is named after the George Bligh.

In July 1921 George Bligh was engaged in extensive studies of the benthos on Dogger Bank, with the aim being to study the bottom living food of commercial fishes.

The need for financial stringency and a lack of fuel, brought about by a miner's strike, made it impossible to run her full time during her early days with the Ministry. Similarly, she was laid up in Lowestoft for five months during 1930 as a requirement for ‘national economy’ during the Great Depression and due to staff shortages. On 10 June 1931 she was re-registered at London.

By the mid 1930s the situation was improving, so much so that, not only did the RV George Bligh return to full-time working in 1935, but the Ministry made the gesture of sending the ship to Iceland in order to preserve continuity of Danish researches there, the Danish research vessel (and sister ship to the George Bligh) having been lost at sea in a collision.

Extensive research was carried out aboard RV George Bligh by C.F. Hickling into hake populations in an area southwest of Ireland. Starting in 1936 a forecast based on the analysis of year-class-strengths was prepared for the Fleetwood fishermen. By 1938 the technique was thought to be reliable.

Alister Hardy, while working for the Lowestoft laboratory studied the planktonic food of North Sea herring (Clupea harengus) aboard RV George Bligh. Hardy proceeded to study the stomach contents of different herring life stages and the associated vertical migrations of the plankton. During this period Hardy developed a ‘plankton indicator’ which could be deployed from a commercial herring drifter (fishing boat). This device used a clockwork mechanism and spool of fine silk mesh. It was to become the forerunner of his Continuous Plankton Recorder (CPR).

== World War II and post-war service ==
In September 1939 RV George Bligh was requisitioned by the Admiralty and converted to a Boom Defence Vessel (Pennant number Z178). The primary function of a Boom Defence Vessel was to lay and maintain steel anti-torpedo or anti-submarine nets. Nets could be laid around an individual ship at anchor, or around harbours or other anchorages.

At around 11 A.M. on the morning of 3 February 1940 HMT George Bligh was attacked by enemy aircraft while operating off Gorleston, near Great Yarmouth. At the time, the primary role of HMT George Bligh, was to check the papers of all vessels, before they entered the harbour.

In January 1942 HMT George Bligh was listed among many similar Boom Defence Vessels allocated to the Scapa Flow Auxiliary Patrol in Orkney.

In December 1945 George Bligh was returned to the MAFF. In 1947 she was sold to Inch Fishing Co Ltd, Granton Edinburgh and renamed Inchkenneth. She was re-registered to Granton as “GN 26”. On 13 November 1954, George Bligh was sold as scrap to the British Iron & Steel Corporation (BISCO) for £2400, and arrived at Charlestown, Fife. She was subsequently scrapped by Shipbreaking Industries Ltd at Charlestown.

== See also ==
- Trawlers of the Royal Navy
- Centre for Environment, Fisheries and Aquaculture Science
