= The Lowestoft Fisherman's and Sailor's Bethel =

The Lowestoft Fisherman's and Sailor's Bethel is a theatre and community hub in Lowestoft, Suffolk. It is owned by The Lowestoft Players Amateur Dramatic Society and now called The Players Theatre, although 'The Bethel' still remains a popular name.

The venue has seating in the multi-purpose auditorium for 200 people seated. Other facilities include 2 smaller rehearsal spaces as well as a foyer bar.

== History ==
=== Foundation ===
A congregation for Sailors and Fishermen had previously been established in the town as early as 1850. The first purpose built 'Bethel' opened in 1863 situated on Commercial Road, before later moving to the larger purpose built building on Battery Green Road in 1899.

=== Construction ===
Construction of The Bethel on Battery Green Road commenced on 21 July 1898 when the foundation stones were laid. The building was designed by local architect Frederick Wilbraham Richards of Stanley Street, Lowestoft. The building work was carried out by Mr. C. R. Cole of Lowestoft. The main chapel room was designed to accommodate 900 Fishermen for worship. The total cost of building was £4,000 which was officially opened on Thursday 23 February 1899.

=== Later years ===
In 2008 the British International Sailors Society announced The Bethel would be sold due to low weekly attendance figures. The final service was one of thanksgiving, and held on 28 September 2008 where 100 people attended.
