= Deutsche Seemannsmission =

International seafarers' welfare organization

The German Seamen's Mission (German: Deutsche Seemannsmission, DSM) is a Protestant organization centered in Germany that provides pastoral and social welfare services to commercial seafarers. It operates seafarers' centers in Germany and internationally, with full-time and voluntary workers. The Mission's offices are in Hamburg.

It is a member of the International Christian Maritime Association. As a Christian organization, it sees its work as the extension of neighborly love to seafarers regardless of religion and culture. The German Seamen's Mission defines its mission as "support of seafarers' dignity" and its goal as the improvement of seafarers' living and working conditions.

In response to COVID-19, the DSM was actively involved in advocating for and providing seafarer vaccinations and shore leave.

== Ports with German Seamen's Mission Presence ==
=== In Germany ===
- Hamburg (the Duckdalben International Seamen's Club)
- Kiel, Schleswig-Holstein
- Cuxhaven, Lower Saxony
- Sassnitz, Mecklenburg-Vorpommern
- Glückstadt, Schleswig-Holstein

=== International ===
- Douala, Cameroon
- Singapore, in partnership with the International Lutheran Seafarers' Mission

== Literature ==
- Reinhard Freese: Geschichte der Deutschen Seemannsmission. Bielefeld 1991. ISBN 978-3-7858-0339-4
- F. M. Harms: Die Geschichte der deutschen evangelischen Seemannsmission. Stettin 1909.
- W. Thun: Werden und Wachsen der Deutschen Evangelischen Seemannsmission. Bremen/Hamburg 1959. (Online)
