= International Christian Maritime Association =

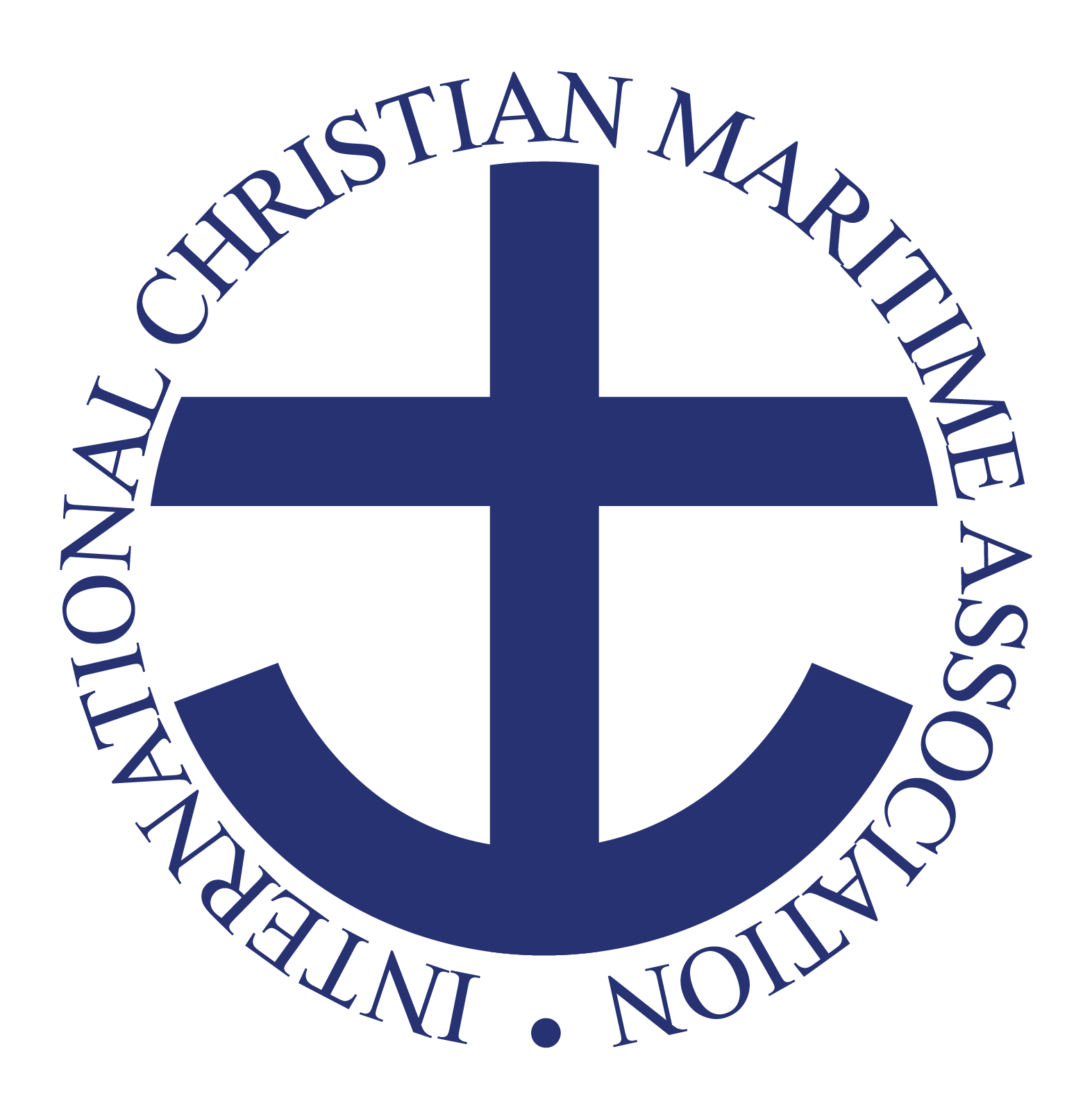

The International Christian Maritime Association (ICMA) is an ecumenical association of 26 Christian organisations, Protestant and Catholic, representing different churches and Christian communities actively engaged in welfare work for people who work at sea, including seafarers, fishers and the families of both. The Association is registered as a charity in the UK and, through its members, operates internationally.

ICMA was founded in 1969, and its first secretary was Daisuke Kitagawa. It seeks to encourage ecumenical collaboration and mutual assistance between its member organisations at international, national and individual port levels.

== Activities ==
The International Christian Maritime Association is a professional association for port chaplaincy. It sets the standards for chaplains' education and training, accrediting courses and soliciting funds for course delivery. It signed an agreement with the North American Maritime Ministry Association (NAMMA) in 2017, 2020, and 2023 to have NAMMA's staff carry on its activities until 2027.

ICMA considers itself an enabling network, strengthening partnerships among members and across denominations to provide a continuum of care for seafarers who move from port to port. This is achieved by regional and global meetings and conferences, a network directory, communication systems and ecumenical relations.

ICMA members employ more than 1,000 port chaplains and many more volunteer personnel. They also maintain more than 400 seafarers' centres and other shore-based welfare facilities and services in many international sea- and river ports. Its members specialise in providing face-to-face frontline pastoral care to seafarers, fishers and families in ports, on board and at home.

The Association's ministry of advocacy for seafarers rights and justice is achieved by participating in the United Nations' International Labour Organization (ILO) and the International Maritime Organization (IMO). ICMA contributed to the formulation and ratification of the Maritime Labour Convention (MLC), 2006. Members of the ICMA network also provides legal advice for chaplains who support seafarers. For example, The Mission to Seafarers has a Justice desk in London and the Seamen's Church Institute of New York and New Jersey (SCI) runs the Center for Mariner Advocacy (CMA) (formerly Center for Seafarers' Rights) from its office in New Orleans.

ICMA collaborates in social partnership with the industry to promote the dignity and welfare of seafarers. ICMA members cooperate locally with unions and representatives of the International Transport Workers' Federation (ITF), shipping companies, agents and governments. ICMA is a member of the International Seafarers' Welfare and Assistance Network.

== Member organisations ==
Member organisations include:

- Association for Seamen's Missions (Japan)
- Biblia Harbour Mission (South Africa)
- Christian Seaman's Organisation (South Africa)
- Danish Seamen's Church and Church Abroad (Danske Sǿmands- og Udlandskirker, Denmark)
- Finnish Seamen's Mission (Suomen Merimieskirkko, Finland)
- Deutsche Seemannsmission (German Seamen's Mission, Germany)
- Sømandsmission (Denmark)
- Korean International Maritime Mission
- LIFE International Seafarers Christian Missions (Romania)
- Mersey Mission to Seafarers/Liverpool Seafarers' Center (Liverpool, England)
- The Naval and Military Bible Society (UK)
- Nederlandse Zeevarenden Centrale (Netherlands)
- North American Maritime Ministry Association (North America)
- Norwegian Church Abroad (Sjømannskirken, Norway)
- PCT Seamen's/Fishermen's Service Centre
- Queen Victoria Seamen's Rest (Methodist, London)
- Royal National Mission to Deep Sea Fishers (UK)
- Sailors' Society (Protestant / Free Church)
- Seamen's Christian Friend Society (United Kingdom)
- Seamen's Church Institute of New York and New Jersey (Episcopalian)
- Seamen's Mission of Estonia
- Seemannsmission der Nordkirche (Germany)
- Stichting Pastoraat Werkers Overzee (Netherlands)
- Stella Maris (Roman Catholic) (formerly the Apostleship of the Sea)
- Sjömannskirken Stockholm Seamen’s Mission (Sweden)
- The Mission to Seafarers (Anglican)
