= Namma =

Namma or NAMMA may refer to

- North American Maritime Ministry Association
- Namma Metro, a rail system in Bengaluru
- Nammu, a Mesopotamian goddess
