= Robert Humphrey Marten =

British entrepreneur (1763–1839)

- Born: 21 March 1763; Whitechapel, London, England
- Died: 11 December 1839 (aged 76); Plaistow, Essex, England

Robert Humphrey Marten (21 March 1763 – 11 December 1839) was a British businessman, religious leader and reformer.

== Career history ==
Marten served as a director of several companies, including becoming a partner in the maritime insurance company Smith St Barbe and Marten, to whose insurance business he added the highly profitable care and disposal of salvaged ships. He was also a director of East London Waterworks Company, founded in 1807, and the Thames Tunnel Company, founded in 1824. He was socially active in the Liberal movement and campaigned against discrimination against people who were not members of the Anglican Church. He co-founded the Non Conformist Church in Plaistow with his neighbour, John Warmington. He was executive secretary of The Committee for the Distribution of Relief to the German Countries Most Distressed by the War, which raised funds to help victims of the Napoleonic Wars and the Post-Napoleonic Depression. Luke Howard acted as joint secretary and led the Quaker relief efforts.

In gratitude for a transfer of £2,500 to the city of Magdeburg and its surroundings, Marten and Howard were awarded honorary citizenship of Magdeburg on 18 October 1815. Marten visited Magdeburg in 1821.

Marten was an honorary member of the Royal Humane Society in 1806 and was the founder and treasurer of the Port of London Society for Promoting the Religious Instruction of British Seamen, founded in 1818 and known generally as the Port of London Society or PLS.

== Personal life ==
Marten was born in Whitechapel, London. His father, Nathaniel, was a pastry cook in Mile End, and his mother was Martha nee Clarkson.

He was married three times: first to Mary Reeves in 1789 but she died the following year; then to Elizabeth Giles in 1791, with whom he had five children, until she died in 1811; and finally to Emma Martin, who ran a school for young ladies, in 1813.

He moved to Plaistow, at that time in Essex, in 1807 due to Elizabeth's failing health. At that time, Broadway House, his new home, was one of the largest in the village of Plaistow and the family had various servants. Marten died in Plaistow in 1839.

Marten was a known friend of politician and anti-slavery campaigner William Wilberforce.

Marten's grandson, also Robert Humphrey Marten, was the first of the family to obtain a degree and became a Baptist minister in Abingdon and, later, in Lee in Kent.
