= North American Maritime Ministry Association =

Seafarers' welfare charity

The North American Maritime Ministry Association (NAMMA) is an ecumenical Christian seafarers’ welfare organization and professional association for seafarers’ welfare workers.

== History ==
=== Founding organizations and early coordination ===
The coordination efforts out of which NAMMA emerged began in the 1890s–1930s, but seafarers' welfare charities were already established in the United States and Canada in the mid-19th century. An early example of ecumenical cooperation was the short-lived 'Boston Society for the Religious and Moral Improvement of Seamen', which had leadership from the Boston Marine Society, the Unitarian Rev. Joseph Tuckermann, and the Catholic Bishop Jean-Louis Lefebvre de Cheverus, but was disbanded shortly after its founding in 1812 when the United States went to war with Britain. Most organizations were either independent or organized by denomination.

==== Early Protestant seafarers' ministries in North America ====
Seafarers' missions were set up by various denominational groups in the 19th century. The Boston Seamen's Friend Society was founded in 1827. The Seaman's Church Institute of New York was founded in lower Manhattan in 1834. Most ports had and affiliated seafarers' mission, Bethel, hotel or church institute by the early years of the 20th century.

==== Early Catholic seafarers' ministries in North America ====
In 1894, a Catholic Reading Room was founded near the Port of New York. In 1910, a tentative list of Catholic seafarers' centers worldwide was compiled under Pius X, mentioning Baltimore, Boston, Montreal, New Orleans, New York, and Philadelphia. The international organization for Catholic seafarers' ministry, Stella Maris (then the Apostleship of the Sea) was founded in 1922, spurred in large part by the advocacy of the Scottish writer Peter Anson. In his 1920 'Plea for Catholic Seamen', Anson wrote:

The greater the activity, the greater the development of all these (in many ways admirable) Protestant missions to seamen described above, the greater the spiritual dangers to which Catholic sailors are exposed.

American priests were later appointed by their bishops to serve as chaplains to their ports, and during the 1934 West Coast waterfront strike the San Francisco port chaplaincy lent its support to the longshoremen's unions.

==== The Conference of Sailors' Workers and International Committee of Christian Workers for Seamen ====
In 1899, the Boston Seamen's Friend Society invited representatives of all Christian ministries to seafarers, including naval chaplains, to a 'Conference of Sailors' Workers' on October 25–27 of that year. At this meeting, attended by 63 delegates from both the United States and Canada, plans were declared to found an ‘International Committee of Christian Workers for Seamen’:

In view of the need of missions for seamen in every port and of the growing importance of legal aid to the rapidly increasing body of men in American ships, it seems to your committee desirable that a central committee be appointed to promote and strengthen missions on this continent and among the islands in which we are now interested. We therefore recommend that this conference should appoint a chairman, a vice chairman and a secretary of a central committee, to be known as the International Committee of Christian Workers for Seamen, [...] and that among the duties of this central committee shall be that of promoting new organizations and obtaining reports and distributing helpful information among the friends of seamen [...]

Such an organization was founded, with Archibald Mansfield of the Seamen's Church Institute of New York and New Jersey as secretary.

==== The National Conference of Social Work ====
Originally founded in 1873 as the National Conference of Charities and Correction, the National Conference of Social Work was an annual conference with a reputation for focusing on practice-based education and being open to diverse and controversial schools of thought. It was also known as a place where charities with a shared special interest could find each other and create organizations of their own. In the years after World War I and during the Great Depression, the conference was particularly occupied with employment and social security. Its 1932 meeting had more than 4,000 registrants and, while still ideologically diverse and often contested, was perceived

[...] to express a tendency away from the Jeffersonian ideal that "that Government is best which governs the least." The Conference seems to have fallen in line with hundreds of other groups who would like to see the Government extend its activities into fields not originally contemplated-fields which logically are local and "within the care of the people."

=== Foundation ===
The first gatherings in direct historical continuity with NAMMA were the meetings of an unincorporated, ecumenically Protestant ‘National Group of Seamen's Agencies' (NGSA), first in Philadelphia in 1932, alongside the National Conference of Social Work. In 1938, the NGSA had offices established in New York "for correlating and standardizing the work of seamen's agencies across the country". It was formally incorporated as the 'National Council of Seamens' Agencies' (NCOSA), in 1951.

=== Ongoing history ===
An ICOSA observer attended the 15th World Conference of the Apostleship of the Sea in 1972.

In 1976, ICOSA was described as a 'very loose organization of about forty-five dues-paying members', and that it was getting funding from United Presbyterian Church and a number of seafarers' welfare organizations to establish a paid secretariat and sponsor education and standardization among its members.

==== Name changes ====
Having formally begun as the 'National Group of Seamen's Agencies' (NGSA) in 1932, the organization changed its name a number of times to reflect different emphases in purpose and geography.

- In 1940, it became the 'National Association of Seamen's Welfare Agencies, United States and Canada'
- In 1943, the 'Council of Seamen's Agencies' (COSA)
- In 1951, the 'National Council of Seamen's Agencies' (NCOSA)
- In 1967, the 'International Council of Seamen's Agencies' (ICOSA), though in 1976 it was noted that 'it is not as international as the title implies'.
- In 1992, the 'North American Maritime Ministry Association' (NAMMA)

== Activities ==
NAMMA's activities have generally focussed on promoting seafarers’ welfare and Christian ministry in the shipping industry, promoting ecumenism and professional development in Christian seafarers’ ministries, and coordinating networking and collective efforts among its members.

=== Advocacy ===
NAMMA's advocacy in the shipping industry has often taken the form of a Christian Social Gospel, calling for seafarers’ welfare as a moral and economic obligation and treating involvement in seafarers’ welfare as a form of Christian mission. It supports seafarers’ access to amenities like shore leave, health care, and internet, supports closer enforcement of existing seafarers’ rights legislation, and promotes collective approaches to seafarers’ welfare in the maritime industry, especially through the creation of seafarers’ welfare boards.

NAMMA is a founding member of the Canadian National Seafarers’ Welfare Board. It was a signatory of the Neptune Declaration on Seafarer Wellbeing and Crew Change. Through its connections with ICMA and the Center for Mariner Advocacy of the Seamen's Church Institute, it has also been involved as an observer in negotiations surrounding the Maritime Labour Convention, 2006.

=== Coordination ===
NAMMA is credited with building personal and institutional relationships between seafarers' welfare organizations, which tend in North America to be geographically and theologically distant from each other. NAMMA's conferences, having been held yearly since the 1900s, are where the majority of conversations and deliberations among its members take place and members are elected to the board of directors. The conferences’ content centers around comparing approaches and issues in seafarers’ welfare, with regular guest speakers from the US Coast Guard, various chambers of shipping, and the International Transport Workers' Federation.

In its capacity as a professional association, NAMMA has acted as a collective spokesgroup for Christian seafarers' welfare organizations to provide information on their work to the industry and general public, as well as researchers and governments. It has also independently surveyed and reported to seafarers' welfare organizations about trends in their own work. During the pandemic period of COVID-19, NAMMA and ICMA collected information on seafarer vaccinations from port to port, by its members and others, and made that information available to the shipping industry through the International Maritime Organization.

=== Education and publishing ===
A large portion of the educational resources used by seafarers' welfare organizations, including outside of North America, are produced through NAMMA. A yearly training school for seafarers’ chaplains and other welfare workers in Houston is taught and operated by NAMMA. NAMMA is also involved in the creation of online professional development resources for seafarers’ welfare, with the Merchant Navy Welfare Board in creating an introductory course for ship visitors, and through its own platform.

Books and articles written about seafarers’ welfare have also been published through NAMMA. It releases the MARE Report annually featuring articles written by seafarers’ welfare workers, has published books by its members on the history of seafarers’ welfare, and oversees the International Association for the Study of Maritime Mission, which archives and tracks publications on seafarers’ welfare.

== Membership and affiliations ==
Seafarers’ welfare organizations in the United States, Canada, Bermuda and the Caribbean, including ministries of the Mission to Seafarers, the Seamen's Church Institute, Stella Maris, and of other evangelical and mainline Protestant organizations constitute the membership of NAMMA, making it the Christian seafarers’ welfare association with the widest membership in North America.

Its role as an ecumenical association is particularly significant, as North America has no ‘national churches’ with centralized national seafarers’ ministries like the German or Norwegian seamens’ churches, and a significant motivating factor in the development of Catholic seafarers' ministries in North America was the perception that the dominantly Protestant ministries were underserving Catholic international seafarers. In this context, NAMMA is credited with fostering a symbolic community of maritime ministries through institutional connections.

NAMMA is also a founding member of the International Christian Maritime Association. In 2017, ICMA and NAMMA also signed a partnership agreement according to which NAMMA's staff conducts ICMA's activity, and that agreement was renewed in 2023 to last until 2027.

NAMMA also has worked with other organizations involved in seafarers’ welfare, including the IMO, the ITF Seafarers' Trust, the US Coast Guard, the UK Merchant Navy Welfare Board, and maritime governments and chambers of shipping.

== Archival sources ==
NAMMA's secretariat has not been centralized throughout its history and archival material is spread among a number of locations. Archival material on the history of the organization is found in records at Mystic Seaport, Independence Seaport Museum, The Center for Migration Studies of New York, and the archives of the Seamen's Church Institute of New York and New Jersey found at Queens College, City University of New York. Additional records are found with those of the International Christian Maritime Association at the archives of the Hull History Centre in Kingston upon Hull, UK and the World Council of Churches in Geneva.
