= Archibald Mansfield =

New York clergyman

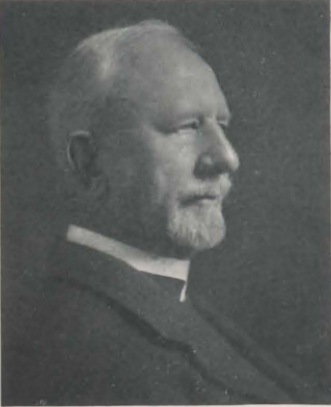
Archibald Mansfield

Archibald Romaine Mansfield (January 3, 1871 - February 11, 1934) was an American clergyman.

== Early life ==
He was born in Spring Valley, New York, on January 3, 1871, to clergyman Romaine Stiles Mansfield (1843–1916) and Amelia (née Moore) Mansfield (1837–1914). He attended St. John's School in Ossining, graduating in 1888, and graduated from St. Stephen's in Annandale with a bachelor's degree in 1892, and from seminary in 1896. He became a deacon in 1896 and an Episcopal priest in 1897.

== Career ==
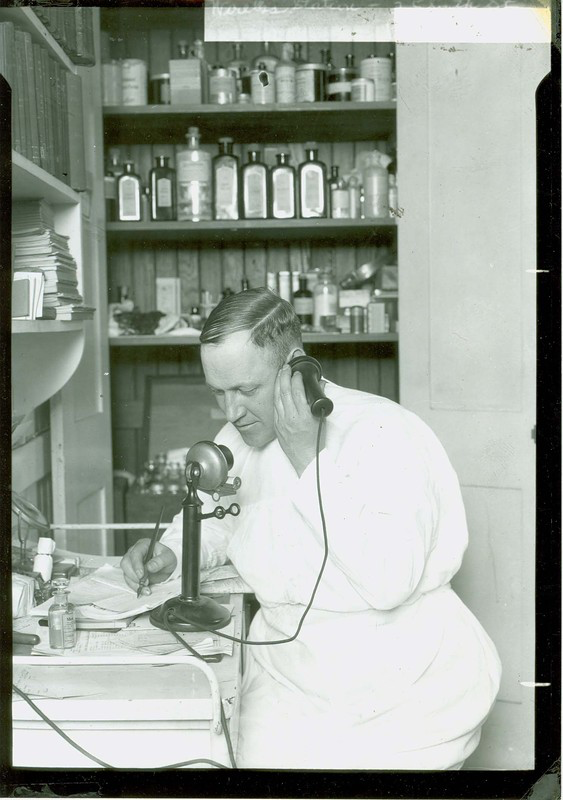
MEDICO radio station in use at the Seamans' Church Institute in New York

In 1895 he was persuaded by Benoni Lockwood, one of the managers of a seamen's mission in Sailortown in New York, to become a chaplain for Lockwood's mission.

Along with Edmund Lincoln Baylies, he helped establish the Seaman's Church Institute at 25 South Street in New York. He created MEDICO, a service for providing medical advice to ships by radio. He served as the first Superintendent of the Institute.

== Personal life ==
Mansfield married Ella Louise Huntington (1875–1952) in 1899 and they had three sons and two daughters.

He died of a heart attack at his home in Manhattan on February 11, 1934. Two years after his death, his widow served as chairman of the Central Council of Associations of the Seamen's Church Institute, succeeding Mrs. H. Schuyler Cammann.

=== Legacy ===
Following his death, a campaign for $100,000 was established to create a permanent memorial to Rev. Mansfield, in honor of his thirty-eight years with the Institute. The campaign was sponsored by a special committee headed by Rear Admiral Reginald R. Belknap.

The SS Archibald R. Mansfield Liberty ship, built in 1944 by the New England Shipbuilding Corporation, was named for Mansfield.
