= SS Joseph & Sarah Miles =

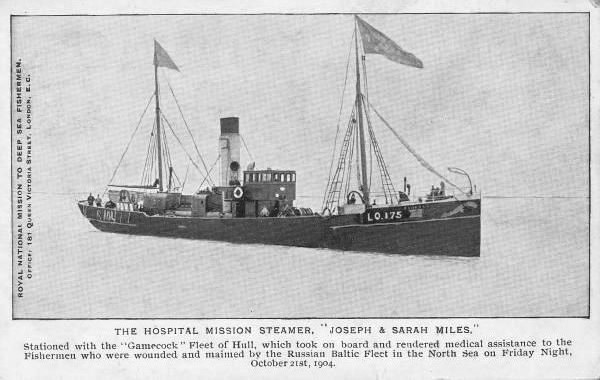
- Mission ship Joseph & Sarah Miles (postcard)

History

United Kingdom
- Name: Joseph & Sarah Miles
- Owner: Fishermen's Mission
- Operator: Fishermen's Mission; Royal Navy; Ministry of Agriculture, Fisheries and Food (United Kingdom)
- Builder: Hawthorns & Co., Leith, – at the Sheriff Brae yard
- Launched: 18 September 1902
- Commissioned: November 1902
- Decommissioned: 1930
- In service: 1902-1930
- Home port: London
- Identification: Admiralty number 1132, IMO 115923
- Fate: unknown

General characteristics
- Type: Fishery Mission ship; Hospital ship; Minesweeper; Research Vessel
- Tonnage: 272 long tons (276 t)
- Displacement: 85 long tons (86 t)
- Length: 135 ft (41.1 m)
- Beam: 22.5 ft (6.9 m)
- Draught: 13.8 ft (4.2 m)
- Propulsion: T3cyl (13, 21, 34 x 24in), 65nhp, 1 screw
- Armament: QF 12-pounder 12 cwt naval gun

SS Joseph & Sarah Miles (LO175) was a ‘mission ship’, constructed for the Royal National Mission to Deep Sea Fishermen (Fishermen's Mission) and operated from 1902 until 1930. She acted as a hospital ship during the Dogger Bank incident (also known as the Russian Outrage) on the night of 21/22 October 1904, when the Russian Baltic Fleet mistook a British trawler fleet for the Imperial Japanese Navy and fired on them in the North Sea.

Joseph & Sarah Miles was briefly employed as a fisheries research vessel that was operated by the Ministry of Agriculture, Fisheries and Food (United Kingdom) - Directorate of Fisheries, now known as the Centre for Environment, Fisheries and Aquaculture Science (Cefas) between 1920 and 1922. During this time, she participated in 49 survey campaigns, mostly focused on North Sea herring and plaice.

== Construction ==
Joseph & Sarah Miles was constructed by Hawthorns & Co., Leith, Scotland – at the Sheriff Brae yard. She was launched on 18 September 1902, and completed fitting out as a ‘Mission ship’ (although very similar to a conventional trawler) in November 1902.

The purpose of a ‘mission ship’ was to provide pastoral and spiritual support for fishermen at sea. The first Mission Ship to be commissioned was Alpha in 1900, followed by Joseph & Sarah Miles, and Queen Alexandra in 1902. As well as being hospital ships, they were all equipped with fishing-gear and sent their fish to market with the rest of the fleet.

The great difference between a Mission ship and an ordinary trawler, in connection with fishing, was that Mission ships did not fish on Sundays, whereas very many of the ordinary steam-trawlers did. As a hospital ship Joseph & Sarah Miles carried a surgeon and surgeon's mate, along with a crew capable of turning their hands to nursing. A complete surgical outfit of instruments was available, including the ability to take X-rays. The hospital contained two swing cots and four berths for patients.

Wood (1911) argued that "A Mission ship is one of the most interesting vessels afloat. She is a cruising hospital, a place of worship, a tobacco shop, a clothing establishment, a free library, a club-room, an hotel, and a recreation ground. If a smacksman is sick or injured, he will be fetched on board and receive skilled attention until he is better; if he wants to attend service and hoists a signal to indicate his wish, the Mission boat will call for him".

== The Dogger Bank Incident ==
The Dogger Bank incident occurred on the night of 21/22 October 1904, when the Russian Baltic Fleet mistook a British trawler fleet from Kingston upon Hull in the Dogger Bank area of the North Sea for an Imperial Japanese Navy force and fired on them. Three British fishermen died and a number were wounded. One sailor and a priest aboard the Russian cruiser Aurora caught in the crossfire were also killed. The incident almost led to war between Britain and Russia.

The Russian warships illuminated the trawlers with their searchlights and opened fire. The British trawler Crane was sunk, and its captain and first mate were killed. Four other trawlers were damaged, and six other fishermen were wounded, one of whom died a few months later. As the trawlers had their nets down, they were unable to flee and, in the general chaos, Russian ships shot at each other.

The Mission surgeon, Dr Anklesaria, who was on board Joseph & Sarah Miles, looked after the wounded from the trawler Crane and gave the following account:

"I have never witnessed such a gory sight. Two men lay on deck with their heads nearly blown to pieces. In the cabin the scene was more heartrending still. when I saw six men stretched about anyhow, bleeding and groaning with the agony of their wounds. Under the circumstances, I had them all removed on board our ship. With all these wounded men on board, our floating hospital looked like a veritable sight. It kept me busy with knife and needle the whole of that day, and it was not until late in the night that I had the satisfaction of seeing them all safe and snug in their cots, as far as circumstances allowed".

== World War I and post-war service ==
At the outbreak of war in 1914, Joseph & Sarah Miles was requisitioned by the Admiralty, allocated pennant number 1132 and armed with a single 12 pounder naval gun. She served as a minesweeper throughout the hostilities until 15 April 1920, operating mainly out of Fleetwood.

In May 1920, the Fisheries Commissioners for England made available a grant for the charter of Joseph & Sarah Miles from the Fishermen's Mission, in order to restart fishery investigations, ahead of the RV George Bligh coming into service in April 1921. Between May 1920 and December 1922, the SS Joseph and Sarah Miles participated in 49 separate research cruises, primarily focused on herring - egg and larval surveys, plaice egg surveys, plaice tagging but also the study of benthic organisms on the Dogger Bank.

Following return to her owners, Joseph & Sarah Miles continued in service with the Fishermen's Mission until 1930.

The British Film Institute (BFI) holds a 1925 documentary film titled "Heroes of the North Sea" (directed by A.E. Jones, cameraman - Frank Grainger) that sets out to illustrate the dangers of fleet fishing. This documentary was filmed aboard the Mission ship Joseph & Sarah Miles and shows the 'Gamecock' fleet of nearly fifty North Sea trawlers. Scenes on board the mission ship precede shots of the men at work, dropping the nets, and hauling in the catch, as well as views of fish being loaded onto a transport ship for dispatch to Billingsgate Fish Market in London.

== See also ==
- Centre for Environment, Fisheries and Aquaculture Science
- Fishermen's Mission
- Dogger Bank incident
