= Boston Seaman's Friend Society =

U.S. non-profit organization

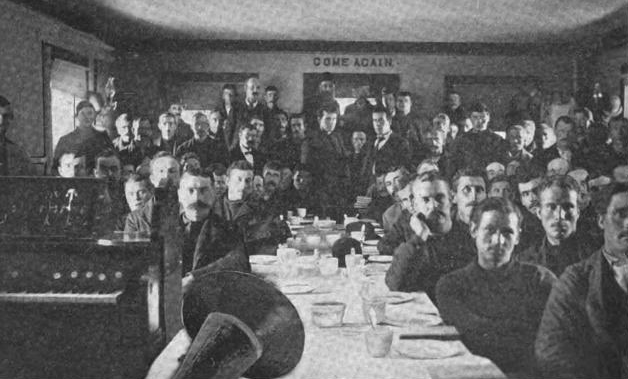
Survivors of 1898 shipwreck. Seamen's Chapel, Vineyard Haven, Massachusetts; a project of the Boston Seaman's Friend Society

The Boston Seaman's Friend Society (est. 1827) or Seafarer's Friend is a charitable religious organization based in Boston, Massachusetts. It aims to improve the welfare of mariners.

== History ==
=== 19th century ===
"Lyman Beecher and a group of congregational ministers organized" the society in c. 1828. "They appealed to the public for funds and interested a number of prominent shipowners in the welfare of the sailors." The Boston Seaman's Friend Society incorporated in 1829.

The society oversaw the Mariner's Church (built 1830) and the Sailor's Home on Purchase Street, Boston, the latter located in the former home of shipping merchant Lott Wheelwright (1836–1845), and replaced by a new building in 1845. "The building presents a front on Purchase street of sixty-two feet in length, and thirty-five feet on Gibbs' Lane, now Belmont Street, with an L extending in the rear of about thirty feet. It is four stories high, with a basement and attic, presenting an elevation from the street of about seventy feet. The basement and first story are of hewn granite. On the top of the building is an observatory, mounted with a flag-staff, which commands the whole view of the harbor. The rooms and apartments of the house are admirably arranged. It contains, among other rooms, seventy-two dormitories for the use of the boarders, and a large and spacious reading-room, which is furnished with a library, the newspapers, and periodicals of the day." In 1841: "the Mariner's Church has now about 150 members, more than half of them males, two-thirds of whom were once living in all the wretchedness and vice of drunken sailors. The Sailor's Home received the last year 873 boarders."

In Boston the society also ran the Seaman's Chapel on Hanover Street (c. 1880s). In 1887, "the chapel and reading-room of the Boston Seaman's Friend Society is at 175 Hanover street. They have a large, well ventilated hall, which will accommodate about 350 persons. The society has a chaplain, Capt. S.S. Nickerson, who has been a 'deep-water' sailor for twenty-four years. ... He is assisted by three missionaries." In 1899, the Society called a Conference of Sailors' Workers to form a committee "to promote and strengthen missions on this continent and among the islands in which we are now interested", 32 years before the first formal meetings of the North American Maritime Ministry Association (NAMMA).

On Martha's Vineyard the society oversaw the Seaman's Chapel, Vineyard Haven (c. 1900).

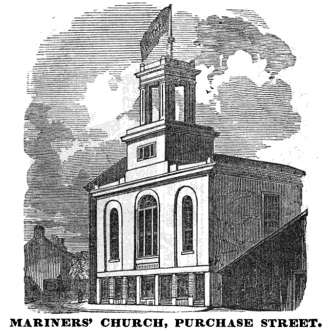
Mariner's Church, Purchase Street, Boston; built 1830

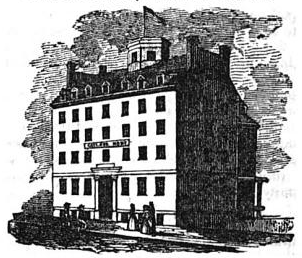
Sailor's Home, Purchase Street, Boston, 19th century

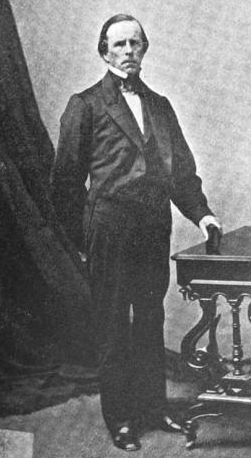
Elijah Kellogg, Mariner's Church pastor 1854 – c. 1865

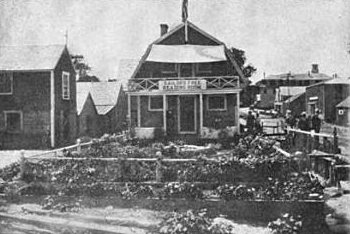
Seamen's Chapel, Martha's Vineyard, c. 1900

Officers and staff of the society have included George W. Bourne (pastor c. 1850s), Jonathan Greenleaf (pastor 1830–1833), Alpheus Hardy, Elijah Kellogg (pastor 1854 – c. 1865), Daniel M. Lord (minister 1834–1848). Anniversary events commemorated the society's activities through the years, held for example at Park Street Church (1842), Tremont Temple (1850–1851, 1855, 1862), and Boston Music Hall (1853, 1856).

The Boston Seaman's Friend Society was described in 1900: "Its ministry is to the 3,000,000 sailors of the world, and in particular to the 160,000 who annually visit Boston, and the 50,000 who yearly make harbor at Vineyard Haven. Its chapels and reading-rooms are open to sailors of all nations every day in the week. Its chaplains and missionaries supply relief to destitute seamen, comfort the sick in hospitals, and bury the dead. They give social entertainments to men in port, and good reading matter to those going to sea."

=== 21st century ===
As of 1999, "the society is now known as 'Seafarer's Friend' and its geographical reach extends to ships arriving in Portland, Maine, and Portsmouth, N.H., as well as Boston." While Seafarer's Friend has historic ties to the United Church of Christ, it is now an independent, non-denominational ministry.

== See also ==
- Boston Seaman's Aid Society
