= John Ashley (priest) =

John Ashley was an Anglican priest.

In 1835 he was on the shore at Clevedon with his son who asked him how the people on Flat Holm could go to church. For the next three months Ashley voluntarily ministered to the population of the island. From there he recognised the needs of the seafarers on the four hundred sailing vessels in the Bristol Channel and created the Bristol Channel Mission. He raised funds and in 1839 a specially designed mission cutter was built with a main cabin which could be converted into a chapel for 100 people.

This became the Missions to Seamen which in 2000 changed its name to the Mission to Seafarers.
