= Sir Gabriel Wood's Mariners' Asylum =

Facility in Greenock, Scotland

Coordinates: 55°57′33″N 4°47′14″W

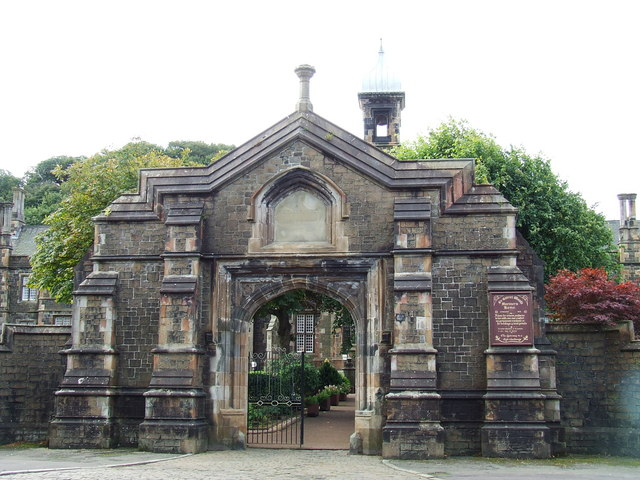
Sir Gabriel Woods Mariner's Home - geograph.org.uk - 559683

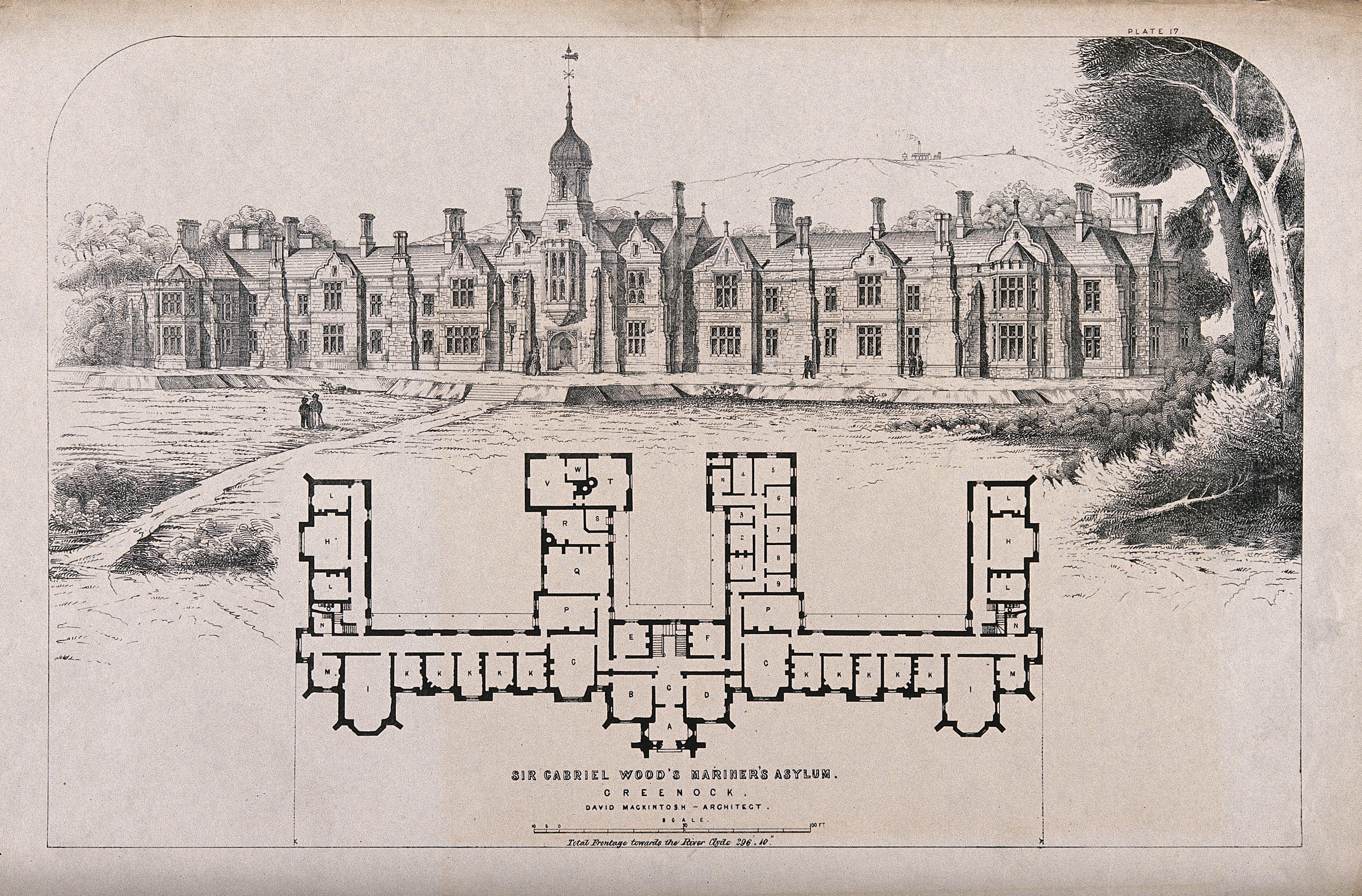
Sir Gabriel Wood's Mariner's Asylum, Grennock, Renfrew, Scot Wellcome V0012713

Sir Gabriel Wood's Mariners' Asylum is a facility in Greenock, Scotland, which opened 17 October. 1854. It was built to house and care for aged and impoverished seamen belonging to the counties of Renfrewshire (historic), Ayrshire, Dunbartonshire, Argyll, and County of Bute. Its founder, Sir Gabriel Wood (1767–1845), served as Vice-Consul for the state of Maryland and later as Commissary-General of Accounts for the Caribbean, then of the Mediterranean, and finally of Canada. He bequeathed his entire estate to his wife Louisa Augusta and his sister Francis Ann Wood. A memorandum instructed them to establish a home providing for the care of local destitute seamen. Sir Gabriel Wood's Mariners' Asylum was included in the 1861 United Kingdom census. At that time, there were forty-five former mariners and seamen residing there with ages ranging from 58 to 84 years old. The staff included the Governor of the Institution, Adam MacKay, a matron, a housekeeper, a laundress, and two servants. In November 2020, inspections by Care Inspectorate (Scotland) identified several deficiencies in the care being provided. The Trustees of the Sailors' Society who owned the facility decided to close the home. As reasons, they cited increased pressures resulting from the COVID-19 pandemic, and lack of resources to uphold the standards they set for the home. In March 2022, the property was sold to Torah Capital Limited, a London company.
