= Daisuke Kitagawa =

Japanese-American reverend and activist

Daisuke Kitagawa (1910–1970) was a reverend and episcopal priest who was a leader in racial justice and social justice movements.

== Biography ==
On October 23, 1910, Kitagawa was born in Taihoku City, Japan which is currently known as Taipei, Taiwan.

In 1928 he went to one of Japan's leading schools of theology, St. Paul/Rikkyo university. One of his biggest mentors was the bishop of Kyoto, Shirley H. Nichols. He graduated in 1933 and proceeded to emigrate to the United States in 1937 and attended General Theological Seminary. He received the degree in 1940. He focused on his Episcopal studies and occasionally connected with the Japanese communities of New York city.

Kitagawa's ministry started in 1938 at St. Peters mission in Seattle. This was followed by him receiving his first assignment as a resident minister of the St. Paul's Church in Kent, Washington. He was a minister of the Japanese communities of the White River Valley, and built up his parish among the Buddhist majority.

=== Incarceration ===
On May 4, 1942, the reverend was sent to Pinedale detention center near Fresno, California. While here, he continued to lead ministry services for the Christians. In September 1942, the army shut down the detention center and sent the inmates to the Tule Lake concentration camp. Receiving threats for wanting fair treatment, Kitagawa grew tired and sought permanent reassignment, which was granted on October 31, 1943.

In these camps, he observed the camps "devastating" impact on the young Japanese, which created his lasting belief in the universal Church's agency in a vital gospel ministry of social and cultural healing. He was involved in analyzing racial issues around the world with black, white, and Asian races.

=== Minneapolis ===
Kitagawa went on to be named the Minister of a Japanese Christian Church in Minneapolis, MN. He rose to be an emerging leader in resettling Japanese Americans to the twin cities area. He spoke to local churches, schools, and community organizations in the area. He also took part in the St. Paul resettlement committee to open hostels for Japanese American Newcomers. In the postwar years, Kitagawa remained in Minneapolis to be an active voice in local affairs and an expert on race relations. Kitagawa even worked with the state government, authoring a report for Minnesota Governor Luther Youngdahl's Interracial Commission on Japanese American Resettlement in Minnesota.

=== Citizenship granted ===
On February 10, 1951, Senator Walter Judd of Minnesota made a private bill that would allow Kitagawa to become a U.S. citizen, despite ongoing restrictions against the naturalization of Japanese nationals.

=== Doctorate degree ===
In January 1952, the reverend enrolled in University of Chicago Divinity School as a doctorate student. He returned in August 1952 to Minneapolis to continue his work, but eventually returned to Chicago in 1954 and completed his doctorate degree in the same year.

=== World Council of Churches ===
Kitagawa served a number of roles in the World Council of Churches from 1956 onwards, including as Secretary of Racial and Ethnic Relations (1960-1962) and Secretary for Urban and Industrial Mission Program in the Division of World Mission and Evangelism (1968-his death in 1970).

==== International Christian Maritime Association ====
Kitagawa represented the WCC in the formation of the International Christian Maritime Association, promoting ecumenism and cooperation among Christian seafarers' ministries. He was actively involved in recruiting new members, and the steering and working committees that led to the organization's formation. He served as the secretary and treasurer from its foundation in 1969 until his unexpected death in 1970, but was unable to attend the first official conference in 1969 due to his failing health. While Kitagawa had not himself been directly involved in ministry to seafarers prior to his work founding ICMA, historian of maritime missiology Paul Mooney describes him as an insightful commenter on seafarers and their lives. He is quoted as supporting the provision of communication services to seafarers by their employers or governments, saying

"economically and technologically we are all one world. The existing structure of the international community needs to adjust to this reality. [As] President Nixon talked to a man on the moon, there is no reason why a man on board a ship could not be in touch with his family.”

== Works ==
- Race Relations and Christian Mission (1964)
- The Pastor and the Race Issue (1965)
- Issei and Nisei: The internment years (1967)
- “Faith And Society”, in Lambeth Essays on Faith (1969)

== Death ==
He died on March 27, 1970, at the age of 59. Shocking many, his death was caused by an unexpected heart attack in Geneva, Switzerland. His body was brought back to be interred in Hackensack, New Jersey. He was survived by his son and wife, and his son John also became an episcopal priest.
