= Duckdalben International Seamen's Club =

Seamen's club in Hamburg, Germany

Coordinates: 53.520449°N 9.92147°E

Duckdalben – International Seamen's Club is the name of the seamen's club founded in 1986 in the Port of Hamburg by the Deutsche Seemannsmission Hamburg-Harburg e. V. Every year, around 35,000 seafarers from more than 100 countries are offered practical help and orientation in what is for them a foreign port. Duckdalben is named after the mooring pilings called Dalben (Engl.: dolphins). In 2011 it was named the world's best seamen's club.

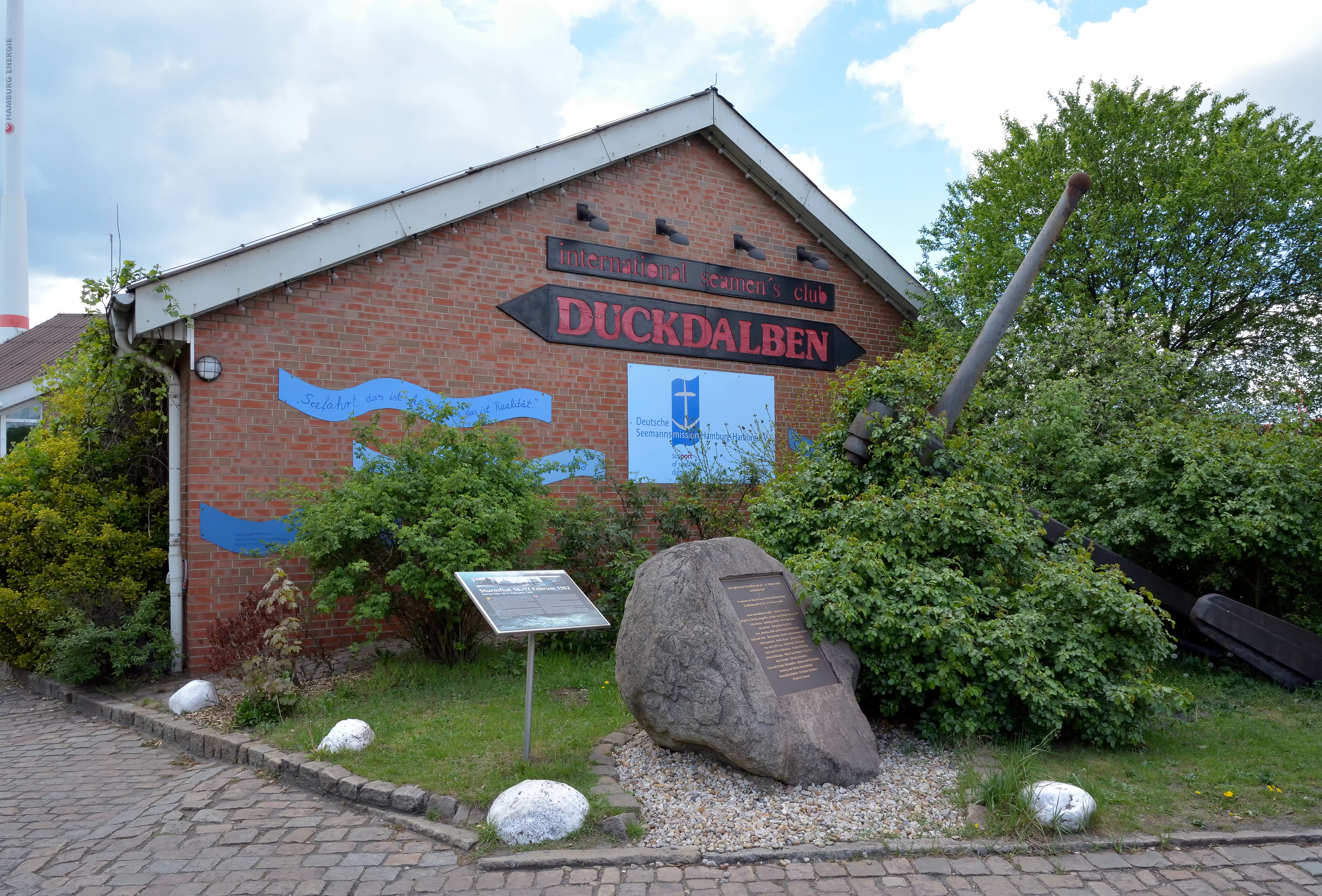
Duckdalben Seamen's Club in the Port of Hamburg operated by the Deutsche Seemannsmission Hamburg-Harburg e.V.

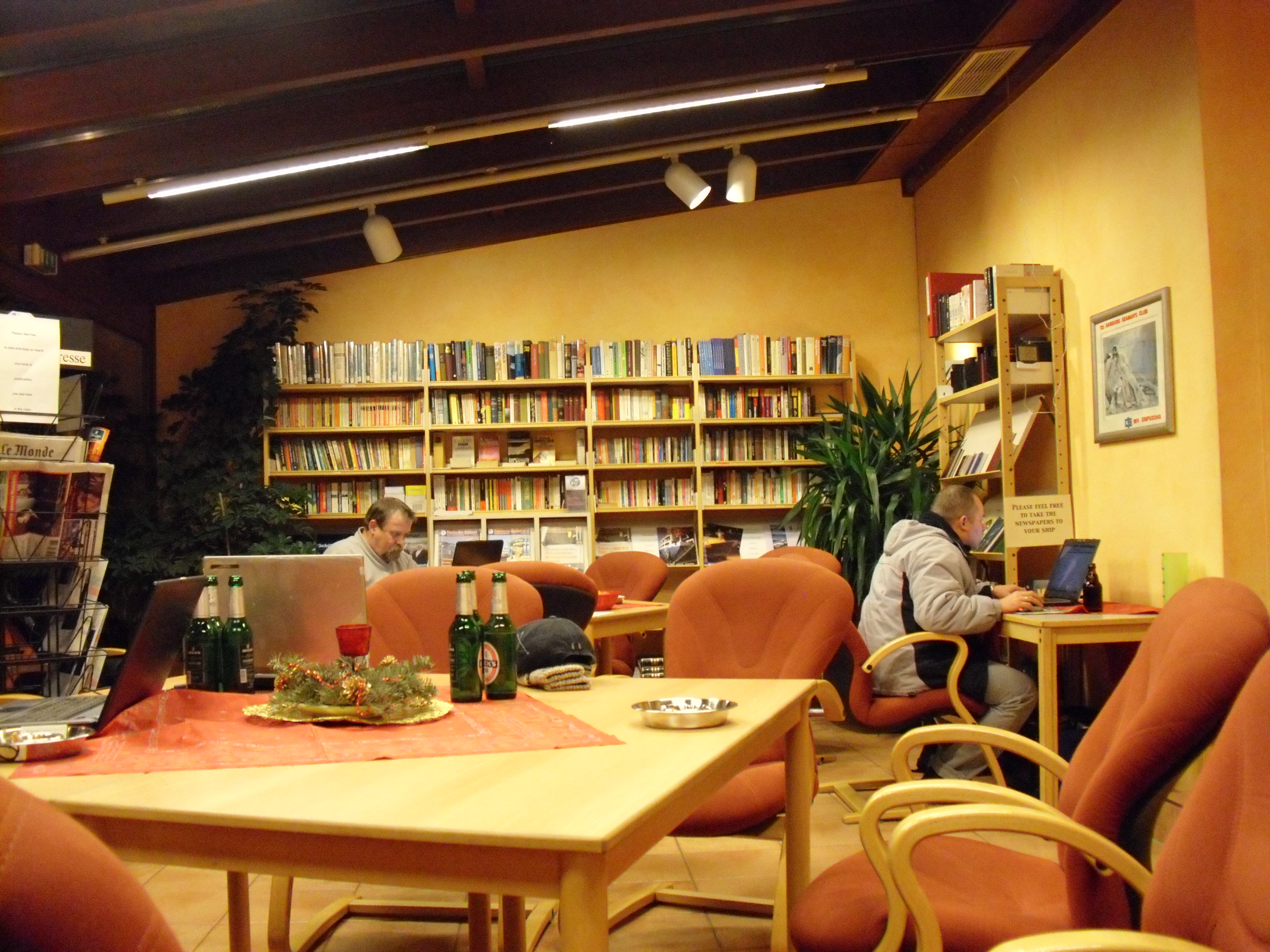
Port of Hamburg, cosy library in the Duckdalben Seamen's Club

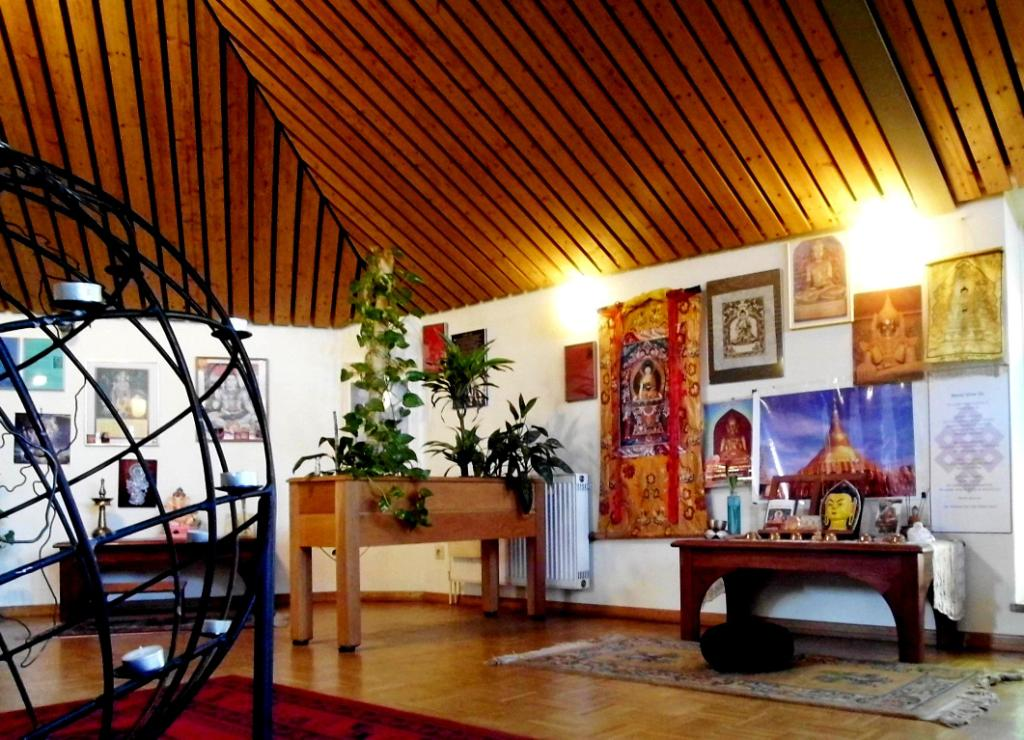
"Room of Silence" chapel for seamen of different religions

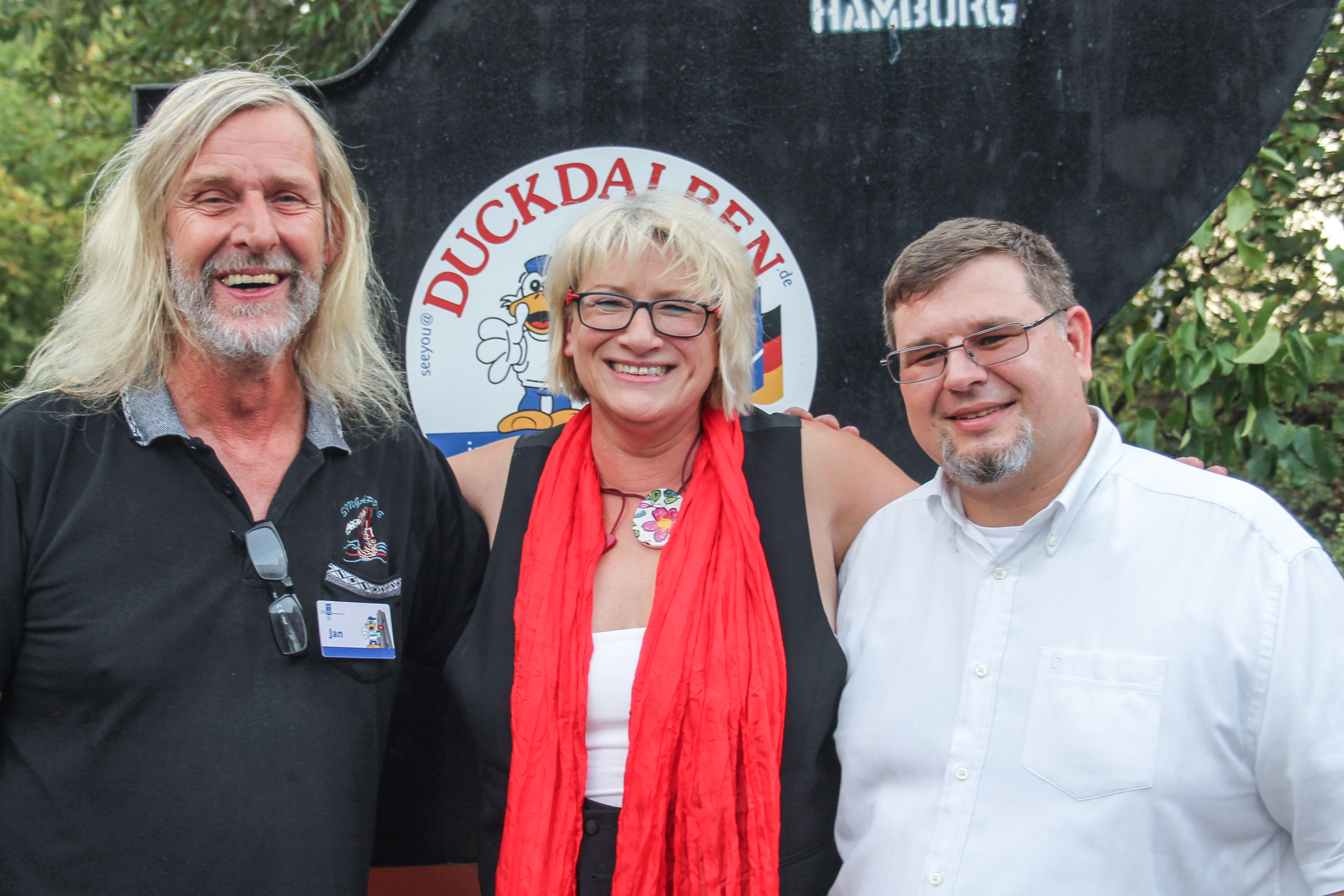
Duckdalben Seamen's Club directors Anke Wibel and Jan Oltmanns, with Jörn Hille, director of ship visiting in the Port of Hamburg

== History ==
The first seamen's home in Germany was founded in Bremen; the first seamen's mission in Germany was established in 1891 in Hamburg. The Duckdalben seamen's club opened as a facility of the Seemannsmission Harburg on 13 August 1986 on the Zellmannstrasse located beneath the Köhlbrand Bridge in the Duty Free Port (Waltershof). The name is derived from the groups of thick tree trunks that are rammed in the harbour floor for mooring vessels.

In 1986, it all started with a maintenance shed belonging to the port railway. It was later used as an office by the forerunner of today's Port Authority, and finally chosen as the site for establishing a seamen's club in the growing container port in Waltershof. The shed was given a brick façade and originally designed to accommodate 15 to 20 visitors. However, the up to 120 seafarers who visited the facility daily soon showed that this first version was much too small. Relief came in 1994 with plans to add a major expansion that included rainwater collection and solar warm water systems, and which was made possible through the generous financial support of the International Transport Workers' Federation ITF. In addition to a spacious, friendly entry hall with telephone booths for undisturbed telephoning, a billiard room and multi-purpose hall were also included. These can be used as table tennis room, meeting room or for celebrations. A non-denominational "Room of Silence" chapel was set up in the upper floor. The expansion was finished in 1995.

In 2003 a conservatory with fireplace was added, which also functions as a library offering several foreign newspapers in addition to books. An annexe was completed in 2015 that serves as office space; this was the third time that the International Seamen's Club building has been enlarged.

== Duckdalben ==
In the upper floor of the main building is the "Room of Silence" chapel that was designed with worship and prayer niches for seafarers with varying religions and denominations. Books and newspapers are available in the club's library. In the club room seamen can eat and drink at moderate prices. They can also telephone with friends and family at especially favourable rates and carry out simple bank, post and currency exchange transactions. There is a small shop, and tourist information about Hamburg is also given out. Warm clothing from the club's clothing store is available the entire year. Much of the clothing donations is provided by the Hamburg welfare organisation Hanseatic Help.

Billiard and table tennis, table football and darts are available for the seamen's recreation. A small sports field invites seafarers to pursue sports activities – which is normally not possible on board their ships. Computers with Internet access and a television with international programmes are available to all without charge. Articles of daily use that the seamen request from their ships are also procured. Free WLAN is available in the entire house.

Working alongside the employees and volunteers are occupational trainees who are spending a voluntary year of social service. As ships are often moored in the port far from the seamen's club, the seamen can be picked by the club's pick-up service and later returned to their vessels. For this free service, the club's busses travel around 250,000 km annually in the port. Since 1986 more than 1,000,000 guests have visited the seamen's club.

== Organisation and financing ==
The seamen's club is under the direction of Port Chaplains Anke Wibel and Jan Oltmanns, who was awarded the Order of Merit for his dedication and extraordinary service. They are supported by a team of 13 employees and over 80 volunteers. Seamen are mostly looked after by the employees, volunteers and young persons completing their voluntary year of social service in Duckdalben itself, but also on board the ships.

In Germany, seamen's missions are established and run as public charities. The state churches are increasingly facing financial difficulties, but they honour their responsibility and help out with financial support. The financing of Duckdalben is ensured among others by contributions from the Evangelic Lutheran Church, the Hamburg Port Authority and the ITF Seafarers Trust, by donations from several ship-owners and many private sponsors, and through sales proceeds in the shop. German seamen's missions abroad are financially supported to one half through donations and revenues from the seamen's homes and donations, and to the other half from the Evangelical Church in Germany (EKD).

== Ship visiting ==
In church services on 18 August 2018, Port Chaplain Jörn Hille was formally inducted in the position of ship visitor. Due to the short layover times that ships remain in port, many seamen do not have time to visit Duckdalben. Visits on board the vessels are often the remedy. Very important for the seafarers are the telephone, top-up and SIM-cards that Jörn Hille and his colleagues have in their packs. Before visiting a ship, they consult the club data base to see which nationalities are on board the vessel and gathers news on the seamen's home countries to take on board.

== Awards ==
On 3 December 2010 the Hamburg Duckdalben Seamen's Club was named among the world's five best clubs by the International Committee on Seafarers' Welfare (ICSW). In 2011 it was named the "Seafarers' Centre of the Year" by the International Committee on Seafarers Welfare (ICSW). The decision was announced in Geneva, home of the international organisation. The ICSW is a coalition of international maritime organisations such as the International Transport Workers' Federation (ITF), the International Labour Organisation (ILO), the International Shipping Association (ISF), the International Maritime Organisation (IMO) and the International Christian Maritime Organisation (ICMA). In the following days numerous national newspapers reported on the award.

In 2016 ISWAN, the international network for seafarers, presented the Duckdalben Seamen's Club with the first-ever "Judges' Special Award". The judges' explanation: "For the first time since the start of the International Seafarers´ Welfare Awards, the judges have chosen to honour a truly exceptional organisation with a special award for their service to the welfare of seafarers. For the last 30 years the highly qualified and dedicated colleagues of the Duckdalben International Seamen's Club have provided service to seafarers." The award ceremony took place on 24 June 2016 as part of a celebration hosted by the International Maritime Organisation (IMO) in Manila.

In 1996 Jan Oltmanns was awarded the Portugaleser in Silver, the highest honour bestowed by the Hamburg Citizens' Association for service to the citizens of Hamburg. In 2012 he received the Order of Merit from the Federal Republic of Germany. In 2016 Anke Wibel was also awarded the Portugaleser.

== See also ==
- The Mission to Seafarers
