= Stella Maris (seafarers' ministry) =

Agency of the Catholic Church

Stella Maris, founded as Apostleship of the Sea (AoS), is an international agency of the Catholic Church that provides pastoral care to seafarers, other maritime workers, and their families.

Stella Maris offers practical and pastoral care to all seafarers, regardless of nationality, belief or race. The 'Apostleship of the Sea in Great Britain' is part of an international network known to the maritime world as Stella Maris, working in more than 311 ports served by 216 port chaplains in more than 30 countries around the world.

== Name ==
Founded as 'Apostleship of the Sea' (AoS), the organization and its centers were commonly known as 'Stella Maris' because of their association with the Virgin Mary as Our Lady, Star of the Sea. In 2020, its name was officially changed to Stella Maris. 'Stella Maris' was also the name of Pope John Paul II's 1997 motu proprio outlining the purpose and organizational structure of the ministry.

== History ==
The modern movement for a Catholic seafarers' ministry began with several isolated and independent beginnings. In 1891 the Apostleship of Prayer first posted devotional magazines and books from Wimbledon College to twelve ships and began enrolling seafarers in a Catholic association. Two years later, The Society of Saint Vincent de Paul commenced visiting seafarers in the ports of Bristol, Sunderland, and Tyneside. In the same year a Catholic Seafarers’ Centre opened in Montreal.

The Apostleship of the Sea port ministry was formally founded in Glasgow in 1920. At this time Britain had one of the largest merchant fleets in the world, employing many thousands of British seafarers. The Apostleship of the Sea ran large seafarers’ hostels in all the major port towns where seafarers could stay while their ships were in port, often for weeks at a time. Hundreds of volunteers from the local parishes were involved in providing hospitality and entertainment for seafarers in these hostels, which were often full. Subsequently, through changes in technology crews became smaller and spent less time in port resulting in a reduced need for hostels so most contact is now through ships visits and drop-in centres.

It was a founding member of the International Christian Maritime Association in 1969. Many of its members in North America and the Caribbean are also members of the North American Maritime Ministry Association (NAMMA), and many board members and presidents of NAMMA are also ministers of Stella Maris.

== Organization ==
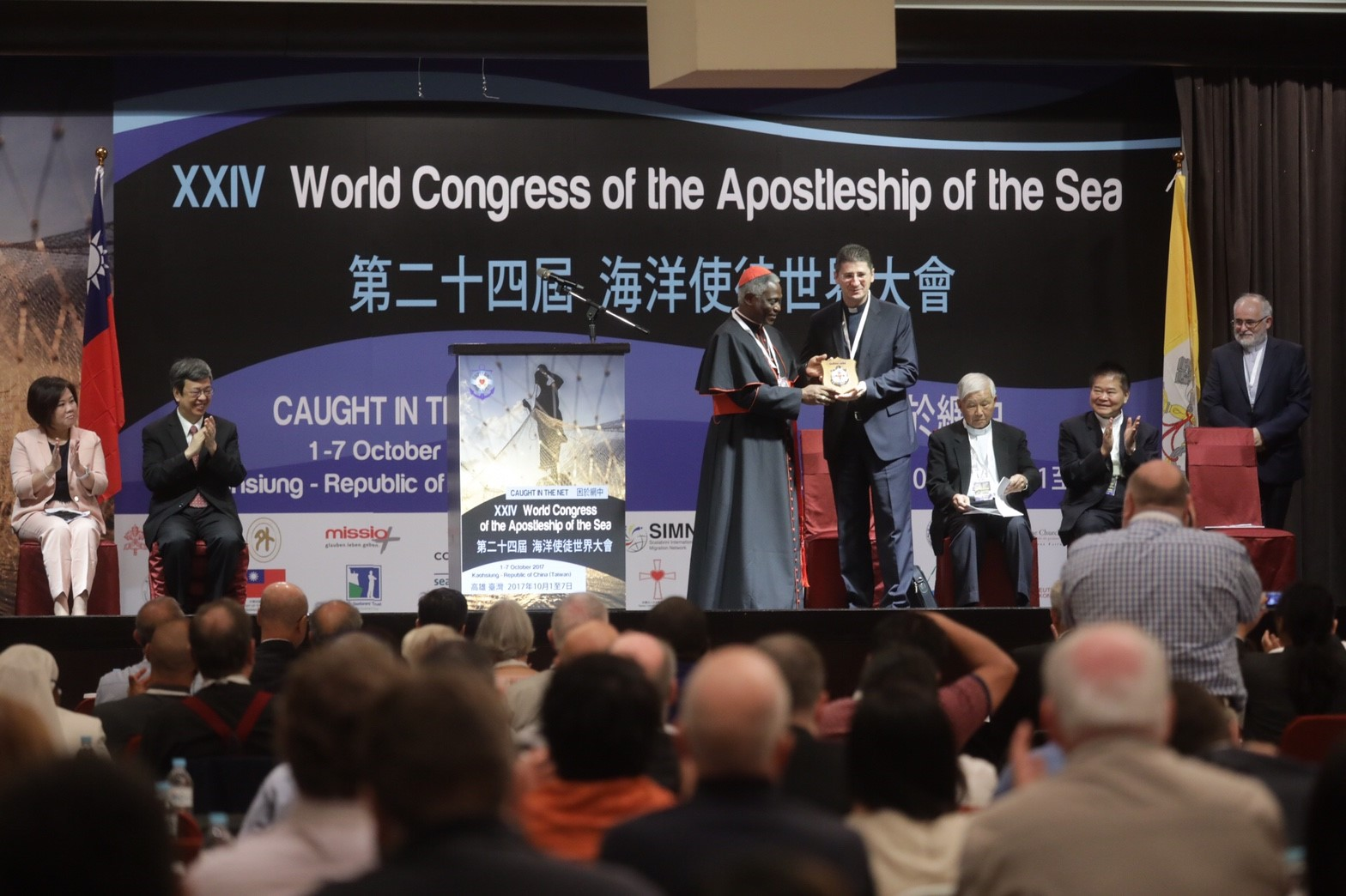
Apostleship of the Sea

In every major country, a bishop serves as the Stella Maris episcopal promoter, overseeing the work of the national director. It is the director's responsibility to coordinate the chaplains’ efforts and to assist them in developing their ministries. Each country hosts an annual conference. Tying all these national conferences together is the Pontifical Council for the Pastoral Care of Migrants and Itinerant People. Because Stella Maris' “parishioners” move around the world, it is necessary that their pastors be in touch with one another. A world congress held by the international office ensures this connection between countries and disseminates the pontifical council's policies every 5 years.

Stella Maris is a member organisation of the Caritas Social Action Network (CSAN).

== Ministry ==
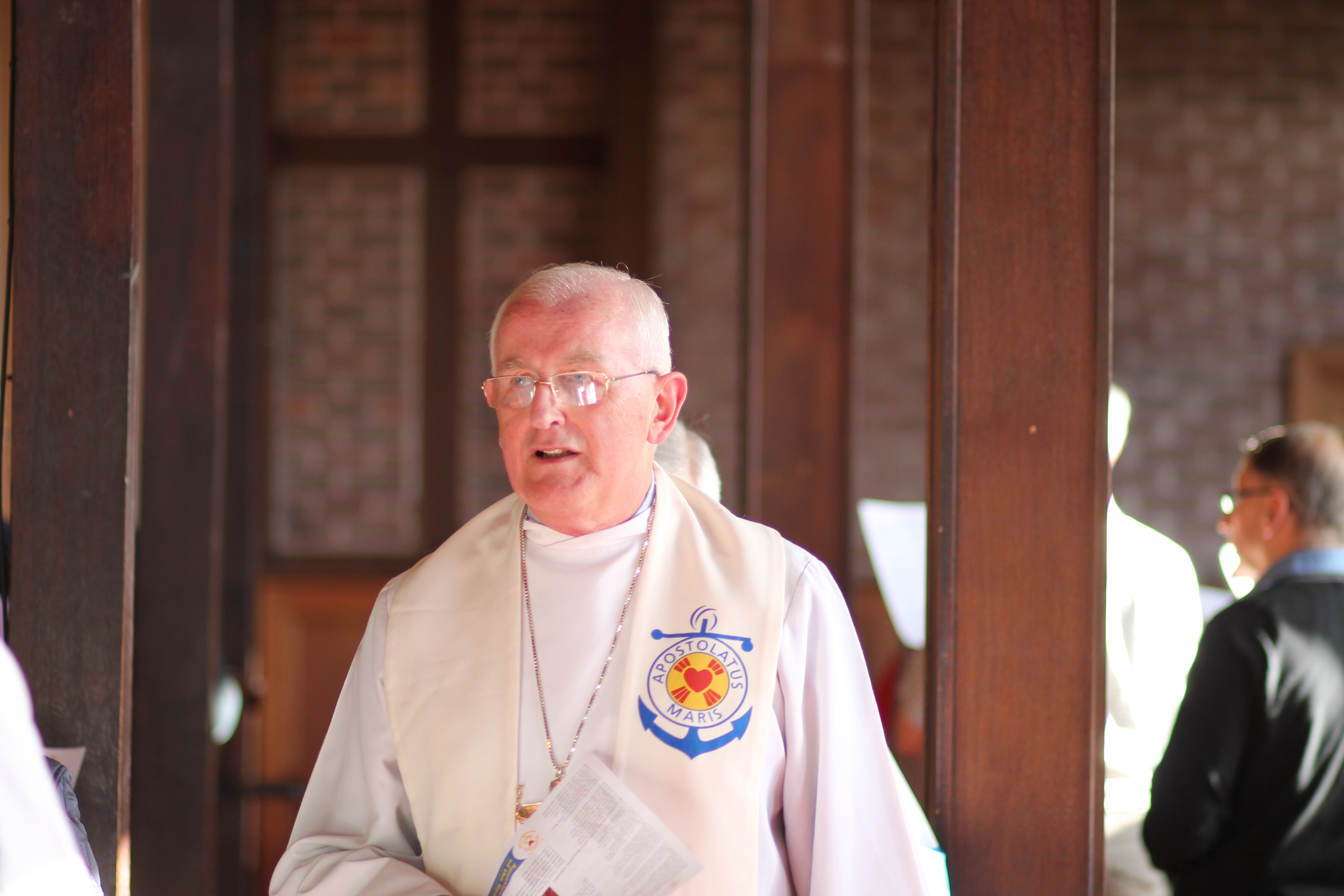
Tom Burns, bishop promoter for the AoS in England and Wales

Most of its missions are under the care of Missionaries of St. Charles - Scalabrinian, a congregation that has a specific charism for seafarers and migrants.

Each year on the second Sunday of July the Catholic Church remembers seafarers and prays for them, their families and those who support them. Sea Sunday is Stella Maris' principal fundraising and awareness raising event of the year.

== Activities ==
In the Diocese of St. Augustine in Florida, Stella Maris operates seafarer centers at the Talleyrand and Blount Island terminals in Jacksonville.

== See also ==
- Sailors' Society
- Finnish Seamen's Mission (Lutheran)
- International Seafarers' Welfare and Assistance Network
- Mission to Seafarers (Anglican)
- The Marine Society (Seafarers' Charity)
- The Royal National Mission to Deep Sea Fishermen (UK)
- Sailortown
