= The Mission to Seafarers =

UK-based Christian welfare charity

- Founded: 1856
- Type: International organization
- Purpose: Seafarers' fatigue, facilitating communication, ship abandonment, mental health, victims of piracy, shipwrecks, death and injury, food
- Location: London, United Kingdom
- Region served: Worldwide
- Website: http://www.missiontoseafarers.org/
- Formerly called: The Missions to Seamen

The Mission to Seafarers (formerly The Missions to Seamen) is a Christian welfare charity serving merchant crews around the world. It operates through a global network of chaplains, staff and volunteers and provides practical, emotional and spiritual support through ship visits, drop-in seafarers centres and a range of welfare and emergency support services.

The flag with a flying angel was adopted in 1858. The idea of the symbol is based on a verse from Revelation 'Then I saw an angel flying in mid-heaven, with an eternal gospel to proclaim to those on earth, to every nation and tribe, language and people.'

== Work ==
The Mission to Seafarers is a mission society of the Anglican Communion which offers help and support to merchant seafarers. The charity provides its services through the chaplains that it appoints to port centres in over 50 countries. Ship visitors supported by volunteers, are able to give free advice about employment issues or personal problems, as well as offer help in maritime emergencies. Through its centres the Mission to Seafarers provides communications, stores, transport services and publishes a bi-monthly news digest for seafarers called The Sea.

== Network ==
The Mission to Seafarers has operations in over 200 ports around the world. In over 120 of these ports, the mission has seafarers' centres – known as Flying Angel Centres, or Flying Angel Clubs – which offer communications facilities and rest and relaxation areas, and in some cases, accommodation. Sometimes, seafarers' centres are provided in ecumenical partnership with other organisations such as the Catholic Stella Maris. The rest of the charity's presence is made up of part-time or full-time chaplains, who offer onboard support services to seafarers.

The Mission to Seafarers is a founding member of the International Christian Maritime Association, and its members in Canada and the United States are also members of the North American Maritime Ministry Association.

Its central office is in the church of St Michael Paternoster Royal, College Hill, London EC4R 2RL. This church, founded by Sir Richard Whittington was rebuilt by Sir Christopher Wren, and contains carvings by Grinling Gibbons. The church is open Monday to Friday 9am to 4pm excluding holidays.

== History ==
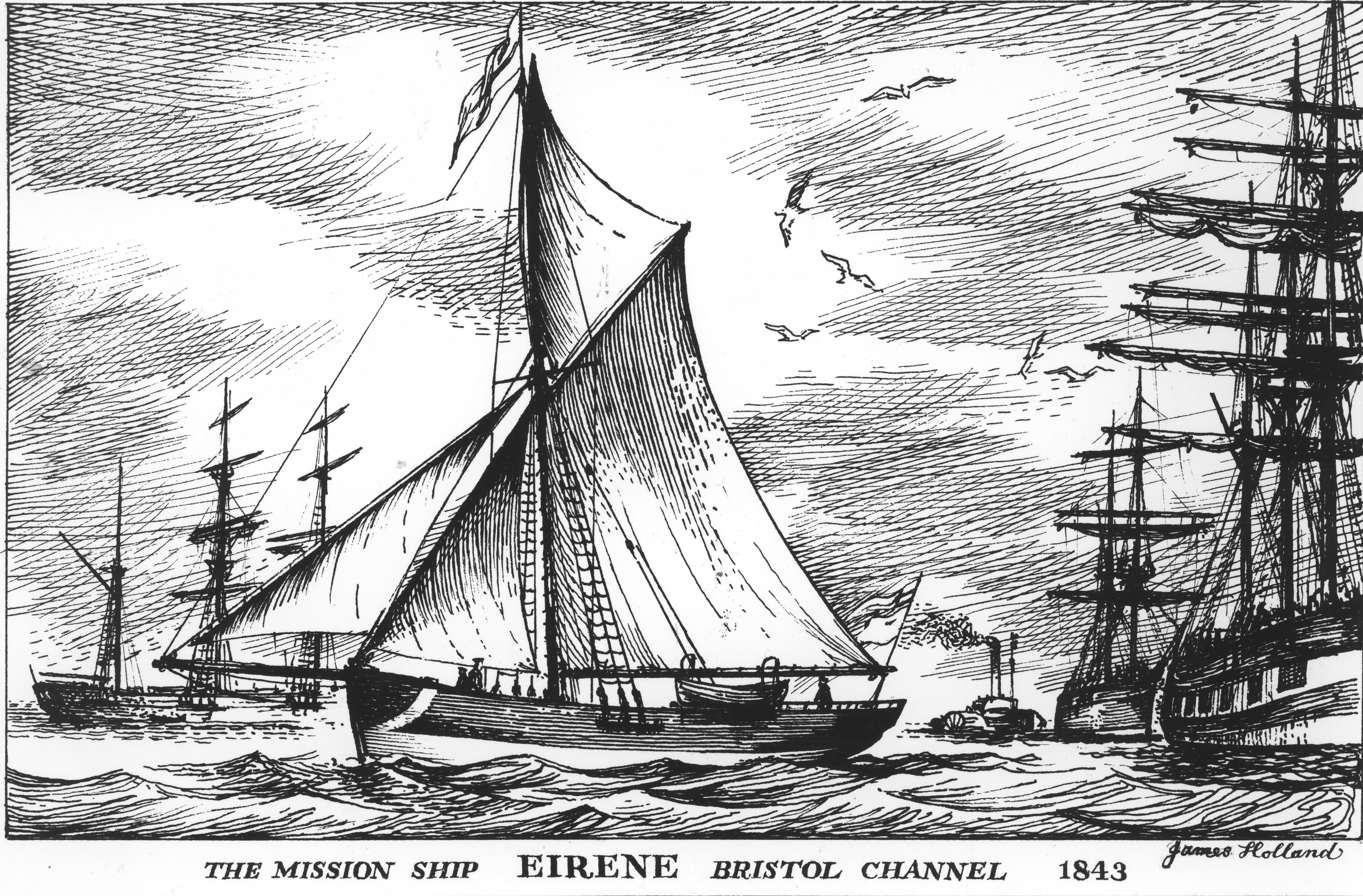
The mission cutter Eirene in Bristol in 1843

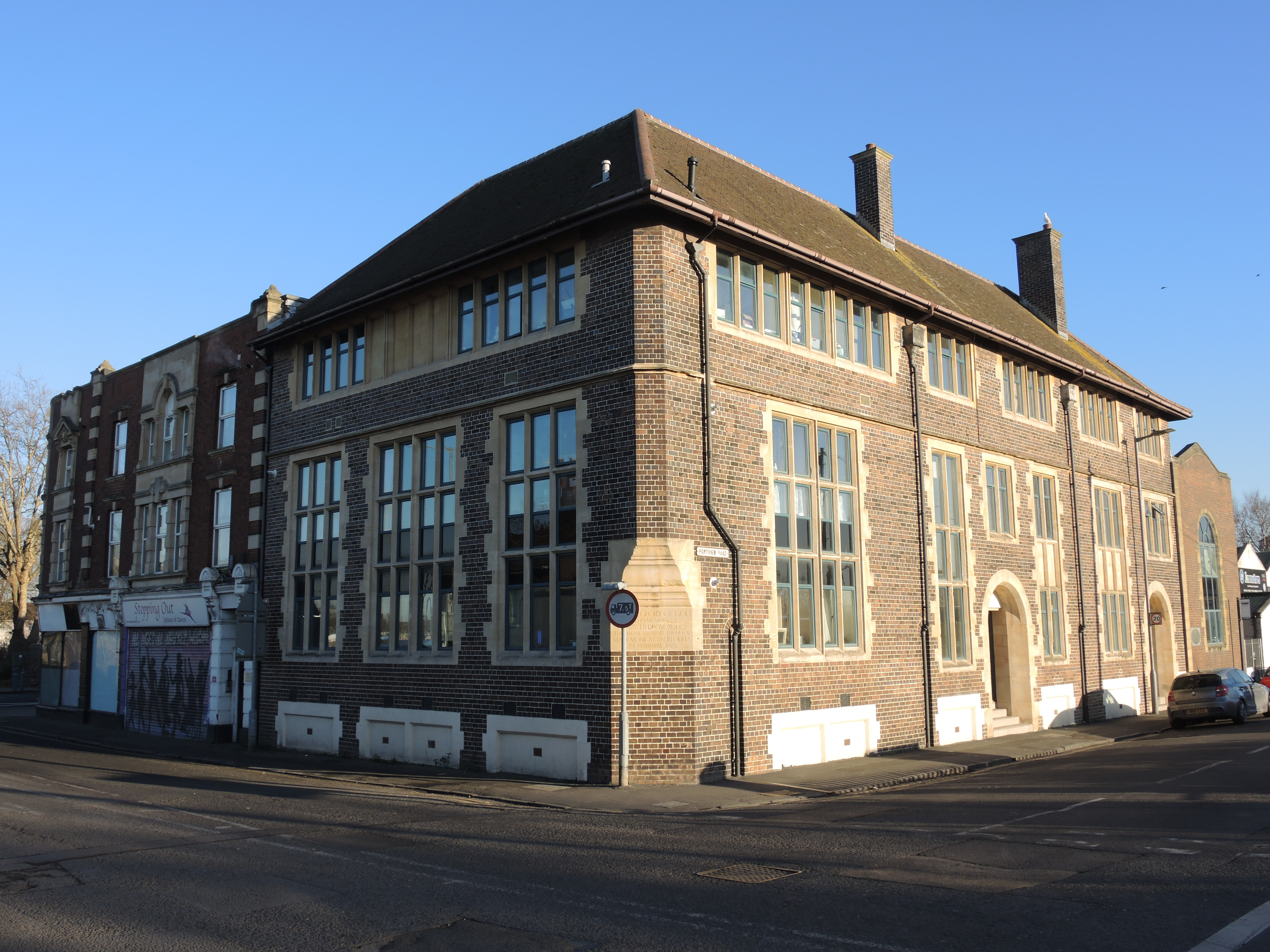
The former Mission in Avonmouth, Bristol's later port

The Mission to Seafarers has its roots in the work of Anglican priest, John Ashley who in 1835 was on the shore at Clevedon with his son who asked him how the people on ships in the Bristol Channel could go to church. Recognising the needs of the seafarers on the four hundred sailing vessels in the Bristol Channel, he created the Bristol Channel Mission. He raised funds, and in 1839 a specially designed mission cutter named Eirene was built with a main cabin which could be converted into a chapel for 100 people.

His work inspired similar ministries in the UK, and it was decided in 1856 that these groups should be formally organised under the name The Mission to Seamen Afloat, at Home and Abroad. In 1858, this name was changed to The Missions to Seamen, and the organisation adopted its Flying Angel logo, still in use to this day.

As shipping transitioned from sail to steam methods, there became a need for places for seafarers to go while they were ashore, as ships could now dock at quaysides because they no longer had to anchor at sea waiting for a favourable wind. In response, the mission gradually opened centres so that the men could be offered light refreshments, reading and games rooms, good cheap accommodation and a chapel. The mission now operates over 250 centres in the world.

== Notable supporters ==
The president is Princess Anne.

== See also ==
- The Royal National Mission to Deep Sea Fishermen
- The Marine Society
- Seamen's Church Institute of New York and New Jersey
- Centres for Seafarers
- Trinity House
- Duckdalben International Seamen’s Club
- Sailortown
- Sailors' Society
