= Fishermen's Mission =

British charitable organisation

Royal National Mission to Deep Sea Fishermen
- Formation: 1881
- Founded: 1881
- Founder: Ebenezer Joseph Mather
- Type: Charitable organisation
- Registration no.: England and Wales: 232822 Scotland: SC039088
- Legal status: Charity
- Purpose: Providing practical, Spiritual, financial and emotional support to active and retired fishermen and their families as well as a 24/7 emergency service to assist with accidents or illness at sea. Not just Deep sea anymore.
- Headquarters: Mather House, 4400 Parkway, Solent Business Park, Whiteley, Hampshire, PO15 7FJ
- Location: All round the UK
- Region served: United Kingdom
- Website: www.fishermensmission.org.uk

Fishermen's Mission (since 2014), officially The Royal National Mission to Deep Sea Fishermen (RNMDSF), is a British charitable organisation founded in 1881 to help those working in the UK's fishing industry. The charity, which is run on Christian principles, supports and welcomes persons of all faiths and none. It was founded at the end of the 19th century (1881) to provide assistance and support to the impoverished fishing communities around the coasts of Britain.

== Foundation ==
Fishermen's Mission was founded as "the National Mission to Deep Sea Fishermen" by Ebenezer Joseph Mather in 1881. Mather was disturbed by the poor conditions in which fishermen worked and lived and knew something needed to be done to help alleviate their troubles. In the 19th century fishing was notoriously dangerous with high fatality rates and the occupation remains today as one of the most dangerous. Sir Wilfred Grenfell served in the Fishermen's Mission until he was sent to help fishing communities in the Dominion of Newfoundland. It is where he founded the Grenfell Mission in 1892.

In 1896 the mission was given the royal approval by Queen Victoria adding "Royal" to the mission's name.

== Aims ==
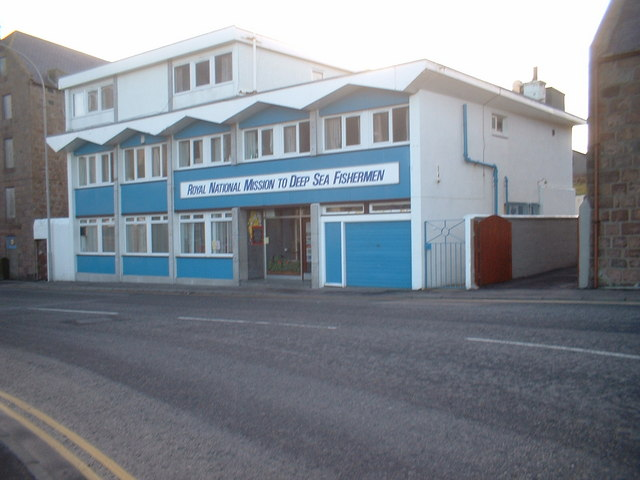
Fishermen's Mission in Peterhead, Scotland

The Fishermen's Mission aims to provide financial, emotional and pastoral support to fishermen and their families in over 70 ports and harbours throughout the United Kingdom and the Isle of Man. The Mission Centres provide showers, washing machines, accommodation, food, companionship and recreational activities (such as snooker tables and internet access).

During both the First and Second World Wars, the Fishermen's Mission provided help to the merchant marine sailors and fisherman recruited to serve on the convoys, undertook mine sweeping patrols, and continued to fish despite the dangers of aerial attack.

== Mission ships ==
The purpose of a 'mission ship' was to provide pastoral and spiritual support for fishermen at sea. The first Mission Ship to be commissioned was Alpha in 1900, followed by Joseph & Sarah Miles, and Queen Alexandra in 1902. As well as being hospital ships, they were all equipped with fishing-gear and sent their fish to market with the rest of the fleet. In 1911, the ships were described as:

A Mission ship is one of the most interesting vessels afloat. She is a cruising hospital, a place of worship, a tobacco shop, a clothing establishment, a free library, a club-room, an hotel, and a recreation ground. If a smacksman is sick or injured, he will be fetched on board and receive skilled attention until he is better; if he wants to attend service and hoists a signal to indicate his wish, the Mission boat will call for him.

The great difference between a Mission ship and an ordinary trawler, in connection with fishing, was that Mission ships did not fish on Sundays, whereas very many of the ordinary steam-trawlers did. As a hospital ship these vessels carried a surgeon and surgeon's mate, along with a crew capable of turning their hands to nursing. A complete surgical outfit of instruments was available, including the ability to take X-rays. The hospital contained two swing cots and four berths for patients.

== See also ==
- Apostleship of the Sea
- Sailors' Society
- Mission to Seafarers
