= Seamen's Church Institute =

American maritime nonprofit organization

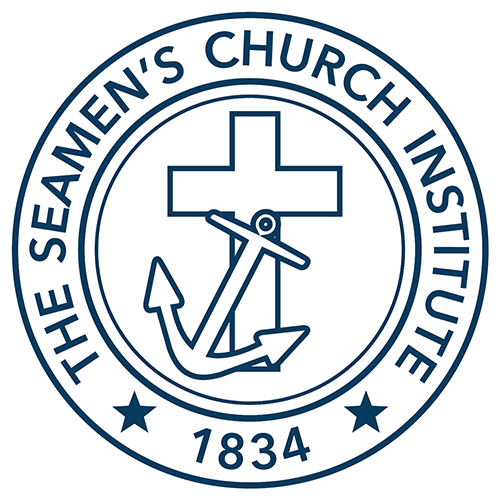
Seamen's Church Institute logo

The Seamen's Church Institute (SCI; formerly known as the Seamen's Church Institute of New York and New Jersey) is an American maritime nonprofit organization that serves mariners and seafarers through chaplaincy, crisis response, training, feasibility studies, legal advocacy, and maritime policy. Founded in Lower Manhattan in 1834, it is affiliated with the Episcopal Church. With a budget of over $7 million, SCI is the largest, most comprehensive mariners' agency in North America. The institute is headquartered in New York City and operates the International Seafarers' Center in Port Newark, Centers for Maritime Education in Paducah, Kentucky, and Houston, Texas, and the Center for Mariner Advocacy in New Orleans, Louisiana.

It has the EIN 13-5562356 as a 501(c)(3) Public Charity.

Annually, its chaplains visit more than 2,000 vessels in the Port of New York and New Jersey and along the American inland waterways system.

SCI provides free legal advice for merchant mariners worldwide and advocates for their rights to the United States government, including the United States Congress, the Department of Homeland Security and the U.S. Coast Guard, as well as other governments, the United Nations, the International Maritime Organization, the International Labour Organization, and maritime trade associations.

SCI instructors provide professional development and educational programs for inland and coastal mariners using simulator training facilities at SCI-Paducah and SCI-Houston.

SCI's Christmas at Sea program annually provides more than 25,000 hand-knit gifts to mariners at the holidays. CAS was founded in 1898 during the Spanish–American War.

SCI is led by the Reverend Mark S. Nestlehutt, President & Executive Director. Nestlehutt is an Episcopal minister who previously served in maritime parishes and as a naval officer.

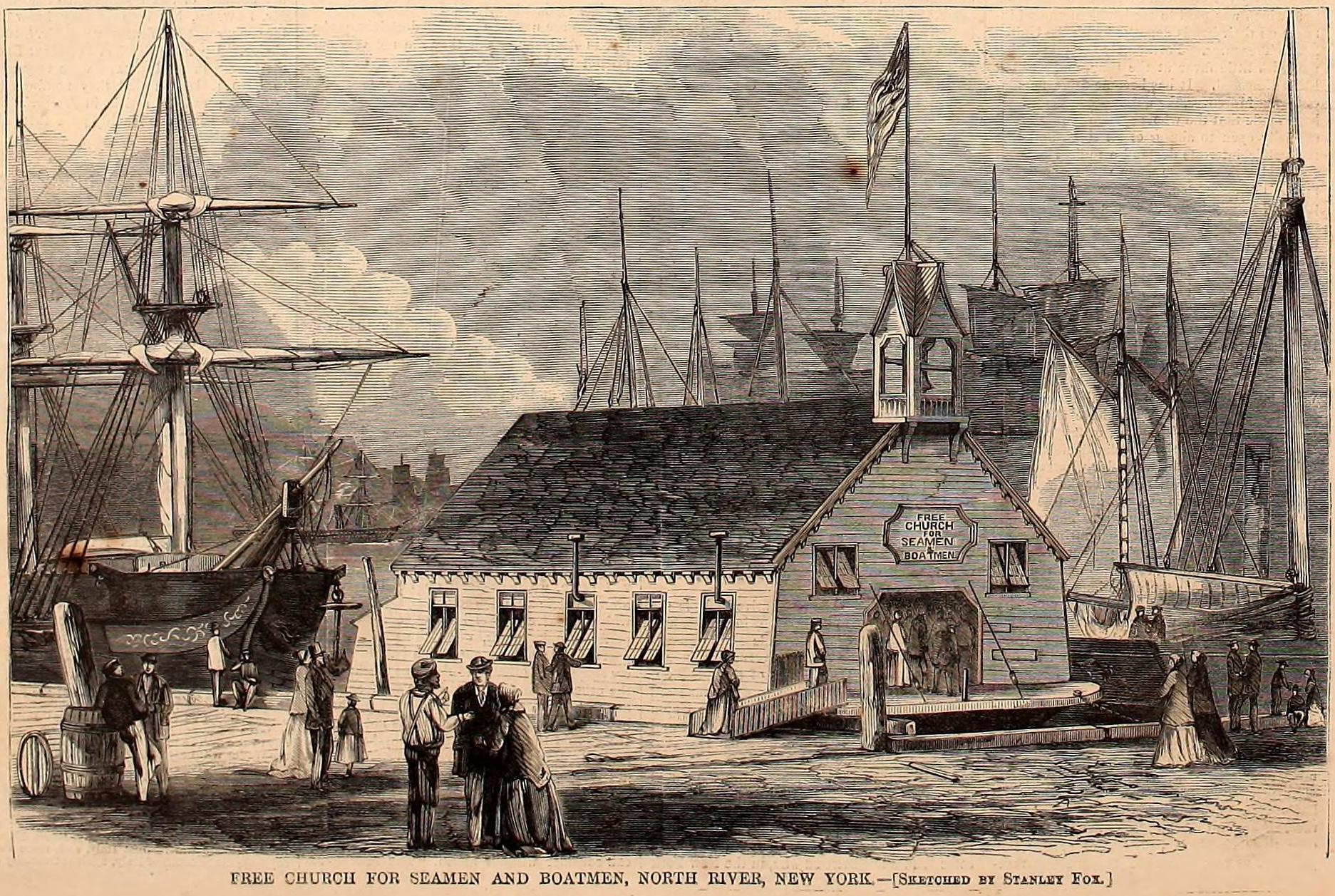
The floating Free Church for Seamen and Boatmen, in the North River, 1867

== Historical highlights (1834–2023) ==
1834: SCI is founded as the Young Men's Church Missionary Society

1844: SCI builds the Floating Church of Our Savior at the foot of Pike Street on the East River to provide a place of worship where seafarers could feel comfortable and welcome

1846: SCI builds the Floating Church of the Holy Comforter at the foot of Dey Street on the North Hudson River to accommodate seafarers and local residents

1868: SCI builds its first mission house at 34 Pike Street in the bustling New York sailortown

1896: The Joint Conference for the Protection of Seamen, a consortium of seafarers' missions and maritime law practitioners, was founded under the leadership of SCI administrators J. Augustus Johnson and the Rev. Archibald R. Mansfield.

1898: The Christmas at Sea program begins, supporting mariners during the Spanish–American War

1899: The beginnings of Maritime Education at SCI. An International Committee of Christian Workers for Seamen is founded with Mansfield as secretary.

1906: The Society formally changes its name to the Seamens Church Institute of New York

1908: Franklin D. Roosevelt joins SCI's Board, on which he remained until his death in 1945

1913: SCI opens the doors of its 12-story building at 25 South Street in Lower Manhattan with room to house up to 580 seafarers in dormitory style rooms. The headquarters also housed a shipping bureau, a restaurant, a postal service and a chapel.

1917: SCI begins training merchant marines for World War I

1920: Janet Lord Roper begins running the Missing Seamen's Bureau

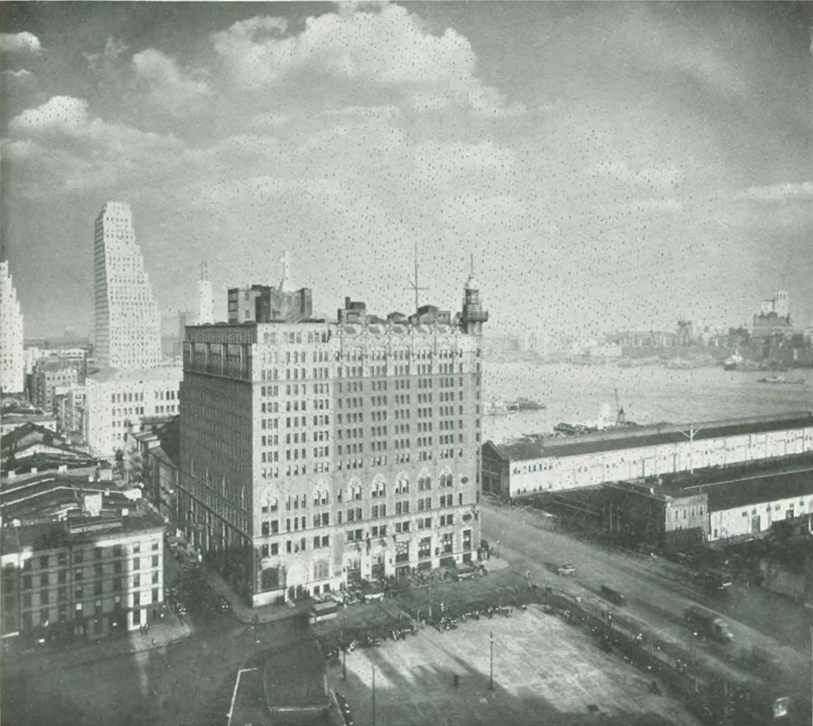
The Seamen's Church Institute of New York building at 25 South Street, Manhattan, in about 1934

1924: SCI opens an emergency homeless shelter for seafarers affected by the shipping industry's economic downturn.

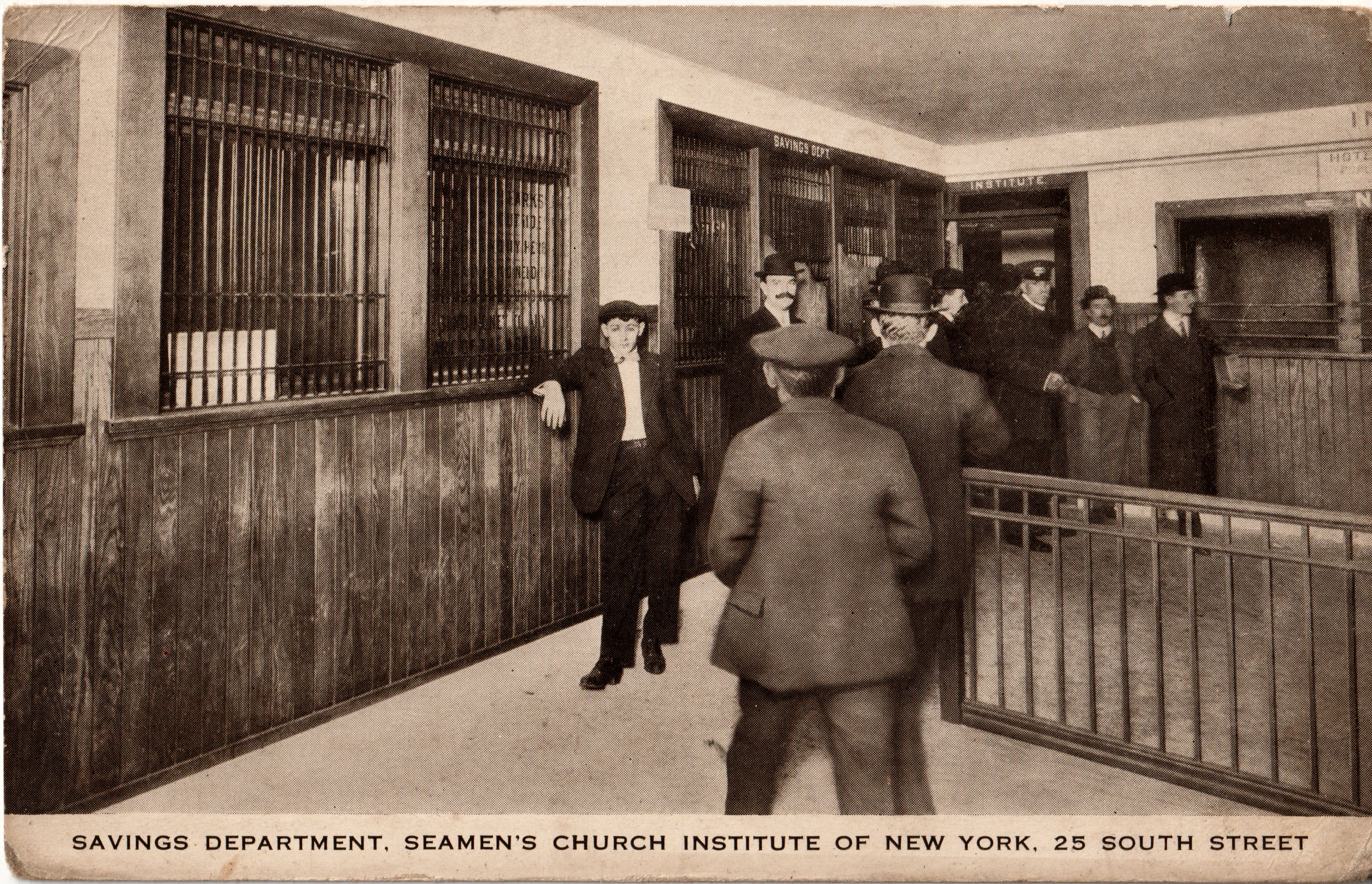
Savings department, Seamen's Church Institute of New York, 25 South Street, circa 1920s or 1930s

1938: The SCI in New York hosts the first offices of the National Group of Seamen's Agencies (NGSA), a precursor of the North American Maritime Ministry Association,"for correlating and standardizing the work of seamen's agencies across the country".

1942: SCI's Merchant Marine School expands all the way through the 13th-story roof at 25 South Street to provide rooftop instruction and pilothouse training to meet increasing wartime demand for qualified seafarers

1961: SCI dedicates its International Seafarers' Center in Port Newark, New Jersey

1968: SCI's New York City headquarters moves to an 18-story building at 15 State Street. Services include a chapel, hotel rooms, restaurant and bar, reading room, post office and credit bureau

1976: Updates name from the Seamen's Church Institute of New York to the Seamen's Church Institute of New York & New Jersey to reflect its earlier expansion into New Jersey in 1961.

1978: SCI hosts its first Silver Bell Awards Dinner, an annual event to honor an individual or group for outstanding leadership in the maritime community, significant commitment to merchant mariners and engagement with issues facing the maritime industry

1982: The Center for Seafarers' Rights is established, with approval from the International Christian Maritime Association.

1991: SCI's New York City headquarters moves to 241 Water Street. The building housed a chapel, meeting rooms, legal aid offices, classrooms for maritime education and training, an art gallery, a cafeteria, and internet access and phones for mariners' use.

1997: The Institute opens CME–Paducah in Kentucky, the first training facility of its kind for America's inland river mariners

1998: Ministry on the River begins, the only full-time pastoral care service available to mariners working on America's inland river systems

2001: SCI dedicates CME–Houston, a facility for maritime training in the Port of Houston

2001: SCI's NYC headquarters is transformed into an emergency relief station for 9/11 rescue workers, providing thousands of meals and distributing truckloads of donated supplies to aid Ground Zero workers

2005: SCI raises and distributes over $155,000 for mariners affected by Hurricanes Katrina and Rita

2009: SCI launches a study on the psychological effects of piracy on merchant mariners

2009: SCI assumes administrative responsibilities for the Life Saving Benevolent Association of New York (LSBA), an organization founded in 1849 to ""recognize and reward courage, skill and seamanship in the rescue of human life on the sea or any navigable waters..."

2010: SCI opens the doors to its renovated Seafarers' Center in Port Newark. In addition to housing SCI's Center for Seafarer's Rights and Christmas at Sea programs, the new Center contains an Internet café, telephone carrels, recreation lounge, chapel, business services, and a Health and Wellness Center.

2011: SCI sells its headquarters building at 241 Water Street and transfers its archival collections to CUNY Queens College on permanent loan. The collections are housed at the college and open to researchers, in addition to serving as teaching resources for archives students in the Graduate School of Library and Information Studies.

2013: SCI hosts first Mountain Challenge fundraiser team race over 25 miles of rugged terrain in western Maine

2014: SCI moves to new headquarters at 50 Broadway in New York City

2015: In response to the loss of the MV El Faro with all hands in October 2015, SCI established the El Faro Relief Fund to provide financial assistance to the surviving families and dependents of lost seafarers of the El Faro and other U.S. flag merchant vessels

2016: CME broadens its service offering to mariners through a new online Health, Safety and Environment e-learning program

2017: SCI conducts its first two-day Applied Suicide Intervention Skills Training (ASIST) workshop for shore-side personnel in the inland river industry at CME-Paducah

2017: CME becomes the first maritime training center in the United States to receive ISO 9001 certification for its quality management system

2018: SCI celebrates the 120th anniversary of the Christmas at Sea program by launching the 1898 Society, a planned giving initiative for volunteer knitters

2018: SCI's Ministry on the River program opens a branch office in Baton Rouge, Louisiana

2019: The U.S. Coast Guard publishes final regulations on seafarers', chaplains', and other persons' access through marine terminals, culminating advocacy efforts by SCI that started in 2001 in the wake of the 9/11 terrorist attacks

2020: SCI adapts to the COVID-19 health crisis by connecting with mariners safely via video chats, phone calls, and text messages; port chaplains arrange gangway visits and shop for seafarers unable to leave their vessels; river chaplains ramp up production and delivery of morale boxes, lowering them on ropes to towboats passing through locks; and volunteers send SCI a bumper crop of hand-knit items for Christmas at Sea gifts.

2021: SCI's Center for Mariner Advocacy (CMA), formerly known as the Center for Seafarer Rights, relocated its office to New Orleans, Louisiana.

2022: Updates name to the Seamen's Church Institute, reflecting its geographic expansion with physical structures in five states and a network of chaplains located in more than a dozen states within the U.S.

== Pastoral care and chaplaincy services ==
In the Port of New York and New Jersey, SCI chaplains visit thousands of vessels annually, providing practical services to crews and offering hospitality and pastoral care. Seafarers are offered free transportation services to and from their vessel, enabling them to visit local shopping areas. Those who visit the SCI International Seafarers' Center in Port Newark can access the Internet, contact their families at home, and enjoy a range of other amenities free of charge.

SCI's Ministry on the Rivers (MOR) program reaches out to mariners and maritime workers on the inland waterways and in the Gulf of Mexico. Three full-time chaplains and almost 30 part-time volunteer river chaplain associates board towboats and offshore vessels to offer pastoral care and hospitality.

== Maritime education and training and feasibility safety studies ==
SCI instructors provide professional development and educational programs for inland and coastal mariners using advanced simulator training at facilities in Paducah, Kentucky, and Houston, Texas. SCI also conducts feasibility studies that serve to make waterways and commercial ports safer. Feasibility studies are performed to ensure that safety parameters are evaluated and met, traffic flow is not negatively impacted, and safe navigation is maintained.

== Mariner advocacy ==
SCI's Center for Seafarer Rights (CSR) is the world's only free legal-aid program for merchant mariners. Available for consultation at any time, CSR mediates between parties to reach a resolution acceptable to everyone, often referring individual mariners to pro-bono law firms for assistance. Working with seafarer advocacy and international groups from around the world, CSR has been instrumental in improving safety and security for mariners, as well as implementing new standards relating to stowaways, piracy, repatriation, medical care and shore leave.

Taking on a new dimension to advocacy, in 2012 CSR published guidelines on "The Psychological Impact of Piracy on Seafarers". This has been followed by various studies on health and wellness among seafarers and inland mariners, including the introduction of suicide intervention training in 2017.

== Christmas at Sea ==
With more than 1,200 knitters and crocheters drawn from all 50 states, Canada and Europe, SCI's Christmas at Sea program provides over 16,000 handcrafted gifts to merchant mariners working over the Christmas holidays. Begun in 1898 during the Spanish–American War, Christmas at Sea relies on SCI chaplains who distribute gifts to international seafarers, inland river mariners and offshore workers in the Gulf of Mexico throughout the holiday season. Handcrafted items such as hats, scarves, slippers, or cowls are placed into "ditty bags" with various toiletries, candy or treats, and holiday cards made by schoolchildren are added into the care package for the mariners.

== Archives ==
SCI has an extensive physical archive collection located at Queens College, City University of New York. The institute has also digitized a portion of its archives.

== Other references ==
- PBS Religion and Ethics Newsweekly, January 7, 2011
- Seamen's Church Institute Charts New Course for 21st-Century Ministry, Episcopal Life Online, October 15, 2010
- Seamen's Knit 4 Lent initiative to serve mariners working in Gulf Coast, Episcopal Life Online, February 7, 2008
- David M. Rider named president, executive director of Seamen's Church Institute, Episcopal Life Online, October 2, 2007 https://web.archive.org/web/20080217041310/http://www.episcopalchurch.org/81831_90629_ENG_HTM.htm
- COREY KILGANNON, Men of the Sea, Marooned at the Ramada, The New York Times, New York and Region, January 22, 2005
- Wakin, Daniel J. (July 24, 2003). "Marooned, Just Feet From Shore; Tighter Security Keeps Foreign Crews on Ships". The New York Times.
- Smith, Jean (December 5, 2001). "A Seaman's Plight". The New York Times.
- George Harding, On Admiralty Service, Harpers Magazine, December 1917
- Norman Duncan, Youngsters of the seven seas, Harpers Magazine, December 1910
