= Sailors' Society =

Sailors’ Society works with the global maritime industry, supporting seafarers and their families in need through our helpline, crisis response network, wellness training, emergency grants and peer support groups.

For more than 200 years, maritime welfare charity Sailors’ Society has been transforming the lives of the world’s 1.9 million seafarers and their families. Today, they support seafarer’ wellbeing across every area of their lives and careers, offering 24/7 practical, emotional and spiritual welfare support, giving them the best opportunity to enjoy a fulfilling - and productive - career at sea. Sailor’s Society’s global support team speaks a variety of languages and is available around the clock to all seafarers and their loved ones whenever and wherever they need help, whether miles out to sea, in a busy port or at home. This vital support comes from virtual chaplaincy, a helpline, the acclaimed Crisis Response Network and the ground-breaking Peer-to-Peer support programme that has over 2,000 members and is still growing. Sailors' Society also runs a hugely successful and pioneering Wellness at Sea programme, which provides a complete circle of care to help crews and companies thrive. This training and support package is the most comprehensive and long-running in the maritime industry. It includes Sea Ready pre-departure training, hosted wellness training, global cadet conferences and the MyWellness e-learning platform and app used by more than 3,000 seafarers.

== History ==
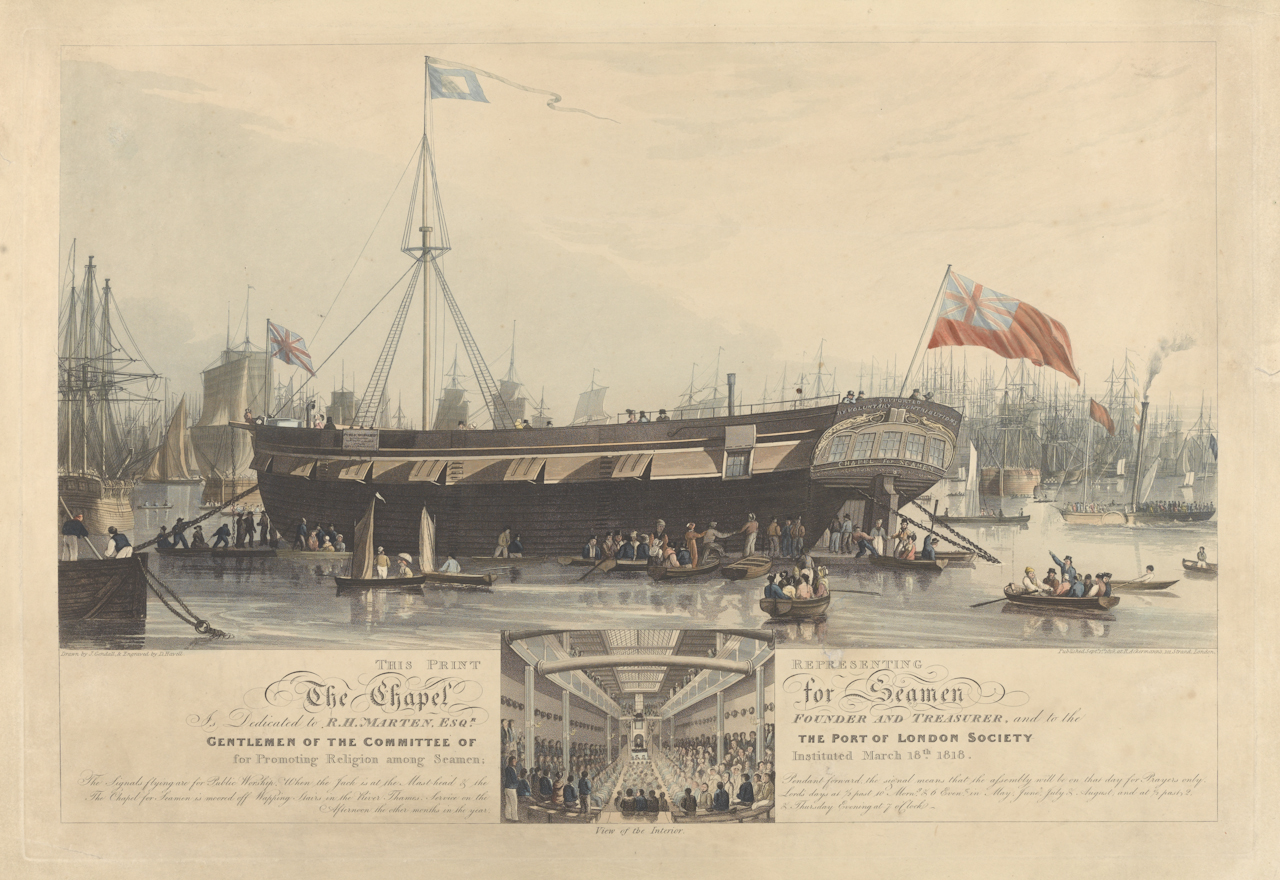
The Chapel for Seamen - Port of London Society - Instituted March 18th 1818 - moored off Wapping Stairs in the river Thames. View of the Interior (inset)

In 1817, George Charles "Bosun" Smith called a meeting at the City of London Tavern in Bishopsgate. The meeting led to the charity's formation on 18 March 1818, as the Port of London Society for Promoting the Religious Instruction of British Seamen. The founder and treasurer of the society was Robert Humphrey Marten (1763–1839).

An estimated 45,000 seafarers were visiting the port of London annually and the Society moored a former sloop of war on the River Thames, the Mars, renaming it the Ark, and repurposing it as a floating chapel where seafarers could congregate and pray.

Social reformer Elizabeth Fry asked the charity to send books for her to pass on to men posted at coastguard stations and the First Lord of the Treasury Robert Peel made a grant of £500 to help the organisation's cause.

In 1834 Sailors' Society appointed its first full-time chaplain Benjamin Prynn, as its Thames missionary, followed by a full-time missionary in Cape Town. In his first year alone, Prynn spoke to 50,000 seafarers.

In 1871, with the support of Giuseppe Garibaldi, the charity set up a Sailors' Rest and Institute in Genoa.

The organisation launched its magazine, Chart & Compass, in 1879.

At this time, Sailors' Society's received patronage from not only the British royal family but also Czar Alexander III of Russia and King Umberto I of Italy.

In 1902, the charity founded the King Edward VII Nautical School for 'hardy and heroic sons of the sea'.

The Lords of the Admiralty donated copper and wood from HMS Victory to Sailors' Society, which the charity made into coins, plaques and busts to fundraise with.

The only junior officer to die when Titanic sank in 1912, sixth officer James Paul Moody, had trained at the Society's King Edward VII Nautical School in 1910.

During World War I the charity supported thousands of seafarers from torpedoed vessels. These included survivors of the SS Belgian Prince, HMHS Rewa and HMAT Warilda. In the final months of World War I, Sailors’ Society supported more than 14,000 people from torpedoed ships.

In 1918, Sailors’ Society marked its centenary with services and meetings at Mansion House, London, the People's Palace and a Jutland Day celebration at the Royal Albert Hall on 31 May.

Among those who sent messages of congratulations on the charity's centenary were King George V, Prime Minister David Lloyd George and President of the United States Woodrow Wilson.

In 1918 the Society opened new rests for seamen in Poole, Southampton, Dartmouth, Limehouse, Aberdour, Preston, Ardrossan, Rosyth, Buncrana, Bristol and Gosport.

The Prince of Wales launched a special appeal to raise money for the charity's cause in 1923 and the following year, the organisation built the Empire Memorial Hostel at Limehouse, which was opened by one of Queen Victoria's granddaughters, Princess Marie Louise, so that seafarers could have a 'clean and airy' place to stay.

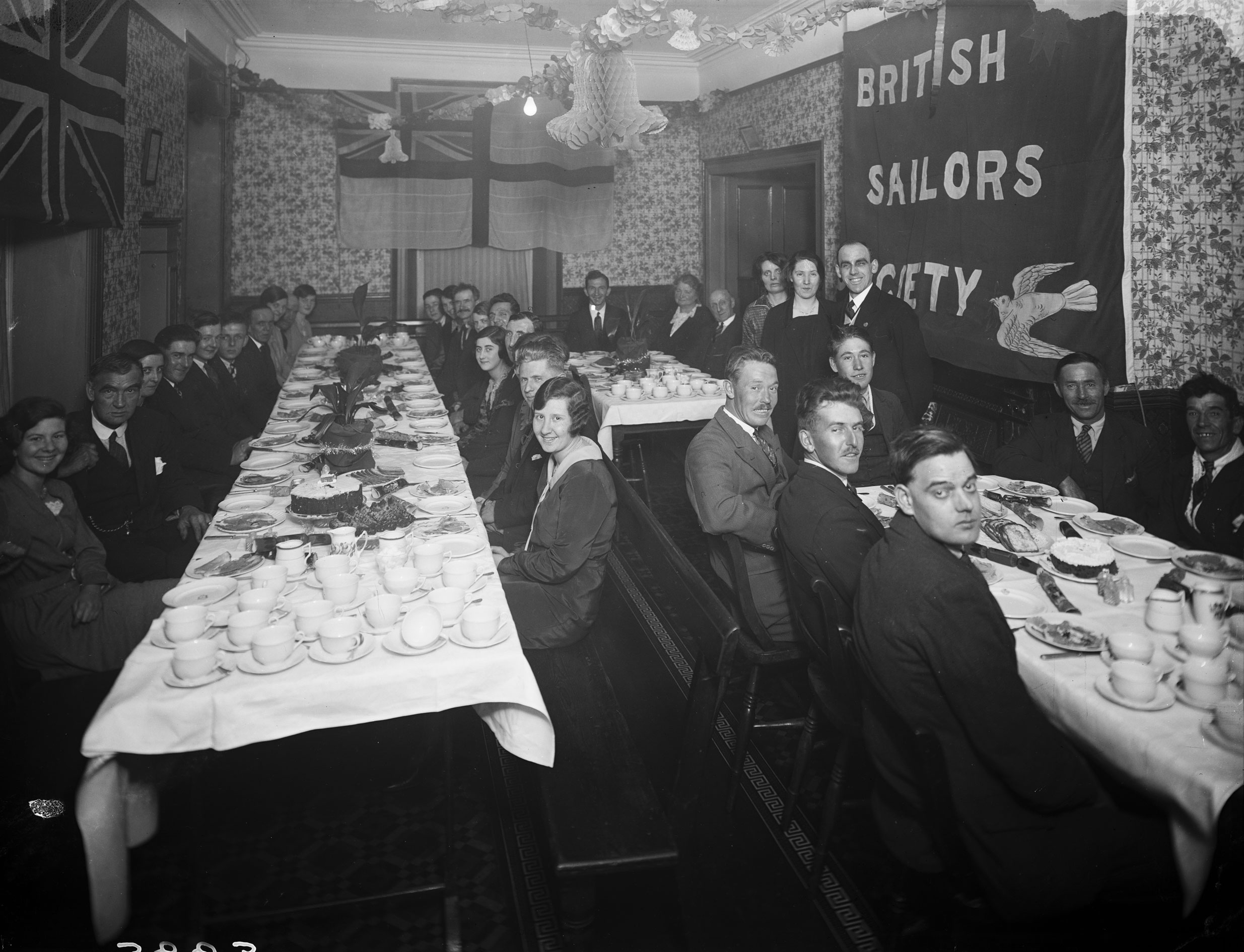
Christmas festivities at Waterford's Sailors' Rest, 1931. Waterford, Ireland

Princess Marie Louise's involvement continued a long tradition of royal endorsement and support. King George V – the ‘Sailor King’ – had been patron since 1892 and made regular donations. When he died in 1936, King Edward VIII and, on his abdication, King George VI, continued the royal family's connection and annual subscription to the Society.

The liner SS Athenia was the first British ship torpedoed during World War II on 3 September 1939 and resulted in the loss of nearly 120 people. A further 981 were rescued, with many taken to Galway where they were tended to by, among others, Sailors' Society's chaplain.

In 1939, crews from 41 ships hit by German action were cared for at the Society's stations and at the height of the conflict, the charity funded a sea ambulance to help injured seafarers.

Survivors from the sinking of HMS Ark Royal were cared for at one of the charity's Sailors' Rests.

British Sailors' Society (Scotland) ran a children's home, known as Lagarie Children's Home, which was located on the banks of the Gareloch on the outskirts of the village of Rhu, by Helensburgh. The Society ran the home from October 1949 until it closed in 1982. Lagarie House was built in 1901 by renowned architect Alexander Nisbet Paterson, and had a large dining room, three reception areas, offices and staff break rooms. It had a total of six dormitories and large bedrooms. The home was intended for use by seafarers whose families were in need of help with their children, be it to give the parents respite during a family crisis or in some cases a home due to the loss of a family member and the father could not manage and go to sea at the same time. It was also used to allow a seafarer to take his wife away with him for a trip while he worked. At one stage up to 60 children being cared for. The home was run on purely charitable income.

In 1956 there were an estimated 156,000 Merchant Navy men sailing under the British flag and John Mills made a televised appeal to help the charity raise £150,000.

The organisation had a seafarers' centre in Hamburg, which in 1960 provided welfare support to the Beatles, who recognised Sailors' Society as the same charity in their native Liverpool.

The early 1960s saw the Society expand, with the opening of the first new seafarers' club in New Zealand for 25 years followed by clubs at Aden and one in Tema, Ghana.

In 1968 Sailors' Society celebrated its 150th anniversary with a service at Westminster Abbey, which was attended by Queen Elizabeth the Queen Mother.

During the Falklands War the Society's chaplains made more than 400 visits to anxious families.

In March 1987, the Herald of Free Enterprise capsized claiming 193 lives. Chaplains from the charity supported survivors and the families of the lost, the organisation has held the annual service of remembrance in Dover ever since.

In 1993, Queen Elizabeth II led the charity's 175th anniversary service, which was held at Southampton Docks and broadcast on Songs of Praise. A 3,500-strong congregation, which included Prince Andrew, took part with thousands more taking up vantage points around the docks.

On 18 March 2018 the charity celebrated its 200th birthday and held a service at Southwark Cathedral on 24 April, where Prince Michael of Kent spoke about his family's longstanding links with the charity.

Following mergers with two other societies, the name was changed to The British & Foreign Sailors’ Society. In 1925 it was changed to The British Sailors’ Society. In 1995 the name was changed to The British & International Sailors’ Society. The most recent name change took place on 1 December 2007 when the present name was adopted.

The Society is an interdenominational charity and has close links with many of the mainstream Protestant Churches in the United Kingdom, such as the Baptist Union, Church of Scotland, United Reformed Church, and the Methodist Church. The charity's head office is in Southampton, England.

The Society is international and in addition to its presence in the UK it operates in Albania, Belgium, Brazil, Ghana, Réunion, Russia, India, Indonesia, Liberia, Madagascar, Mozambique, Myanmar, Singapore, South Africa, the Philippines and Ukraine.

=== Children's Home Abuse Scandal ===
In 2018, more than twelve former residents at the Lagarie Children's Home claimed that they were physically and sexually abused by staff while living there. Stuart Rivers (Sailor's Society chief executive) accepted that the Society should take some responsibility and stated that the Society was providing counselling for some survivors.

The Society has been criticised by some of those claiming abuse, for opposing a move by the Scottish Government to remove the 'time bar' law, which prevents victims of historical abuse from bringing civil actions. Survivors are encouraged to contact the Sailors Society via their website

The alleged abuse of children at Lagarie Children's Home was investigated by BBC Disclosure. The episode was broadcast in September 2018.

== Locations ==
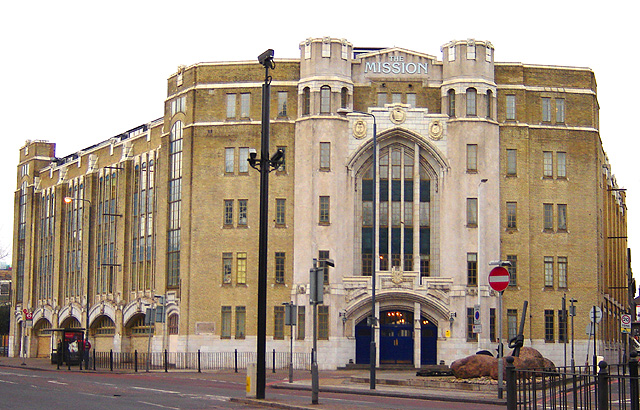
The Mission in Limehouse, where Situationist International held its conference in 1960

The Society has port chaplains and seafarers' welfare centres at various ports around the world. It also operated a retirement home, Sir Gabriel Wood's Mariners' Asylum - in Greenock, Scotland. Within the UK the Society has a presence at Aberdeen, Arbroath, Dundee, Felixstowe, Grangemouth, Leith (port of Edinburgh), Manchester Ship Canal, Milford Haven, Montrose, Portland, Dorset, Port Talbot and South Wales Ports, Portbury (near Bristol), Seaham (County Durham), Southampton and the Wirral (Mersey).

In New Zealand, an independent Society, the International Sailors' Society New Zealand Incorporated, coordinates the activities of six independent seafarers' welfare organisations (all registered charities) in the ports of Auckland, Bluff, Dunedin (Otago), New Plymouth (Taranaki), Bay of Plenty (Mt Maunganui) and (since 2011) Wellington. Another in Lyttelton recently (2009) went into recess. Sailors' Society in New Zealand is linked to Sailors' Society (UK) but is self-governing and self-supporting.

Independent bodies, similarly linked to the UK, also exist in South Africa and Canada.

== Wellness at Sea ==
Beginning with the launch of Wellness at Sea in January 2015, the Society has since provided a number of different health and well-being initiatives, such as Health Centres in Philippines, mobile clinic in India, ear and eye testing in India and additional plans to create a psychosocial project in the Philippines. Wellness at Sea is a training programme for seafarers that equips them to improve their wellbeing while at sea. The programme also has a companion app and e-learning platform.

== Crisis Response ==
Sailors’ Society's Crisis Response Network provides a rapid response trauma care and counselling service for survivors of piracy attacks, natural disasters and crises at sea. The network includes over 50 crisis responders, specially trained in trauma support, and operates globally to support seafarers and their families.

== See also ==
- Apostleship of the Sea (Roman Catholic)
- Finnish Seamen's Mission (Finnish Lutheran)
- Fishermen's Mission (UK)
- International Christian Maritime Association
- Mission to Seafarers (Anglican)
