= Norwegian Church (disambiguation) =

Norwegian Church may refer to:

== Church organisations ==
=== Norway ===
- Church of Norway, a Lutheran denomination of Protestant Christianity
- Church City Mission, a diaconal foundation in many cities and towns in Norway
- Norwegian Church Abroad, or the Norwegian Seamen's Church
- Norwegian Church Aid, a Norwegian humanitarian and ecumenical organisation, relief work in many countries
- Catholic Church in Norway
- Church of Norway in Exile, a former independent Lutheran deanery
- Evangelical Lutheran Free Church of Norway

=== United States ===
- The Norwegian Lutheran Church in the United States
- United Norwegian Lutheran Church of America
  - Norwegian Augustana Synod
  - Conference of the Norwegian-Danish Evangelical Lutheran Church of America

== Church buildings ==
=== Norway ===
- Churches in Norway
  - Brampton Lutheran Church in Western Norway Emigration Center, Radøy, Norway, relocated from Brampton Township, North Dakota, U.S.

=== South Georgia ===
- Norwegian Anglican Church, Grytviken, formerly Norwegian Lutheran Church

=== United Kingdom ===
- Norwegian Church, Cardiff
- Norwegian Church, Swansea
- Norwegian Fishermans' Church, Liverpool
- Norwegian Church, London, one of the Nordic churches in London

=== United States ===
- List of Norwegian churches in the United States

== See also ==
- Stave church (includes list of such churches, including Norwegian ones)
