= Danish Seamen's Church and Church Abroad =

Danish Protestant church

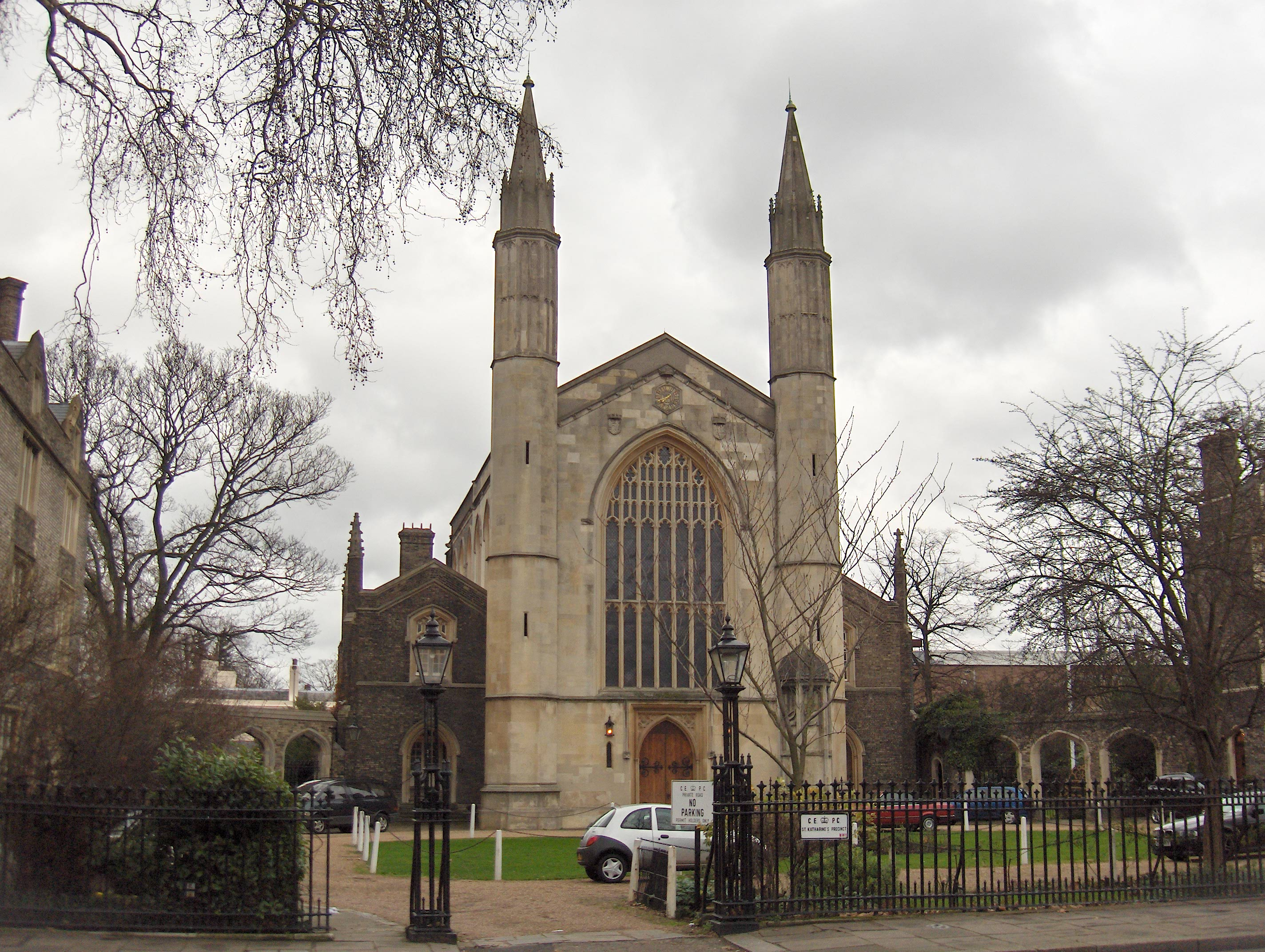
Danish Church in London

The Danish Church Abroad / Danish Seamen's Church (Danish: Danske Sømands- og Udlandskirker, literally: "Danish Seamen's and Abroad Churches") is a Protestant church. It was founded 1 January 2004 as the result of a fusion between the Danish Church Abroad and the Danish Seamen's Church in foreign ports. It was established to help Danes travelling abroad, particularly seafarers and migrant workers.

There are 53 Danish seamen's and overseas churches around the world. Several operate on a Scandinavian basis with Swedish and Norwegian churches. The Danish Church in Southern Schleswig belongs to the church.

The Danish Church Abroad / Danish Seamen's Church is working on an Evangelical-Lutheran foundation and in affiliation with the Evangelical-Lutheran Church in Denmark in Denmark. This has been partially done by assigning each pastor with a bishop of the national church: the bishop of Copenhagen supervises the churches in Europe as well as overseas sailors' churches, the bishop of Haderslev oversees the church in Southern Schleswig, and the bishop of Funen Diocese oversees the churches in Thailand, Argentina, Australia and Canada.

== Danish churches abroad ==
=== Asia ===
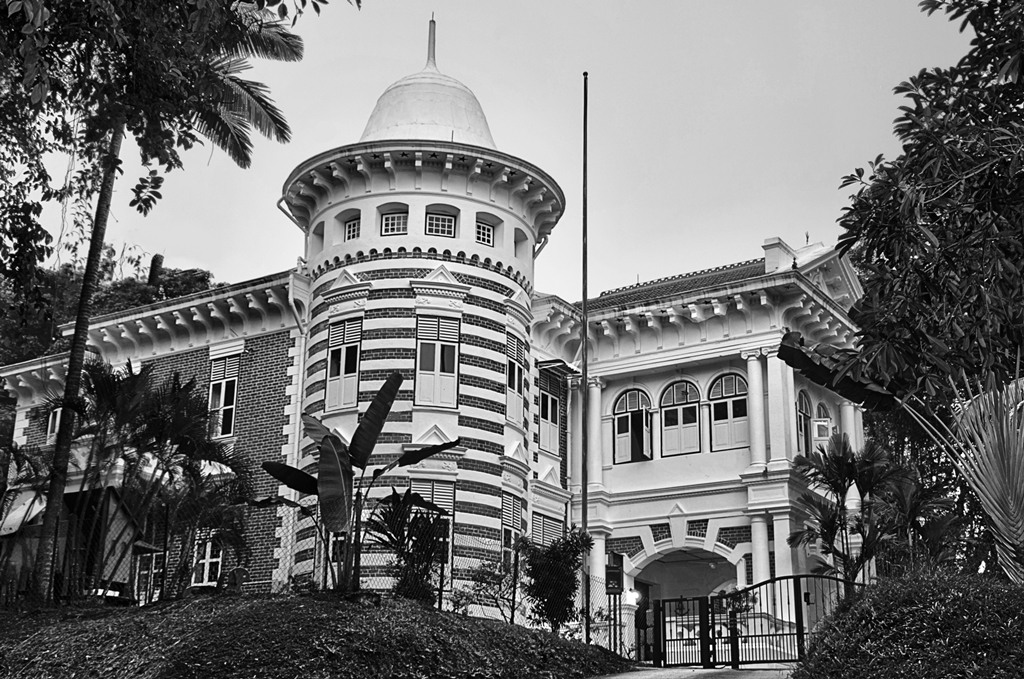
The Danish Seamen's Church on Mount Faber in Singapore

- Hong Kong, China
- Jerusalem
- Pelepas, Malaysia
- Singapore

=== Europe ===
- Algeciras, Spain
- Berlin, Germany
- Brussels, Belgium
- Fuengirola, Spain
- Geneva, Switzerland
- Gothenburg, Sweden
- Hamburg, Germany
- Hull, UK
- London, UK
- Luxembourg, Luxembourg
- Paris, France
- Rotterdam, Netherlands
- Costa del Sol, Spain

=== North America ===
- Calgary, Alberta, Canada
- Edmonton, Alberta, Canada
- Grimsby, Ontario, Canada
- New York City, United States
- Surrey, British Columbia, Canada
- Toronto, Ontario, Canada
- Vancouver, British Columbia, Canada

=== Oceania ===
- Dunedin, New Zealand
- Sydney, Australia

=== South America ===
- Buenos Aires, Argentina
- Necochea, Argentina
- Tandil, Argentina
- Tres Arroyos, Argentina

== Former locations ==
- China 1910s–1950s: Lüshun Lutheran Church, Dalian Lutheran Church, and others

== See also ==
- Church of Sweden Abroad (Svenska kyrkan i utlandet)
- Finnish Seamen's Mission (Finlands Sjömanskyrka)
- Scandinavian churches in London
- Norwegian Seamen’s Churches (Norske Sjømannskirken)
