= Norwegian Seamen's Church (Los Angeles) =

Church in Los Angeles, California

Coordinates: 33°44′4″N 118°16′51″W

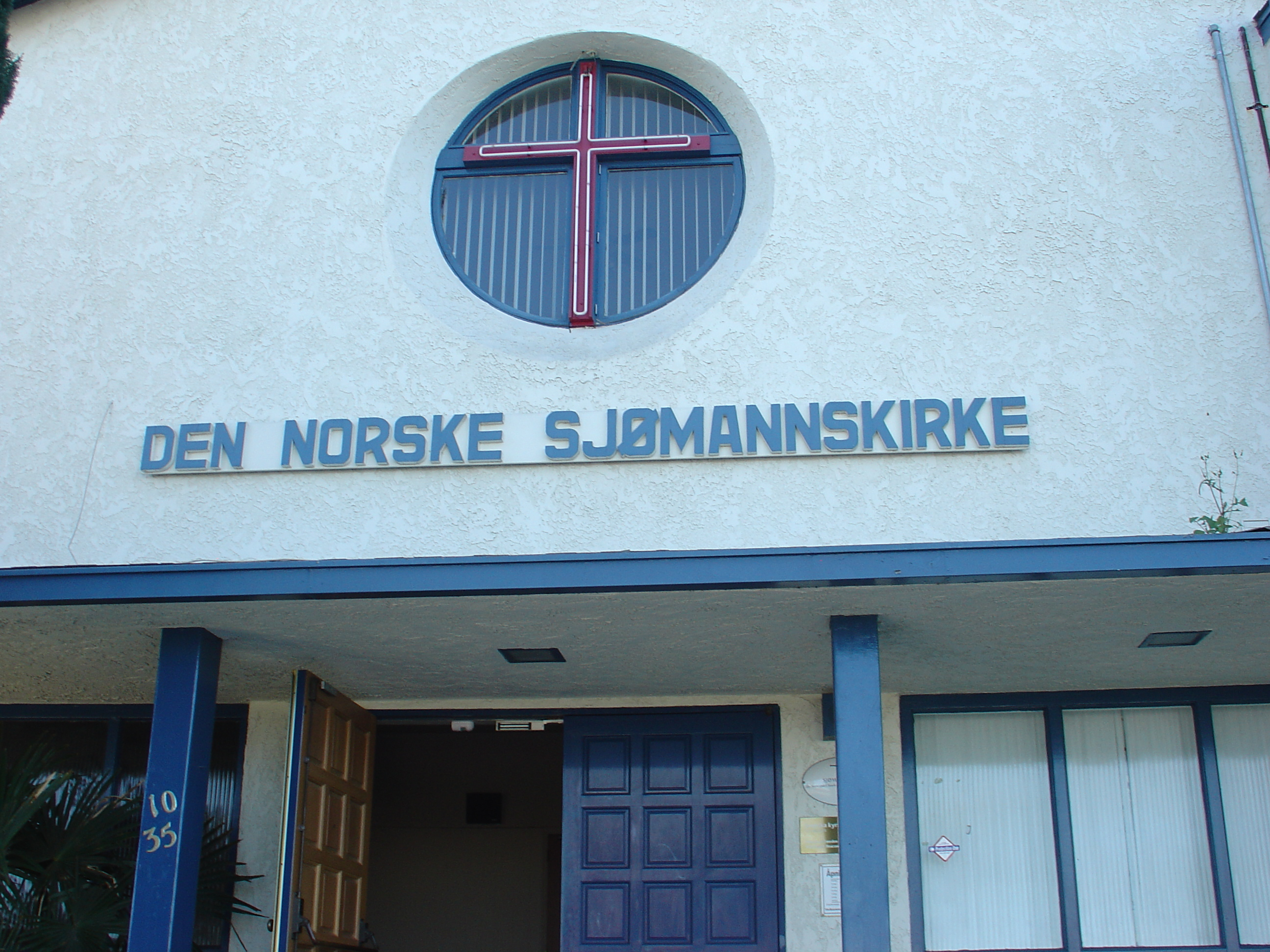
Norwegian Seamen's Church, San Pedro entryway

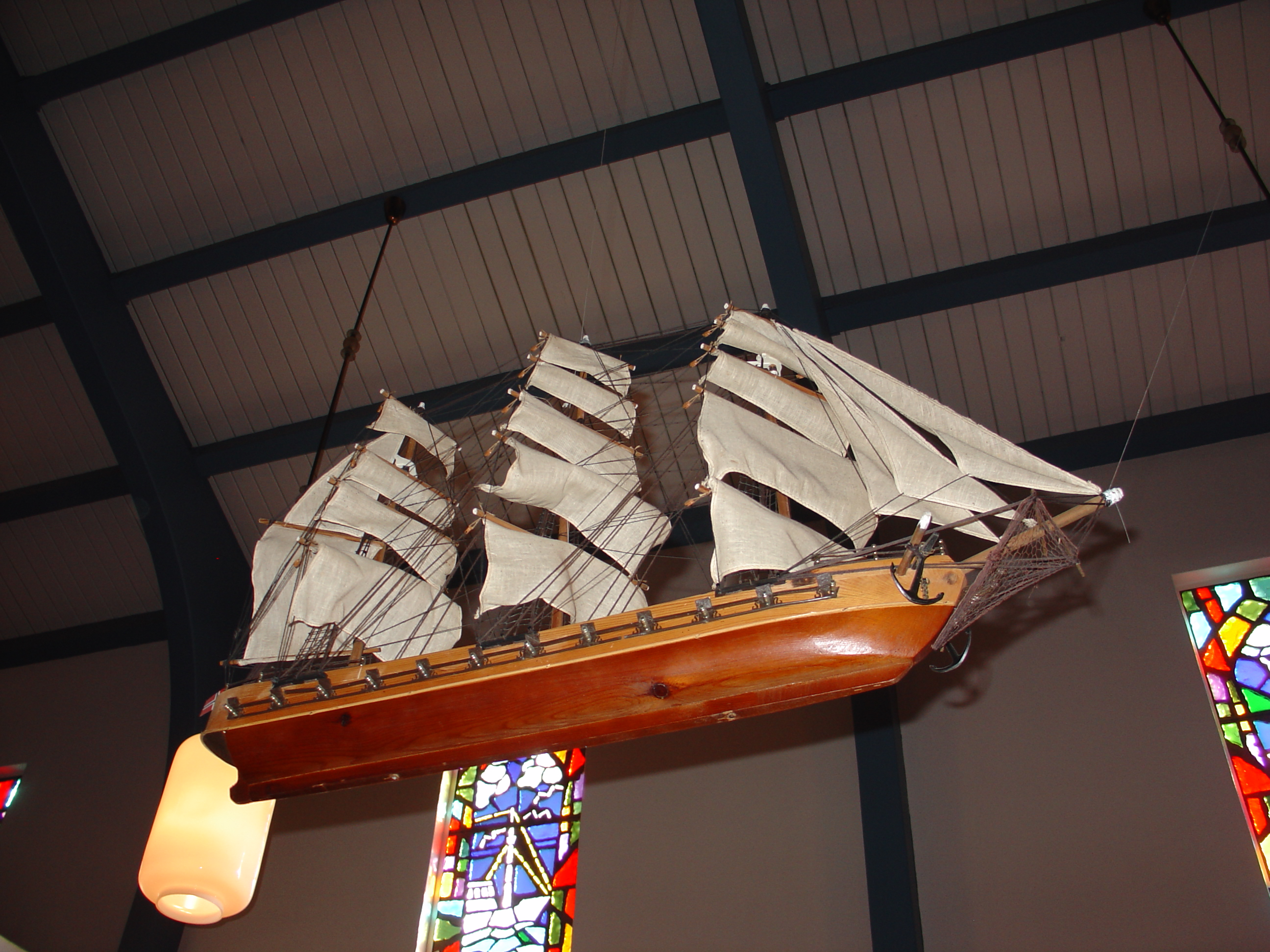
A ship hangs from the rafters of interior with nautical themed stained glass windows in background

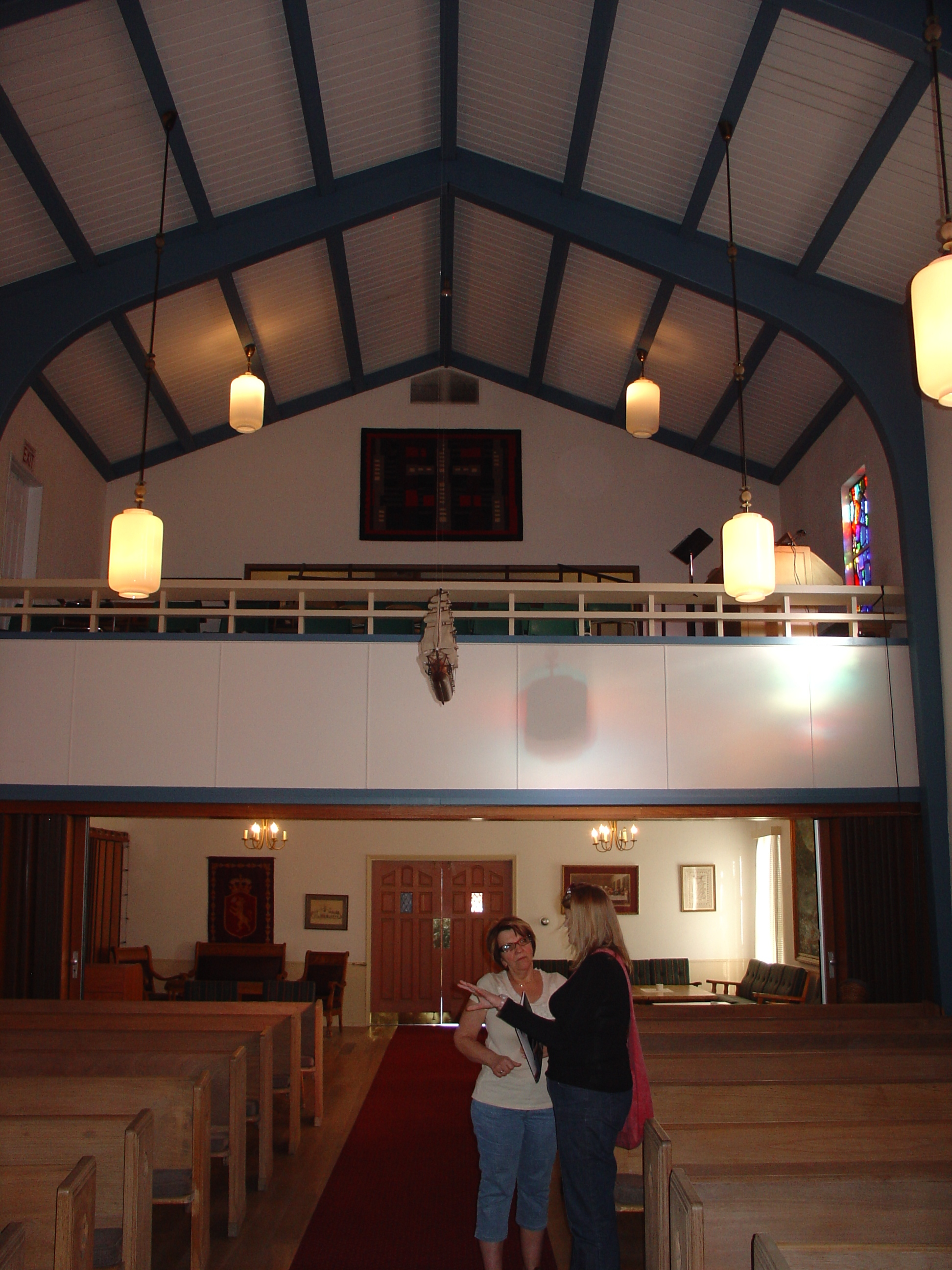
Interior

The Norwegian Seamen's Church (Norwegian: Den norske sjømannskirke) is a Norwegian Church Abroad that doubles as the Church of Sweden Los Angeles (Swedish: Svenska kyrkan Los Angeles), also known as the Swedish Seamen's Church. It is located at 1035 South Beacon Street in the San Pedro area of Los Angeles, California and is also part of the Church of Sweden Abroad (Swedish: Svenska kyrkan i utlandet). A print on the wall of the lounge area shows an architectural painting indicating Kemper Nomland as the architect.

The Norwegian church was founded by Elbjørg Amundsen Baardsen and her husband Sig. It opened in 1946 and in 1951 moved to its present location at 1035 South Beacon Street. The building cost $80,000 to complete. Since 1952 there has also been a Swedish staff at the church, and a Swedish service takes place once every month. Lutheran baptisms, confirmations, weddings, and funerals are performed at the Norwegian Seamen's Church, but the church is open to everyone and not only to Lutherans.

The Norwegian Seamen's Church provides a place for Swedes and Norwegians who are away from the homeland. Since it is located in a harbor area, it serves many people involved in the shipping business. The church gets visits from around 160 Norwegian ships every year, often with one to fifteen Norwegian crew members per ship.

The Norwegian Seamen's Church, which attracts around 15,000 visitors each year, is also visited by Norwegian descendants living in the area, and by several of the thousands of Norwegian inhabitants in Los Angeles. The Norwegian Seamen's Church is the closest connection to Norway for many of these people. The church has regular contact with 500–1,000 families, and sends its newsletter to around 2000 families. There is a school at the church where adults and children can learn Norwegian.
