= Case Study House No. 10 =

Historic house in Pasadena, California

- U.S. National Register of Historic Places
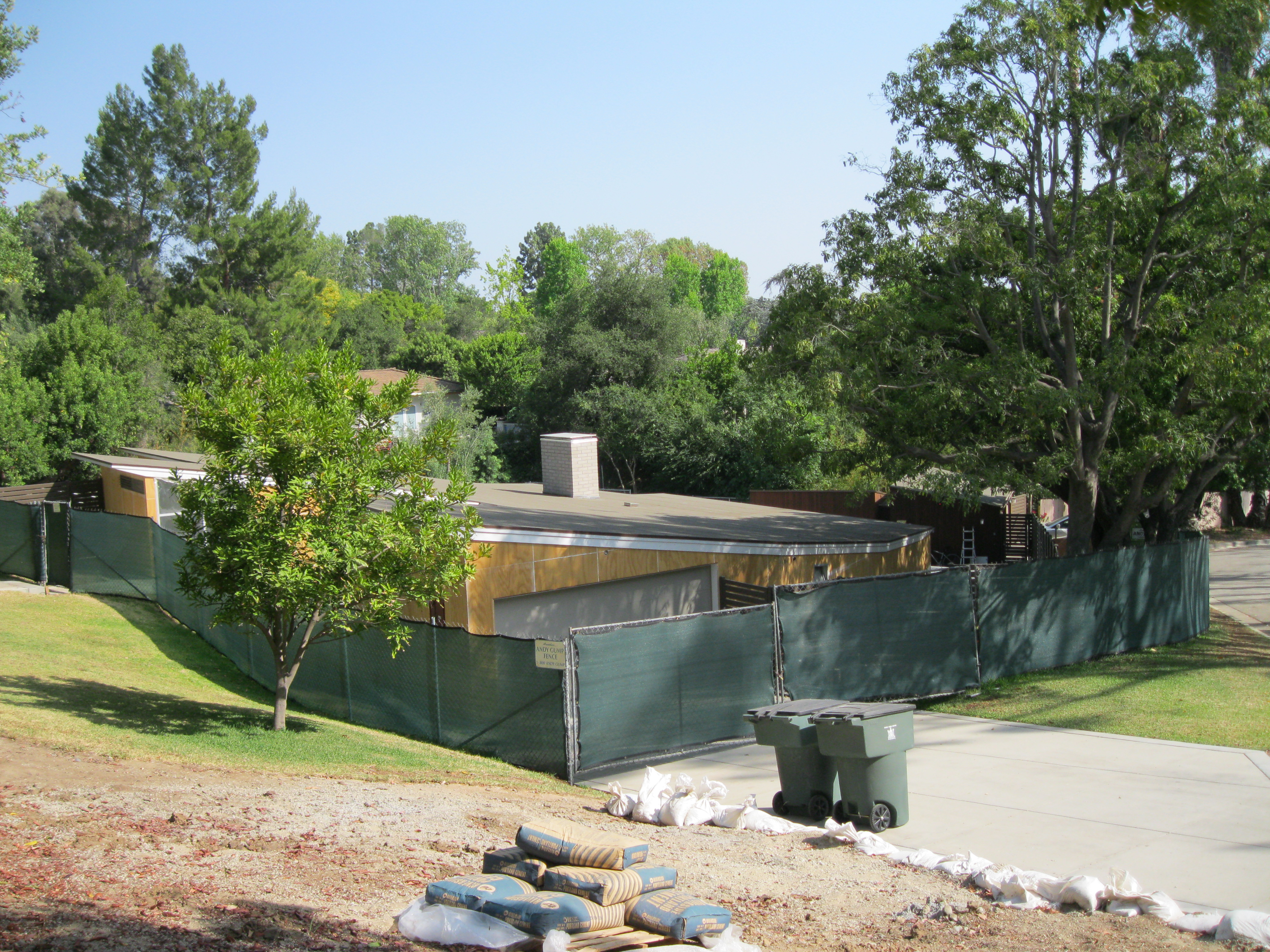
- The house undergoing renovations in 2013
- Location: 711 San Rafael Avenue, Pasadena, California
- Coordinates: 34.1312506832976°N 118.17025620456587°W
- Architect: Kemper Nomland, Kemper Nomland Jr.
- Architectural style: Modernist
- NRHP reference No.: 13000514
- Added to NRHP: June 7, 2013

Case Study House No. 10 is a modernist house in Pasadena, California, US, constructed in 1947. The house was designed by architect Kemper Nomland and his son Kemper Nomland Jr. Although not originally part of the Case Study House program, House No. 10 replaced an originally planned (but unbuilt) example as it exemplified the project's goals of showcasing modern and low-cost building techniques.

Built on a sloping corner lot, the home consists of three levels of wood post and beam framing over a concrete slab and expansive glass windows. House No. 10 integrated the existing landscape more than other Case Study designs. Unlike other Case Study houses, it was designed for a childless family, with fewer buffers between living and sleeping space. A garage and studio occupy the first level, bed and guest rooms on the second, and kitchen and lounge with large sliding windows open to surrounding eucalyptus trees on the lowest level.

An addition designed by Nomland Jr. was added to the lower level in 1968. The site was added to the National Register of Historic Places in 2013. The home was renovated that year, winning a City of Pasadena Historic Preservation award in 2015. Actress and comedian Kristen Wiig bought the home in 2017, reselling it in 2021 to actress Lily Collins for $3.9 million. Collins resold the house in 2025 for $6 million.

== See also ==
- National Register of Historic Places listings in Pasadena, California
