= Wyeth, Oregon =

Unincorporated community in the state of Oregon, United States

Coordinates: 45°41′26″N 121°46′11″W

Wyeth is an unincorporated locale in Hood River County, Oregon, United States. It is the site of a campground area in the Columbia River Gorge National Scenic Area off Interstate 84 (I-84).

It was a railway station and had a post office between 1901 and 1936. It was named after explorer Nathaniel J. Wyeth, builder of Fort Hall (today's Pocatello, Idaho) and the Fort William trading post on Sauvie Island. The area is now home to the Wyeth State Recreation Area.

Wyeth is located 51 miles east of Portland at exit #51 of I-84, and 1/4 mile west on Herman Creek Road. It is a trailhead for Wyeth Trail #411, the Gorge Trail #400, and Gorton Creek Falls.

== History ==
Wyeth was an early settlement site. It became the site of a Civilian Conservation Corps (CCC) camp in the 1930s. In the 1940s, it was the site of Camp 21, a Civilian Public Service camp for Conscientious Objectors that took over the abandoned CCC facility during World War II. Residents of the camp included architect Kemper Nomland, actor Lew Ayres, politician George Brown, Jr., and actor, director and playwright Kermit Sheets.
