= Kemper Nomland =

American architect

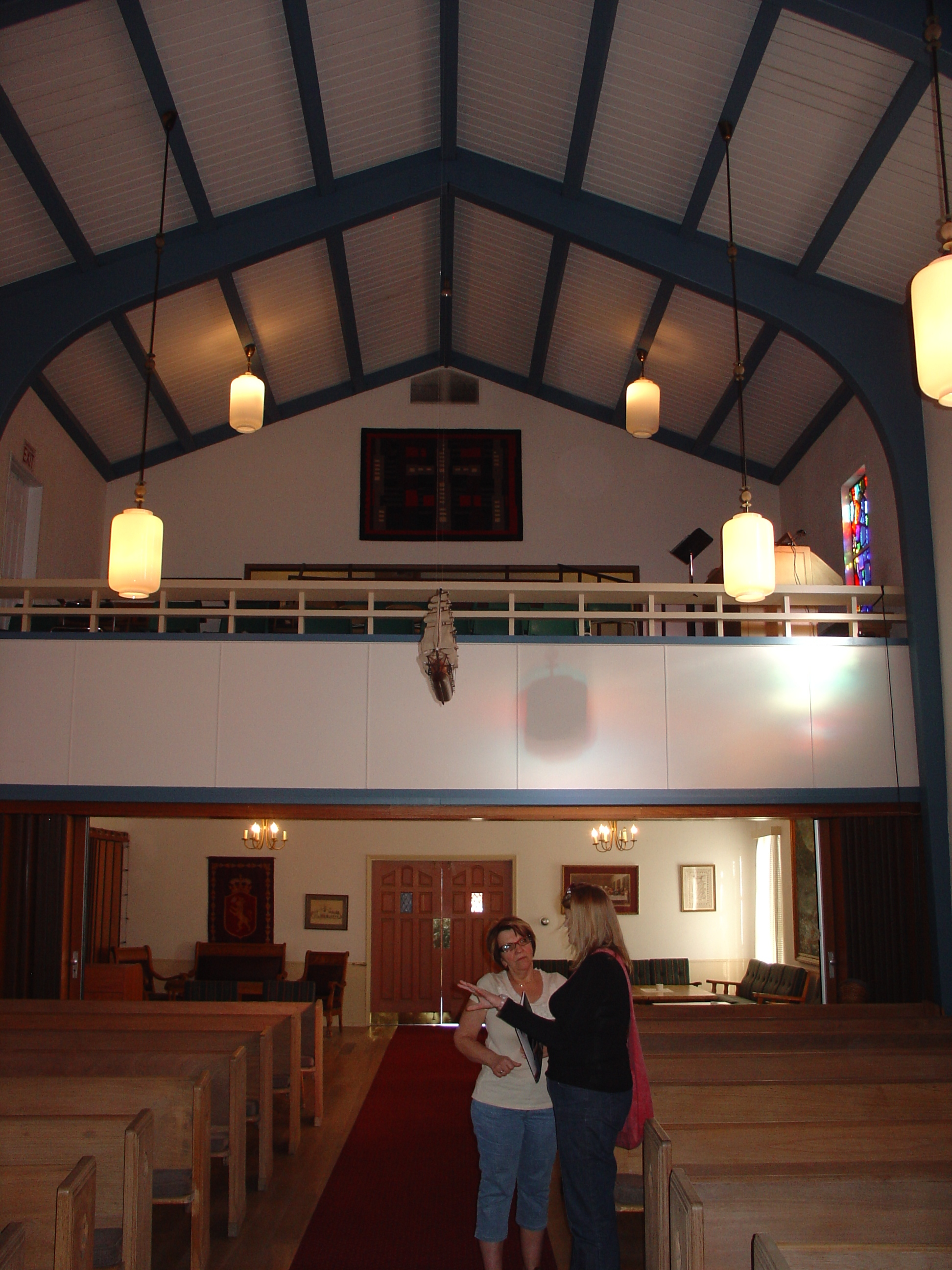
Norwegian Seamen's Church, San Pedro

Kemper Nomland Jr. (May 8, 1919 - December 25, 2009) was a modernist architect in Los Angeles, California and part of a father-son architectural team with his father Kemper Nomland, Sr. He was also a painter and printer of poetry and arts publications.

== Family ==
Kemper Nomland Jr. was the son of Kemper Nomland Sr. (1892- 1976) and Elgie (Barrington) Nomland (1892-1996) . He had one younger brother, Dr. John Nomland.

Kemper Nomland Sr. was born in Buxton, North Dakota to Norwegian immigrant parents who had lived in rural Traill County, North Dakota. After completing coursework at the University of North Dakota, Kemper Nomland Sr. studied architecture at Columbia University before practicing in New York City, Seattle, and then Los Angeles. He worked with Albert C. Martin in 1922, Marston Van Pelt & Maybury (1923–1925) Austin, Martin & Parkinson (1926–1927); Kemper Nomland Jr. after 1928; and Hunt & Chambers from 1942-1944.

== Studies and work camp ==
Kemper Nomland Jr. graduated from Pasadena City College in 1938 and with a bachelor's degree in architecture from the University of Southern California in 1941. He worked for Albert C. Martin before joining his father to form a firm together.

He was a conscientious objector during World War II and was put to work in a Civilian Public Service camp at Wyeth, Oregon, (CPS Camp 21) in the Pacific Northwest, where he did forest-maintenance work, and Camp Angel, near Waldport, Oregon, "where he was involved with the fine arts group, designing several covers for books printed by the Untide Press at the camp and working on Illiterati, a literary and artistic journal". He designed the chapel at Camp 21 in the Columbia River Gorge on Gorton Creek in Wyeth, Oregon, "a few miles east of Cascade Locks."

Seven of his framed paintings, including portraits from his time at the work camp, are held in a collection at Lewis and Clark College. One of his paintings was published in two of Coffield's books as well as the publication The Illiterati. Subjects of the paintings included Glen Coffield, Windsor Utley, Bill Webb, a waterfall, concert, and (from 1968) an anti-war rally. He also painted a portrait of Mark Schrock, the director of CPS Camp 21. Nomland was also involved in printing work with William Everson and provided the illustrations for William Everson's War Elegies. He also wrote to E.E. Cummings.

== Architectural work ==
Together with his father, Nomland designed Case Study House No. 10 in 1947 in Pasadena. The project was part of a program sponsored by the magazine Arts & Architecture which promoted the design of modernist postwar housing. The home on a sloping corner lot "in the hillside neighborhood" "mirrored the descending line of the home’s site into the sloping roofline" and included "large walls of glass and a heated floor system" and used "industrial materials such as plywood and corrugated wire glass were also used throughout and the architects further specified large openings to the outside, which allowed for the fluid layout of interior spaces to be carried to the outdoors."

In 1950 he moved to Mt. Washington section of Los Angeles and designed his own three-story hillside home, and about a dozen other nearby homes. He resided there with other pacifist friends and neighbors until his wife inability to get around well. Nomland also designed the Norwegian Seamen's Church, San Pedro. During the campus' expansion during the 1950s, he refurbished UCLA's Moore Hall, including lighting work when it was converted to exclusive use by the University's School of Education.

After working with his father for several years he joined "several architectural firms, and at one point he designed a house for actress Jane Russell" and designed at least a dozen other residence.

== Personal life ==
His first wife, Ella Kube Nomland (1914-1994) had been an immigrant from Germany. He was later married to Joan Westermeyer. Kemper Nomland Jr. died of natural causes while residing at an assisted living home in Long Beach, leaving behind a daughter, Erika Nomland Cilengir, a son-in-law, Erol Cilengir, and a grandson, Kemal Antonio Cilengir.

== Selected Projects ==
- Case Study House No. 10 (1947) by Kemper Nomland and Kemper Nomland Jr.
- West Hollywood house at 1030 North Kings Road (Unfortunately, this house has been demolished and replaced by an apartment building.)
- French Normandy style residence at 3635 Shannon Road (This residence was actually designed by Kemper Nomland, Sr., not Kemper Nomland, Jr.) in Los Feliz.
- Norwegian Seamen's Church, San Pedro (1951)
- 1680 Virginia Rd. Los Angeles, CA built in 1961 and located in historic LaFayette Square.
