= Norwegian Seamen's Church (New York City) =

Church in Manhattan, New York

Coordinates: 40°45.35′0″N 73°58.00′0″W

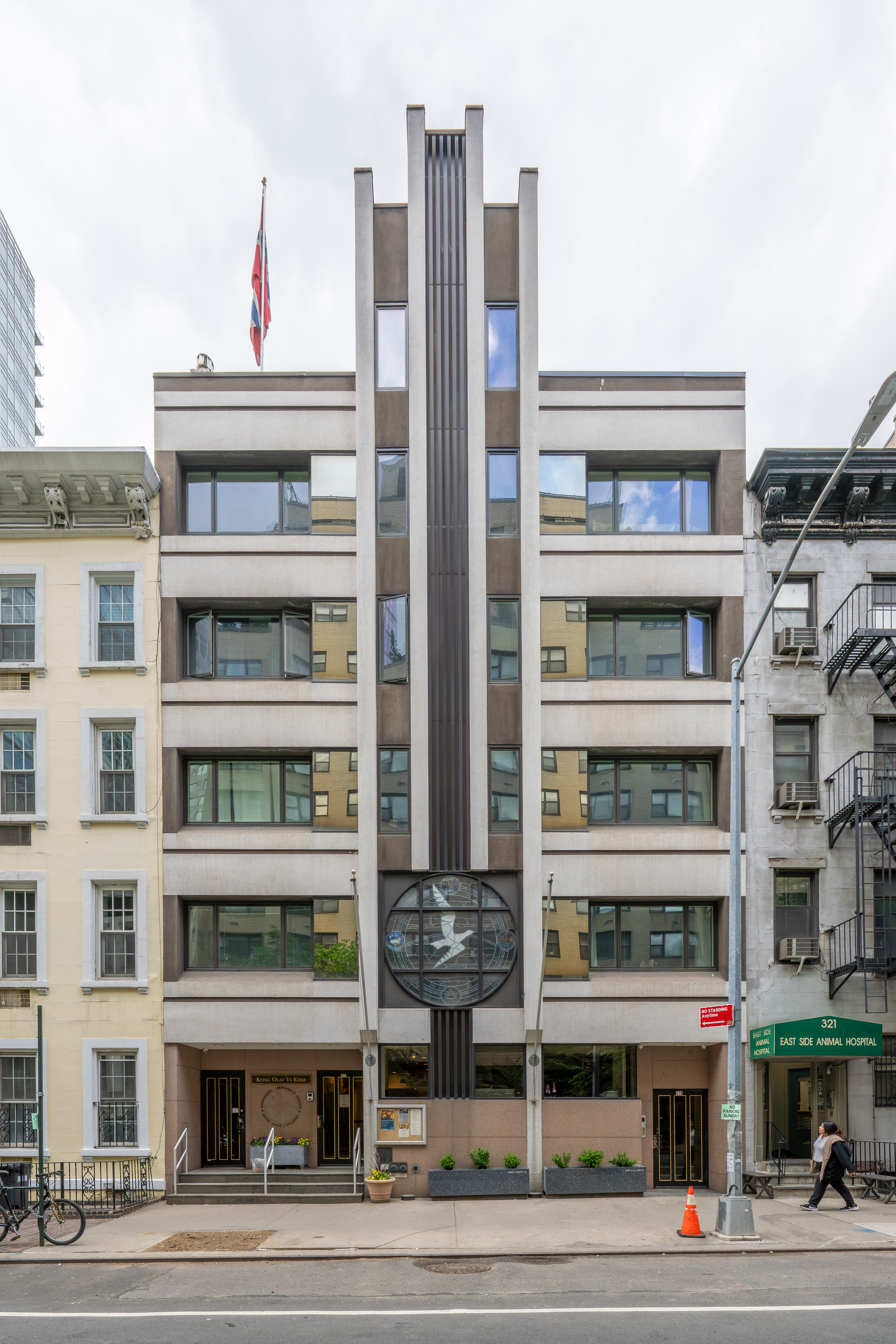
Sjømannskirken in New York

The Norwegian Seamen's Church in New York (Norwegian: Sjømannskirken i New York) is a Lutheran church serving Norwegian sailors, residents, and visitors in the greater New York City area. The church is located in 317 East 52nd Street on the east side of Manhattan in New York City. It was once located in Carroll Gardens.

The church is a part of Norwegian Church Abroad within the Church of Norway. Founded in 1864, The Norwegian Church Abroad was established to secure the moral and religious education of Scandinavian seafarers. The church has been working in New York City since 1878. It has been in the present building from 1992. The church is a well-established religious, social and cultural meeting point for Norwegians in America. A guest room in the top floor is rented out to tourists and others.

== Activities ==
- Church services, mostly in Norwegian language
- Confirmation in the Lutheran church
- Meetings for students, au pairs and other young people
- Norwegian language courses

== Trygve Lie Gallery ==
The church runs its own art gallery, Trygve Lie Gallery, which has exhibited a number of leading Norwegian and Scandinavian artists. In addition to exhibiting art and documentary projects, the gallery space is used for recitals, conferences, and performances.
