= Windsor Utley =

American painter

Windsor Utley (1920 – 8 April 1989) was an American musician, artist, teacher and gallery owner, closely associated with the painter Mark Tobey.

== Life and career ==
Utley was born in Laguna, California in 1920. He graduated from the Choate School in Connecticut, and attended Pomona College and the University of Southern California. Utley was a classically trained flautist who performed with the Tacoma Symphony in Washington in the early 1940s, and continued to teach and perform throughout his life. He did not begin painting until he was 19 years old. During World War II, as a conscientious objector Utley was an inmate of the Cascade Locks, Oregon, Civilian Public Service camp, where he created several paintings and was himself painted by fellow-inmate Kemper Nomland.

After the war, Utley was accepted into Northwest Annual in 1945 where he met and was greatly influenced by Mark Tobey. The Smithsonian has a collection of 28 letters and 36 postcards sent to Utley from Mark Tobey and his companion Pehr Hallsten written in 1954 and 1955 while Tobey and Hallsten were travelling in Europe. A handwritten letter from Tobey to Utley dated 1959 is also preserved in the Smithsonian Archives of American Art. Utley taught at The Helen Bush School, and later became the head of the art department at Cornish College of the Arts in Seattle.

Windsor Utley has been celebrated as a member of the Northwest School, but lived at times in California, Washington, New York, Canada, and Italy. He exhibited his paintings throughout the United States and Canada. Utley moved to Sienna, Italy in 1951, and during his year there was deeply inspired by the local art, culture, and architecture. Throughout his life he returned to Italy for extended stays, painting and exhibiting. He opened Utley's Art Galleries in Seattle in 1966, then in Victoria, British Columbia in the 1970s. He moved the galleries to Laguna Beach, California in 1983 and re-opened them in Seattle in 1987.

Windsor Utley died in Seattle on 8 April 1989 aged 69. His work is in many private and public collections including the Seattle Art Museum, British Columbia Provincial Collection, Victoria, Duveen-Graham Gallery, New York, Virginia Museum of Fine Arts, Richmond and the University of Washington.
