= Norwegian Church Abroad =

Religious organization serving Scandinavians traveling abroad

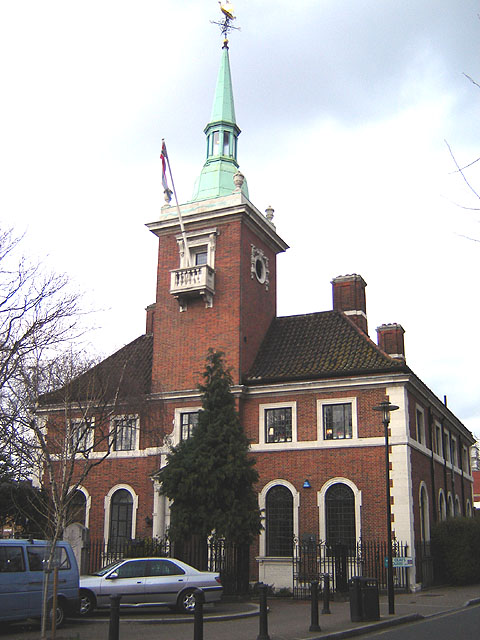
St. Olav's Church, Rotherhithe, London

The Norwegian Church Abroad or the Norwegian Seamen’s Church, also referred to by its Norwegian name Sjømannskirken (Norwegian pronunciation: [ʂøːmɑnːsçɪrkən]), is a religious organization serving Norwegians and other Scandinavians travelling abroad. Founded in 1864, the Norwegian Seamen's Mission – Sjømannsmisjonen – was established to secure the moral and religious education of Scandinavian seafarers, but also to give them a "breathing room" where a fellow countryman was available to lend an ear and give some attention. The churches and their staff together with travelling pastors around the globe represent a "resource center" for all Norwegians travelling internationally.

Sjømannskirken annually serves around 700 thousand Norwegians through over 30 churches and 16 mobile services in 30 countries around the world. Several churches operate in Scandinavia. The Norwegian Church Abroad is a charitable organization supported by the Church of Norway and the Norwegian government. Sjømannskirken is also a member of the ICMA and the Council of Nordic Seamen's Missions. With its main office in Bergen, it is under episcopal supervision.

For most Norwegians travelling abroad, Sjømannskirken is a place to rest: one can read newspapers from home, buy Norwegian food and speak to other Norwegians. Many Norwegians living permanently abroad use the seamen's churches instead of a local church.

== Locations ==
=== Africa ===
- Africa, travelling mission in Africa south of Sahara
- Gran Canaria, Spain
- Lanzarote, Spain
- Tenerife, Spain

=== Asia ===
- Azerbaijan, Travelling mission
- Dubai, United Arab Emirates
- East Asia, Travelling mission
- Pattaya, Thailand
- Phuket, Thailand
- Singapore
- South Asia, Travelling mission in South and South-East Asia

=== Europe ===
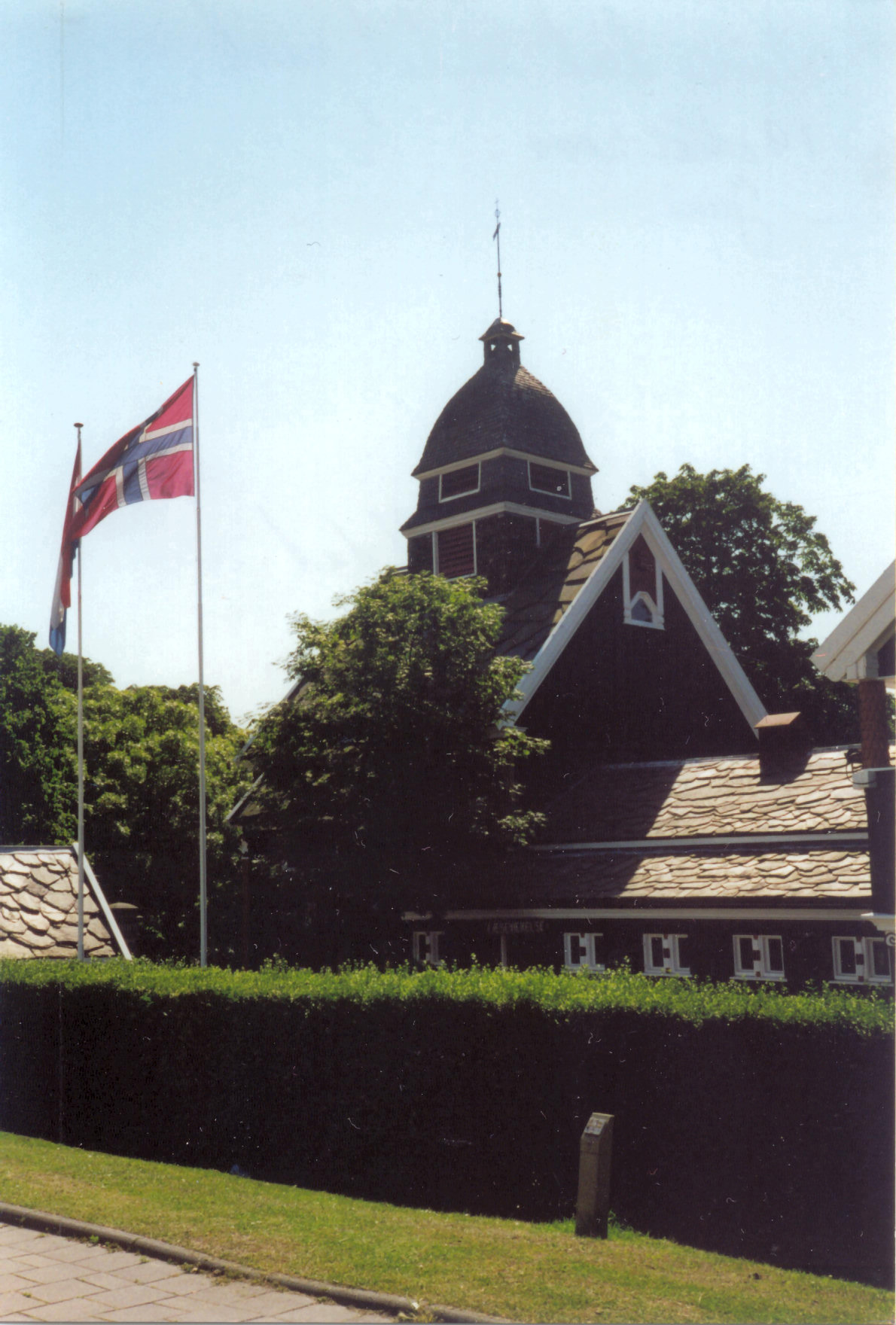
Norwegian Church in Rotterdam, the Netherlands

- Alicante, Spain
- Antwerp, Belgium
- Ayia Napa, Cyprus
- Barcelona, Spain, travelling mission from the permanent church in Mallorca
- Berlin, Germany
- Brussels, Belgium
- Norwegian Church, Cardiff, United Kingdom (closed and de-consecrated in 1974)
- Copenhagen, Denmark
- Costa del Sol, Spain – five locations
- Edinburgh, travelling mission for Scotland, United Kingdom
- Gothenburg, Sweden
- Hamburg, Germany
- Norwegian Fishermans' Church, Liverpool, United Kingdom. Grade II listed building on Southwood Road, Aigburth. Closed 2002.
- London (St Olav's Church), United Kingdom
- Torrenova in Mallorca, Spain
- Moscow, Russia
- Paris, France
- Pireus, Greece

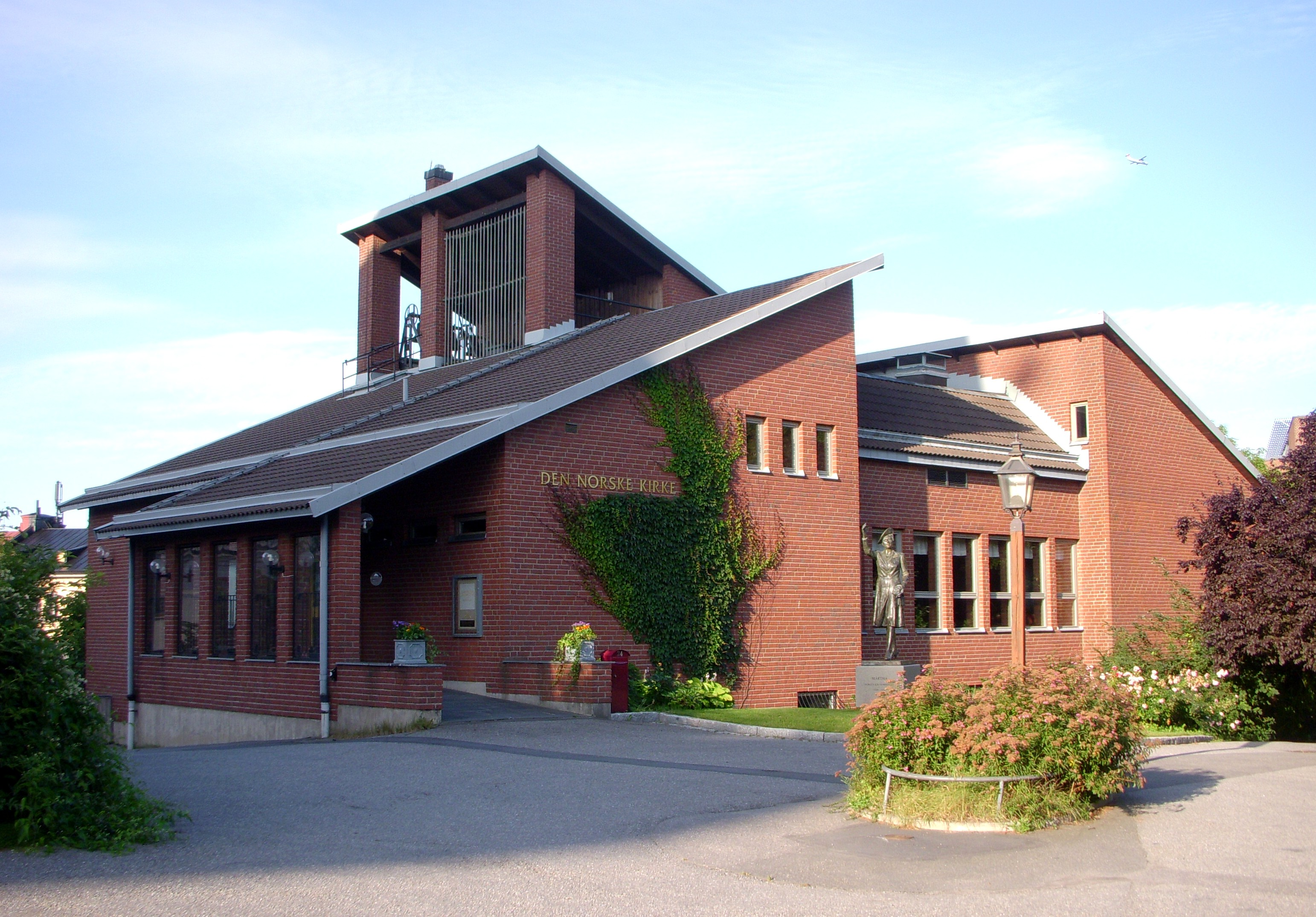
Kronprinsesse Märthas kirke, the Norwegian Church in Stockholm, Sweden

- Stockholm, Sweden
- Rotterdam, Netherlands
- Switzerland, ambulant, with office in Meyrin
- Torrevieja, Spain

=== North America ===
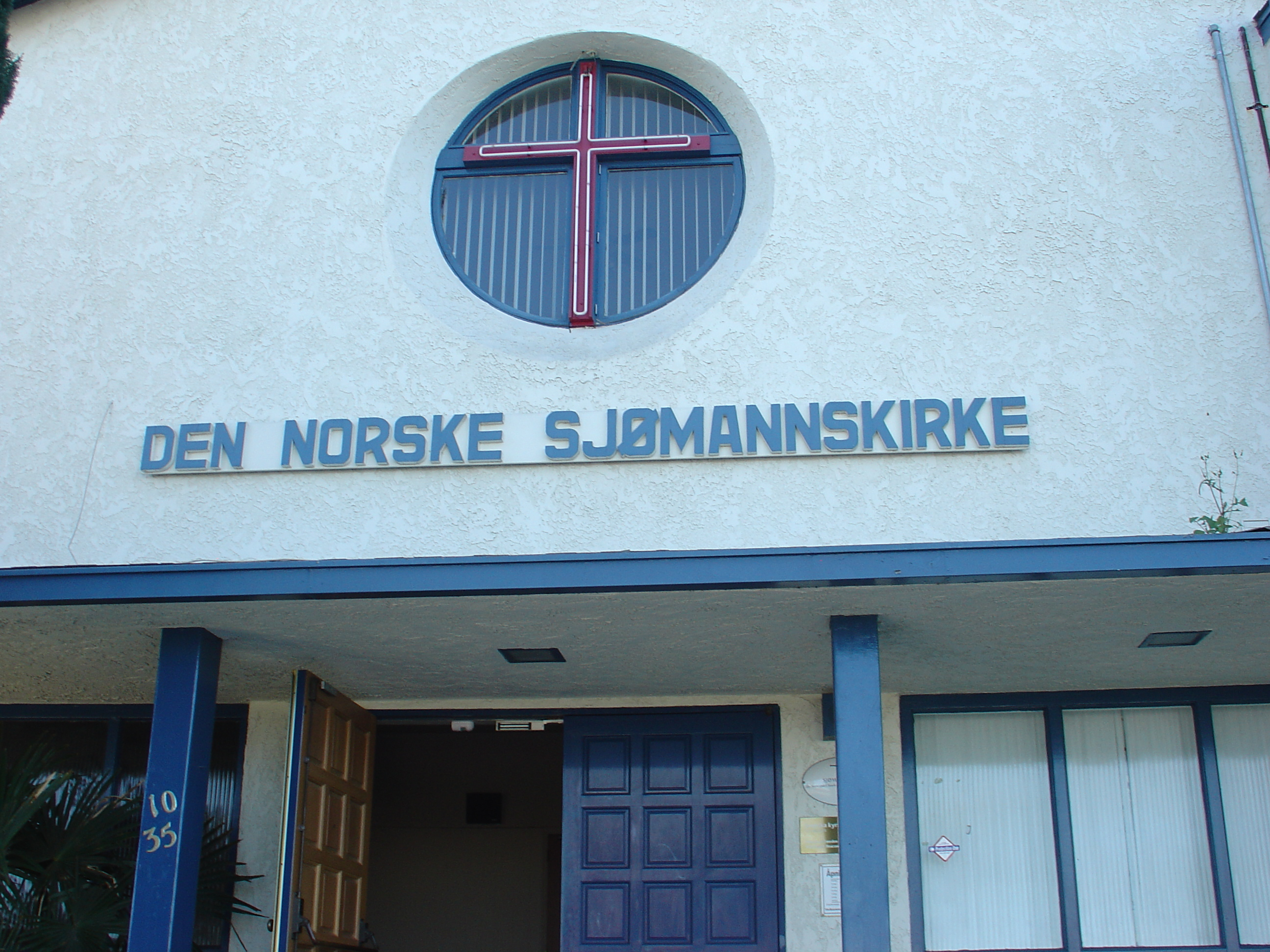
Norwegian Seamen's Church, San Pedro, California

- Houston, United States
- Los Angeles, United States (see Norwegian Seamen's Church, San Pedro)
- Miami, United States There has been a Norwegian Seamen's church in Miami since the early 1980s. In November 2011, Crown Princess Mette-Marit opened a new building for the church. The church was built as a center for the 10,000 Scandinavians that live in Florida. Around 4,000 of them are Norwegian. The church is also an important place for the 150 Norwegians that work at Disney World.
- Montreal, Canada (closed in 1994)
- New Orleans, United States Church closed in 2016, now owned by a holistic health center.
- New York City, United States (see The Norwegian Seamen's Church in New York)
- San Francisco, United States
- Vancouver, Canada
- Church services in Washington, D.C., United States

=== Oceania ===
- Sydney – the base for a travelling mission serving all of Australia and New Zealand

=== South America ===
- Rio de Janeiro, Brazil

=== Other ===
There is also a special travelling mission for workers in the North Sea and one for students in most parts of the world.

== Notable former churches ==
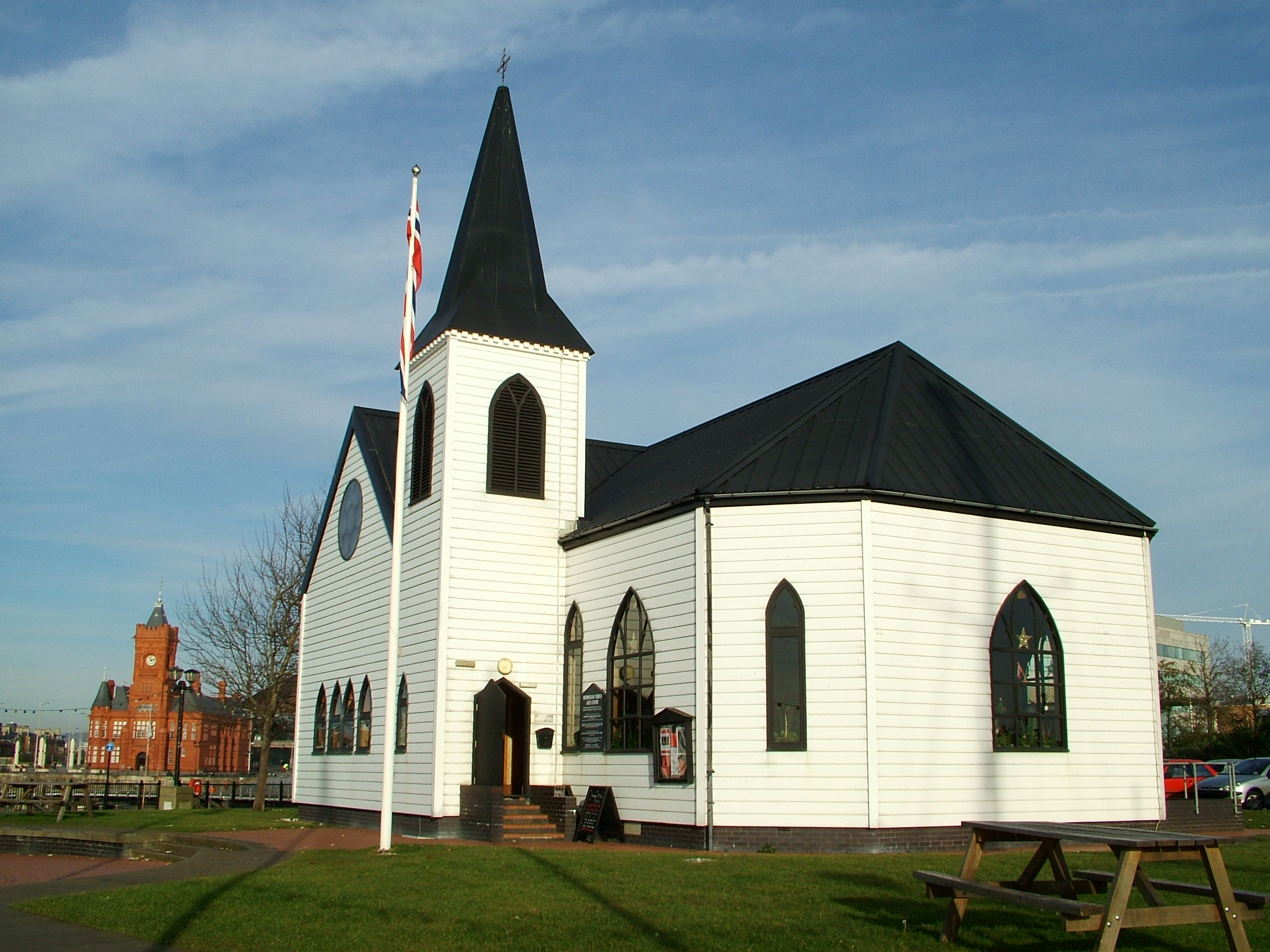
The Norwegian Church in Cardiff, Wales, now an arts centre

- Norwegian Seamen's Church, Leith, Scotland
- Norwegian Church, Cardiff, Wales
- Norwegian Seamen's Church, Baltimore, Maryland, United States
- Norwegian Seamen's Church, Halifax, Nova Scotia, Canada
- Norwegian Seamen's Church, Montréal, Québec, Canada
- Norwegian Seamen's Church, Pensacola, Florida, United States
- Norwegian Church, Swansea, Wales

== See also ==
- Harald V of Norway (patron)
- Apostleship of the Sea
- British & International Sailors’ Society
- Danish Seamen's Church and Church Abroad
- Church of Sweden Abroad
- Finnish Seamen's Mission
- International Christian Maritime Association
- Scandinavian churches in London
- Seamen's Church Institute of Newport
- Seamen's Church Institute of New York and New Jersey
