= Norwegian Church, Swansea =

Church in Swansea, Wales

Coordinates: 51.620°N 3.919°W

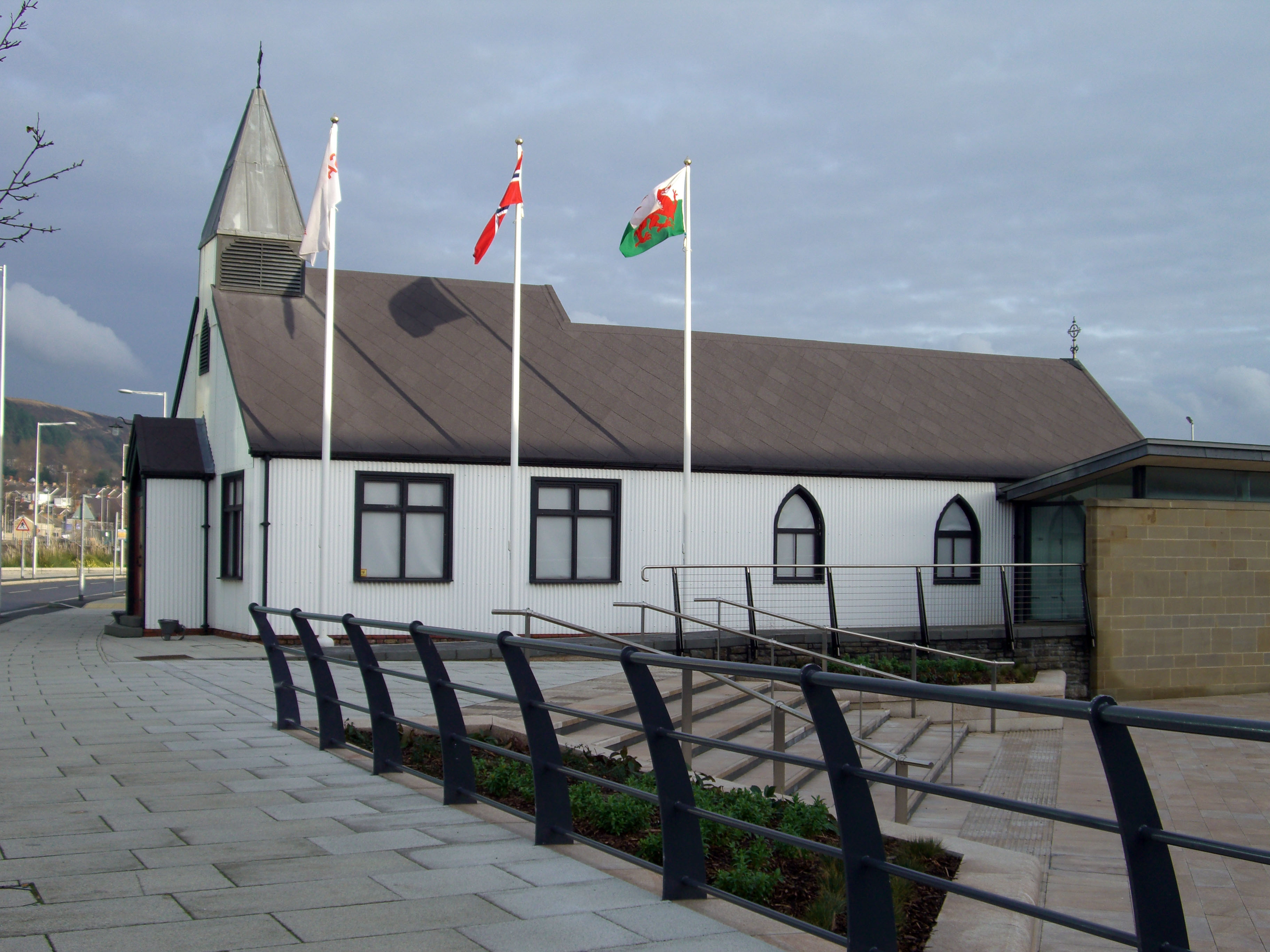
The Norwegian Church in 2007

The Norwegian Church was a church for Norwegian sailors originally located in Newport, but later relocated to the docklands area of Swansea, Wales. It was a Grade II listed building.

== History ==
The church building was originally located at Newport Docks. The building consists of a Seaman’s Mission to the west end and a single gothic church to the east end. It was originally built as a place of worship for Norwegian sailors when they visited the UK. It was relocated from Newport to Swansea in 1910 at a site directly opposite the Sainsbury's supermarket on the River Tawe.

In 1966 the Norwegian Seamen's Mission in Bergen told the last minister, Pastor Somerset, to abandon the Mission and return to Norway. However, a Norwegian who had settled in Swansea, Eric Benneche, wrote to the Bishop of Bergen offering to run the church from the expatriate community's own resources. Permission was granted and the Bishop visited the church in person to present them with the key. Benneche was also allowed to officiate as a lay pastor at services, christenings, weddings and funerals.

Benneche was followed, in 1968, by the Reverend Vivian James (1927–2011), who kept the church going for a further thirty years. He had been a missionary to Lapland, Norway from 1953 to 1967 and preached in both English and Norwegian. When Pastor James retired in 1998 the church was the last working Seamen's Mission Church. It closed in 1998.

With the redevelopment of the district, the building had to be relocated again. In 2004 the building was dismantled and reassembled next to Swansea's Prince of Wales dock where it later reopened as a jewellery gallery, and later as a nursery. It sits alongside two other historic listed buildings – the Ice House and J Shed.

== See also ==
- Norwegian Church, Cardiff
