= Nordic churches in London =

Type of Christian church in London

There are several long-established Nordic churches in London. All seek to provide Lutheran Christian worship and pastoral care to their respective national communities in their own languages. Many of the churches also organise language classes and organise a wide range of social activities.

== Danish Church ==
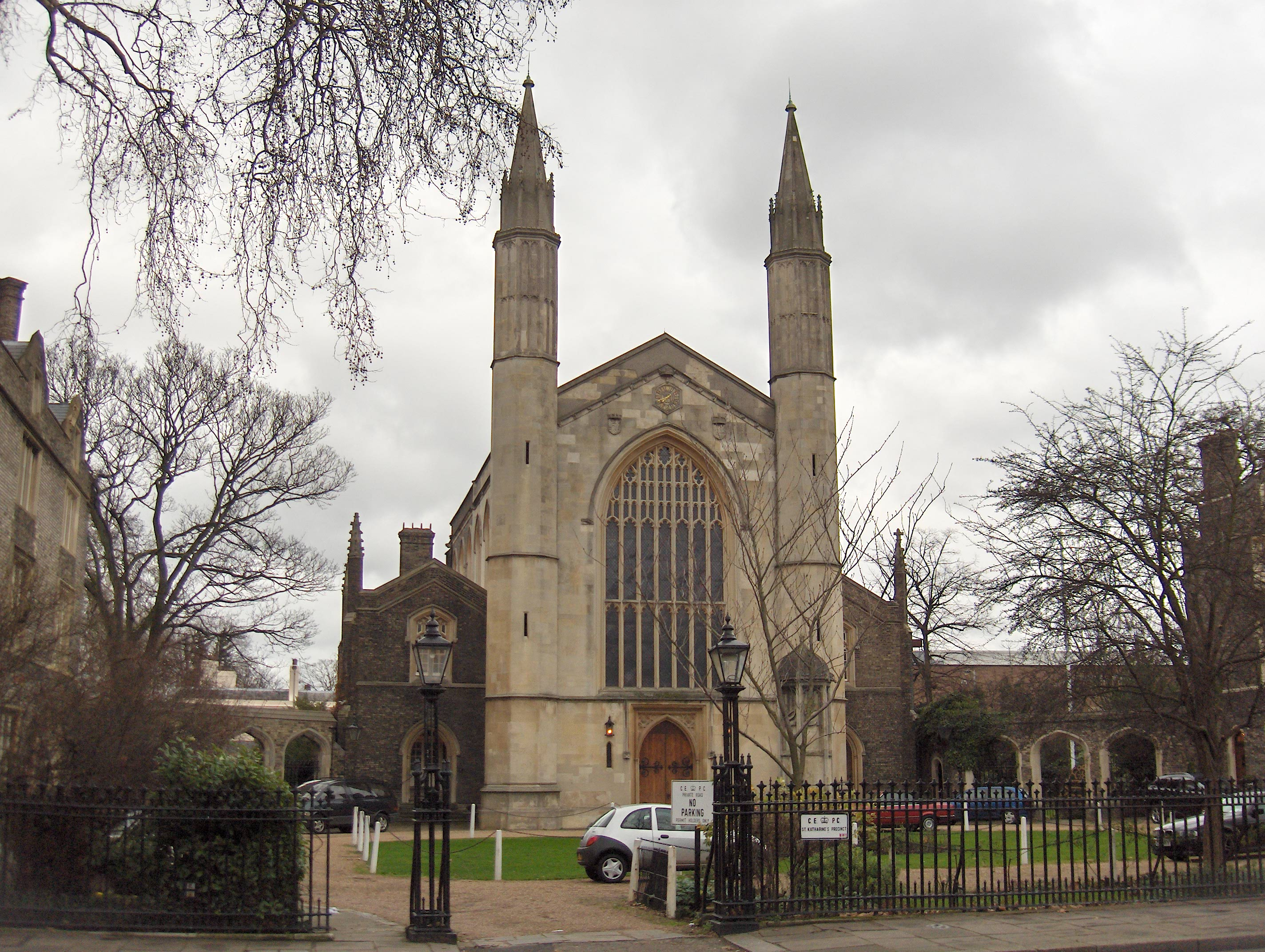
Danish Church (St Katharine's)

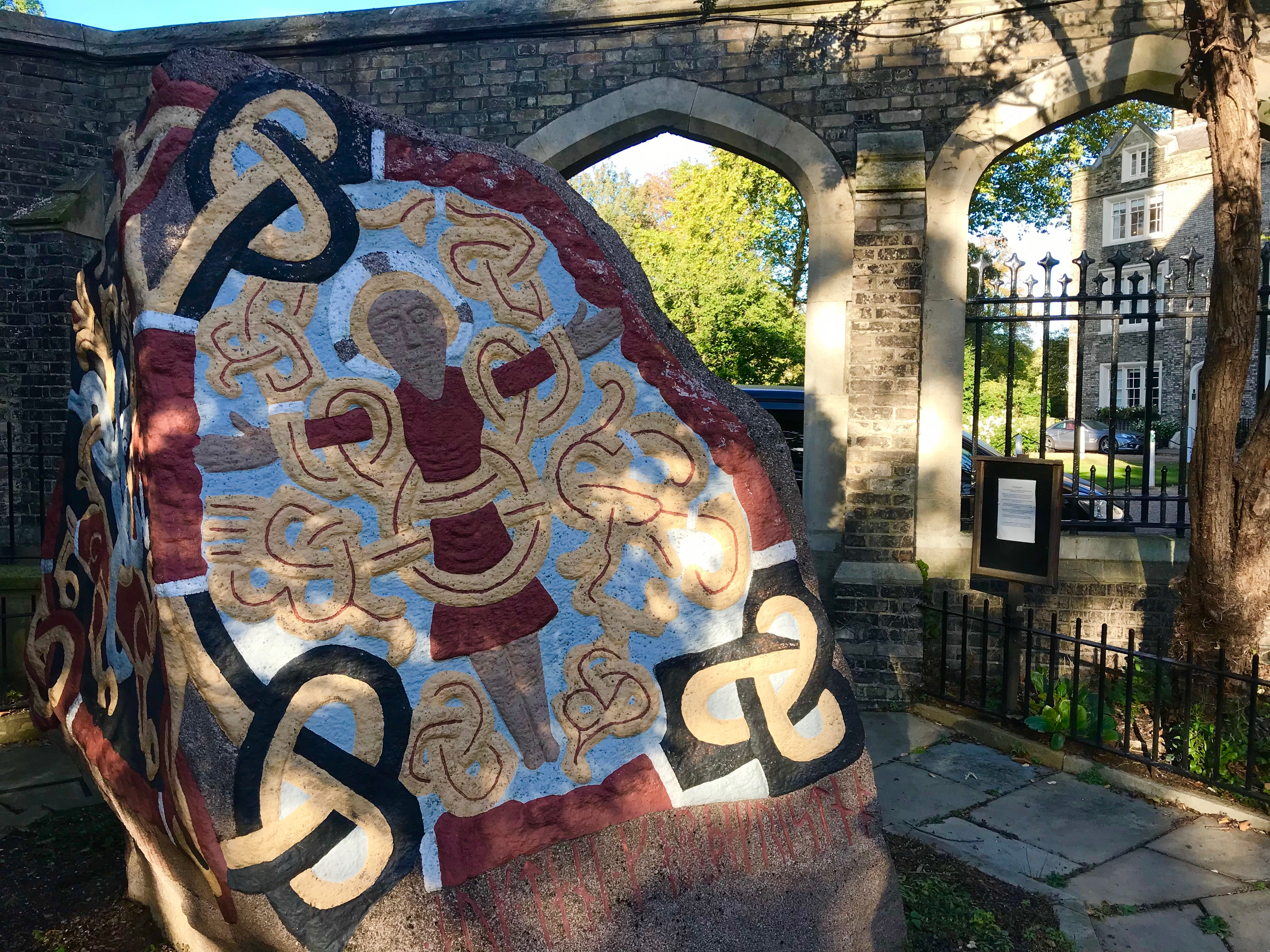
Replica of Jelling stone

The church is at 4 Saint Katharine's Precinct, Regent's Park, London NW1 4HH (off Albany Street) (51°32′2″N 0°8′48″W). The nearest London Underground stations are Camden Town or Great Portland Street. The building is the former Anglican chapel of St Katharine's Hospital, which retains its original dedication to Saint Katharine, and was built in 1826–8. The architect was Ambrose Poynter. It has been Grade II* listed since 1954. There is a replica of Harald Bluetooth's Jelling stone located next to the church.

The Danish Seamen's Mission in London is based at 322 Rope Street, Rotherhithe (51°29′40″N 0°2′1″W). There is also a Danish Church in Hull (the St Nikolaj Danish Seamen's Church at 104 Osborne Street) (53°44′33″N 0°20′44″W).

The London and Hull congregations are both part of the Danske Sømands og Udlands Kirker (DSUK) - The Danish Church Abroad / Danish Seamen's Church. The DSUK was founded in 2004 through the merger of The Danish Church Abroad and The Danish Seamen's Church in Foreign Ports. The DSUK is affiliated to the Evangelical Lutheran Church of Denmark.

From 1696 to 1870 there was a Danish church in Wellclose Square. It was built by Caius Gabriel Cibber who was born in Denmark. His wooden figures of Moses and Saint John the Baptist were taken from the original church and placed in St Katharine's.

== Finnish Church ==
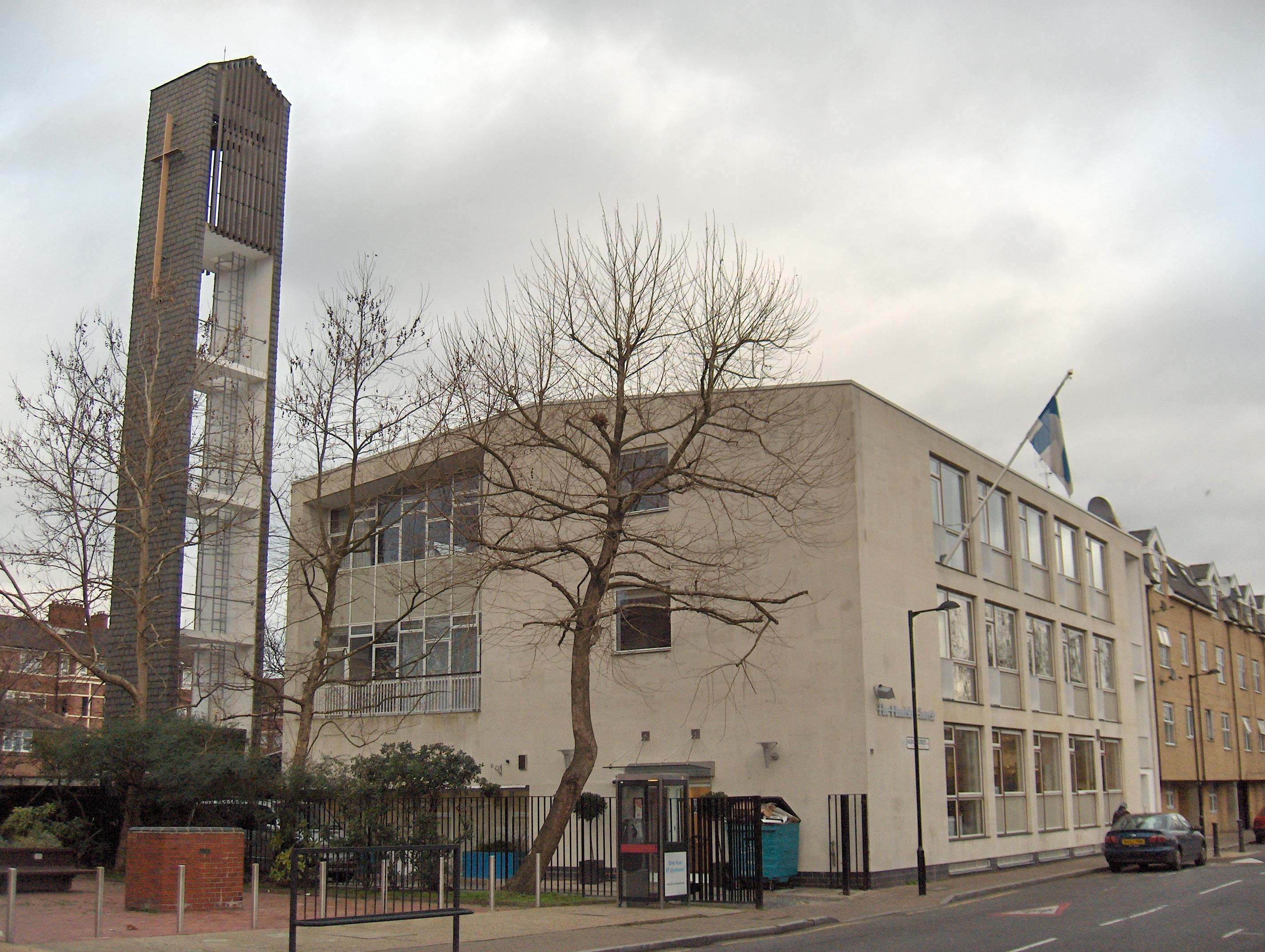
Finnish Church

The Finnish Seamen's Mission and church (Suomen Merimieskirkko, Finlands Sjömanskyrka) is at 33 Albion Street, Rotherhithe, London, SE16 (51°29′58″N 0°3′11″W). The current rector is Revd Marjaana Härkönen. The church also has a shop selling Finnish products and has hostel accommodation for visitors to London.

The London church and mission was first established in 1882, when the Finnish port chaplain who had been sent to Hull in 1880 was relocated south because of the level of work demanded in London. The present church building was opened in 1958 and refurbished in 2006; its distinctive architecture was recognised as a Grade II listed building in 1998. The architect was Cyril Sjöström Mardall of Yorke Rosenberg Mardall.

Rotherhithe railway station (on the London Overground) is nearby (on Brunel Road). The nearest alternative is Canada Water station on the Jubilee line. It is also possible to take bus routes 381 or C10 to Rotherhithe station.

The approach ramp to the Rotherhithe Tunnel is immediately behind the church (between Albion Street and Brunel Road). The Brunel Engine House is nearby; Rotherhithe Library is between the Finnish Church and St Olav's Norwegian Church.

== Icelandic congregation ==
Lutheran services in Icelandic are held (usually on the third Sunday of every month) at the German Church (Deutsche Evangelische Christuskirche), 19 Montpelier Place, Knightsbridge (51°29′58″N 0°9′58″W). There are also regular Icelandic services being held at the Ulrika Eleonora Swedish Church of London, Harcourt Street.

== Norwegian Church ==
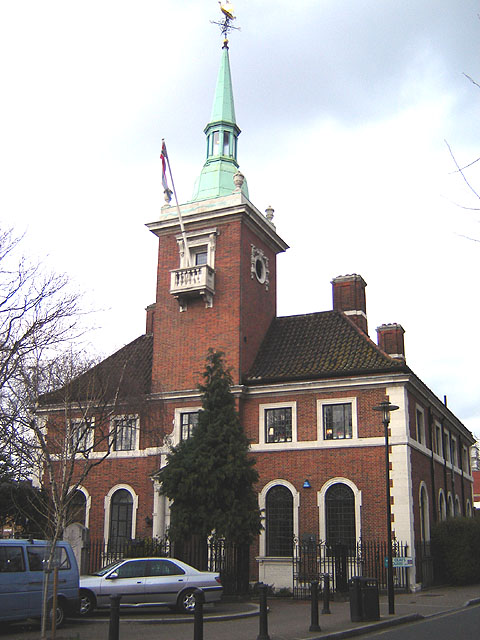
Norwegian Church (St Olav's)

There has been a Norwegian church in London since the late 17th century. The current church building (St Olav's, designed by John Love Seaton Dahl) was consecrated in 1927, the foundation stone was laid the previous year by Prince Olav (later King Olav V of Norway). King Haakon VII and the Norwegian government in exile regularly worshipped at the church during World War II, when the church was given the status of a pro-cathedral. The church has been a Grade II listed building since 1949.

St Olav's Church is close to the River Thames in Rotherhithe at 1 St Olav's Square, Albion Street (next to the entrance to the Rotherhithe Tunnel) (51°29′57″N 0°3′15″W). The nearest Underground stations are Rotherhithe or Canada Water. The congregation is part of the Norwegian Church Abroad (also called The Norwegian Seamen's Churches or in Norwegian, Sjømannskirken.) The Finnish Church (see above) is nearby in Albion Street.

The Norwegian Church Abroad also runs the Norwegian Fishermans' Church, Liverpool, and formerly ran the Norwegian Church, Cardiff.

In addition to regular church events, the church organises activities such as Saturday school and football practice.

== Swedish Church ==
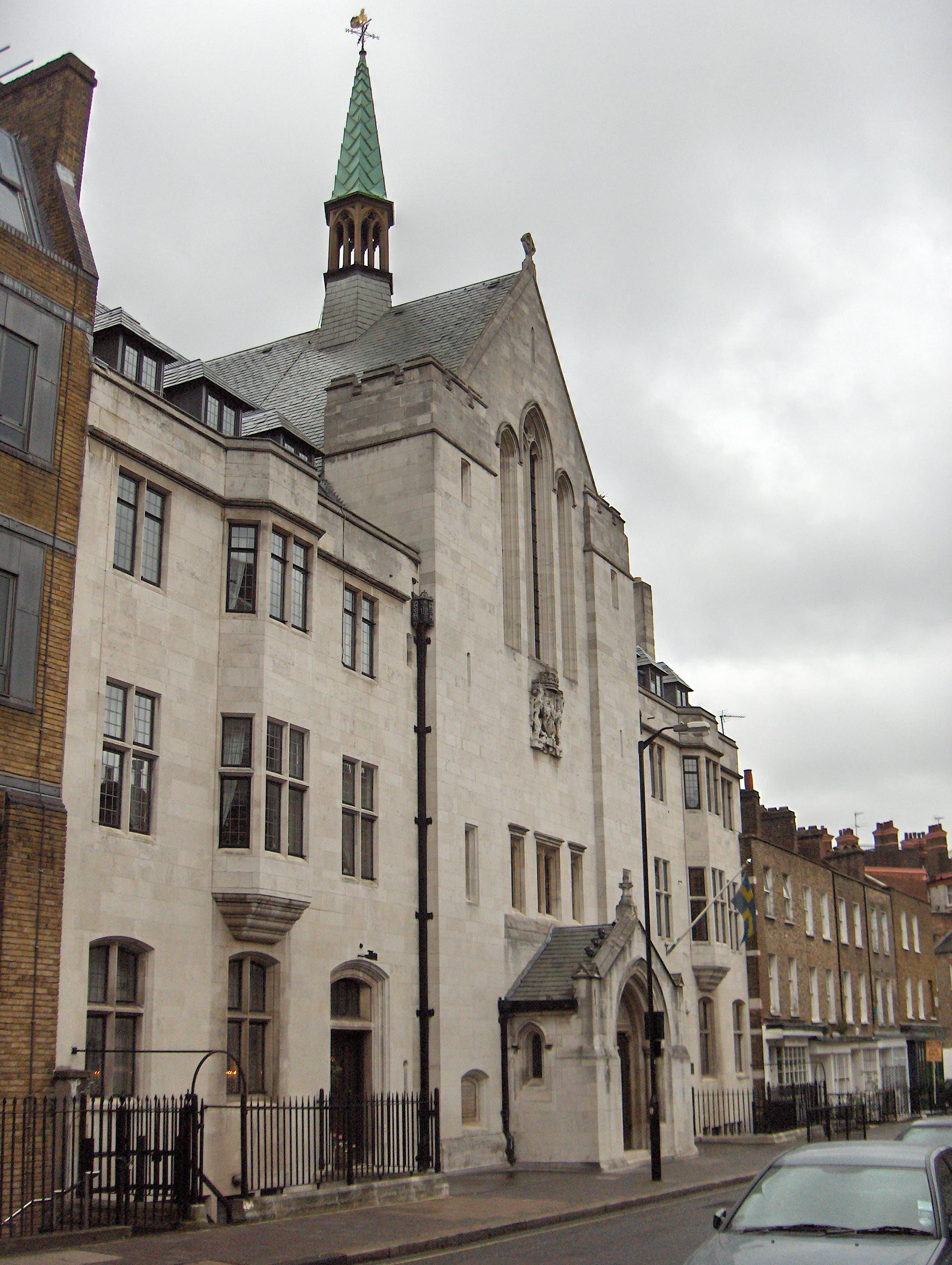
Swedish Church, Harcourt St.

The Ulrika Eleonora Swedish Parish in London is part of "Church of Sweden Abroad" (Svenska kyrkan i utlandet: SKUT). The first church for the Swedish community in London opened in Princes Square in Wapping in 1728, but it was replaced and relocated in the early 20th century. There is now only one Swedish church in London - Ulrika Eleonora.

Ulrika Eleonora Church is at 6 Harcourt Street, Marylebone (51°31′12″N 0°9′53″W). It was built in 1911 and is a Grade II listed building. The altar, pulpit, fonts and chandeliers are from the former church in Wapping. As well as the church and staff accommodation, there is also a reading room, church hall, library and parish office. The nearest Underground station is Edgware Road on the Circle line, District line and Hammersmith & City line.

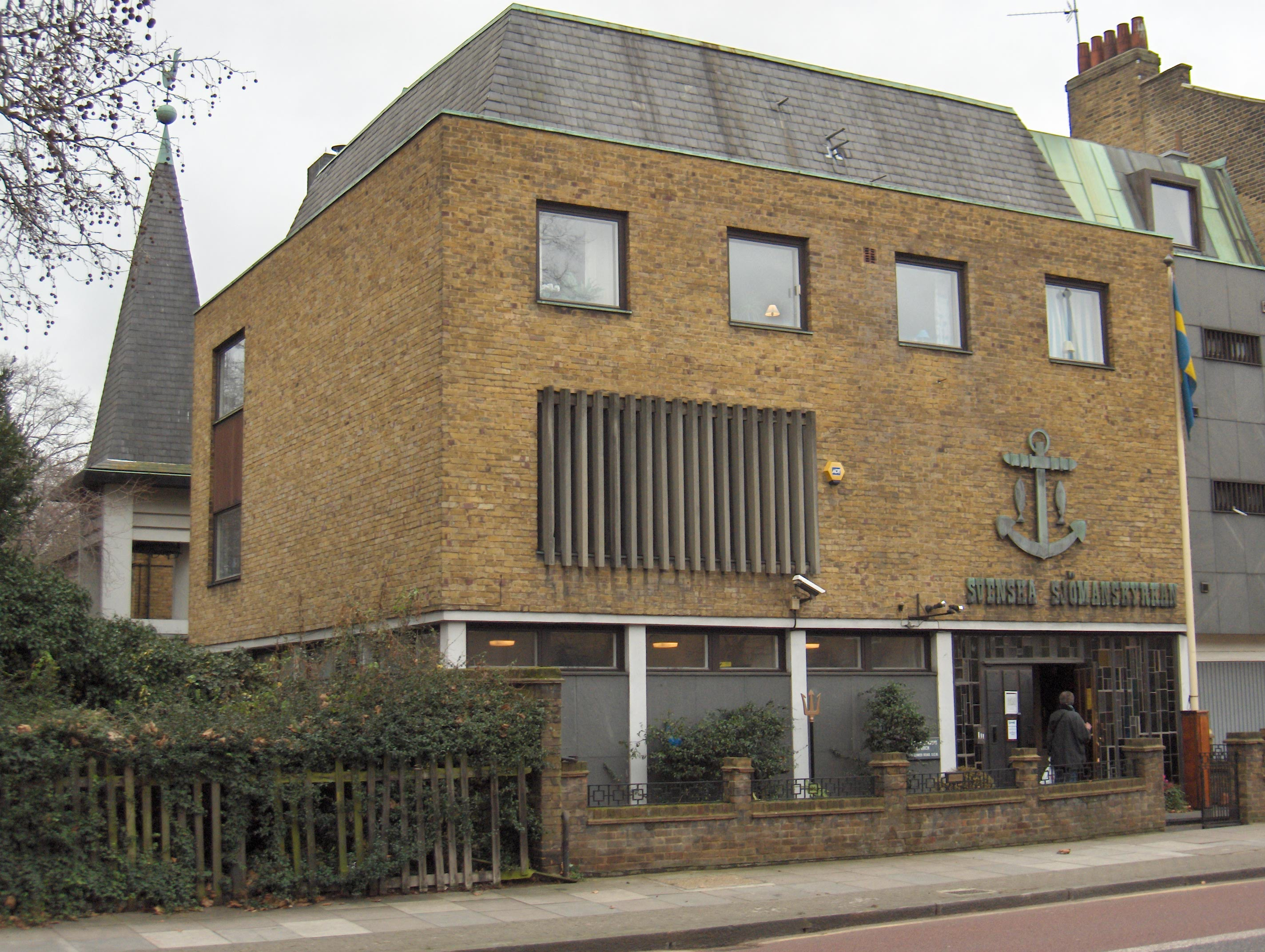
Swedish Seamen's Church, London

The Swedish Seamen's Church was opened at 120 Lower Road, Rotherhithe (51°29′42″N 0°3′3″W) in 1905. It closed down in December 2012.

SKUT is accountable to the General Synod of the Church of Sweden. SKUT provides 3 staff, and the congregation is responsible for other staff, buildings etc. Since 2002 SKUT has been linked to the Diocese of Visby; the Bishop of Visby is responsible for episcopal oversight.

== See also ==
- Church of Denmark
- Church of the Faroe Islands
- Church of Iceland
- Church of Norway
- Church of Sweden
- Evangelical Lutheran Church of Finland
