= Church of Sweden Abroad =

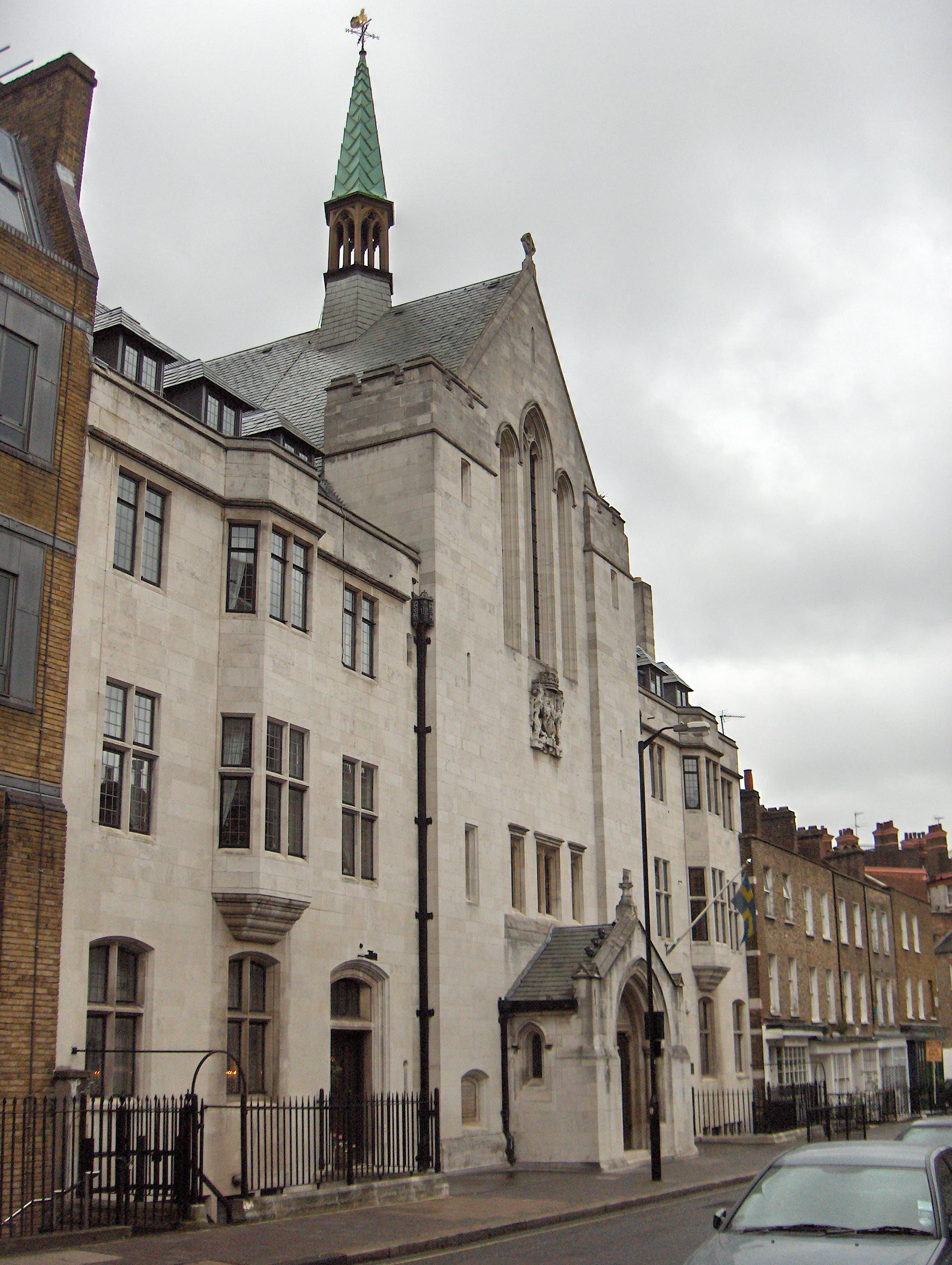
Church of Queen Ulrika Eleonora, Harcourt St., London

The Church of Sweden Abroad (Swedish: Svenska kyrkan i utlandet, SKUT) is an institution of the Evangelical Lutheran Church of Sweden. The Church of Sweden Abroad has more than 40 parishes throughout the world, concentrated in Western Europe. Another 80 cities are served by visiting clergy.

In administration and practice SKUT forms a single body, originally under the direction of a committee of the General Synod, but since 1 January 2012 organised by a newly formed Council, giving SKUT many of the features of a diocese, though without that legal status, and without a bishop of its own. Instead, it is placed under the episcopal oversight of the Bishop of Visby. Under the new 2012 organisation SKUT has gained constituent seats on the General Synod of the Church of Sweden, like the 13 mainland dioceses.

== History ==
The first parish established abroad was that of Paris, France, which dates from 1626 when the Roman Catholic king of France, Louis XIII, allowed a Swedish Protestant pastor to minister to the Swedish and German regiments fighting in his royal army. The congregation developed with the Swedish community in Paris and was at the foundation of several Swedish institutions in the city, such as a school and an hospice. It served as embassy church for several hundred years, and until 1988 the rector was also an official of the Swedish embassy in Paris. Today the Swedish Sofia Parish (Svenska Sofiaförsamlingen), named for queen Sofia of Nassau, is one of SKUT's largest. It was also the first (and so far only) expatriate parish of the Church of Sweden to appoint a female rector, the Reverend Karin Burstrand. (Mrs Burstrand would however leave her functions, to assume those of dean of Gothenburg Cathedral in summer 2008.)

== Restructuring of 2012 ==
The 2012 restructuring of SKUT gave the organisation a quasi-diocesan nature, including a governing Council, and seats on the General Synod. At the same time, staffing was reviewed with a total reduction of 25%. The locations of overseas parishes were also reviewed, with significant changes made, including the closure of two parishes in Spain (and later two more), the replacing of the Cairo parish with a mobile priest in north Africa, closures in Antwerp and northern Denmark (Skagen), and the closure of the Swedish Seamen's Church in Lower Road, Rotherhithe, London. Previously London had been the only city outside Sweden to have two Church of Sweden parishes. The other SKUT parish in London (in Harcourt Street) remains open and active, but the total number of church staff in London was also reduced from 2 priests and 4 pastoral assistants, to 2 priests and 1 pastoral assistant. The following year (2013) SKUT also closed its only other United Kingdom parish, in Liverpool, and discontinued the parish priest's post in that city. Meanwhile, several new parishes have opened in Europe and Asia.

== Deployment of deacons ==
SKUT has traditionally employed ordained priests in overseas parishes, supported by some professional lay workers (pastoral assistants and musicians). During 2011, a decision was made to employ full-time ordained deacons to work in areas of social care and outreach. This is a normal part of church life in Sweden, but had not previously been practiced in the overseas parishes. The Archbishop's annual report and review of 2011 stated: "The Committee for the Church of Sweden Abroad made a historic decision in 2011 by setting up deacon posts. These can strengthen parish welfare practice and ensure that the parish develops favourably. Through solid parish welfare services, the Church of Sweden Abroad gains trust and is able to serve its members in the way that it should. The decision was made following a study."

== List of churches ==
Africa

- A peripatetic priest is assigned to Africa

There are no longer any fixed parishes in Africa.

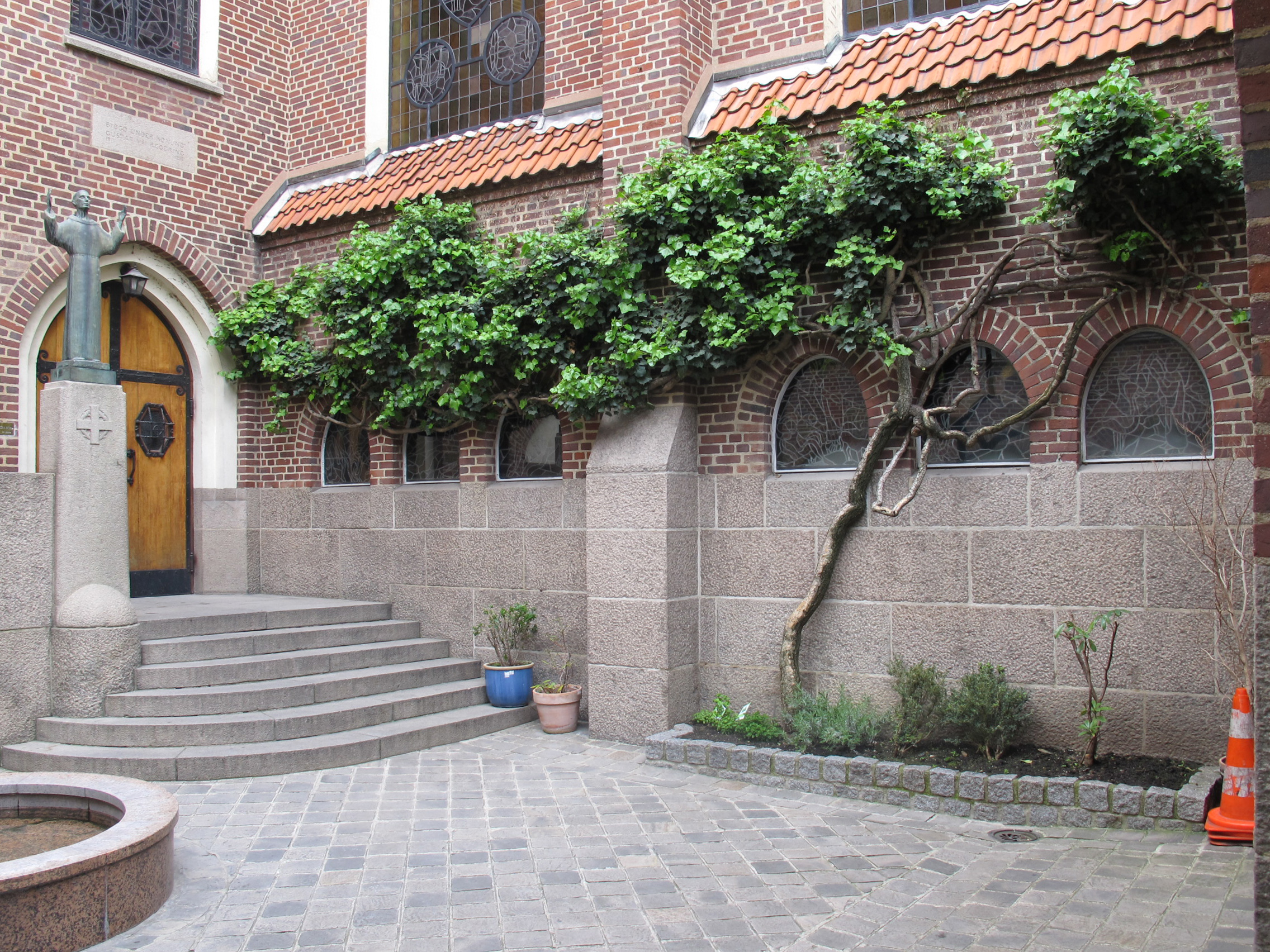
Church of Queen Sofia, the SKUT parish church in Paris, France.

Asia

- A peripatetic priest is assigned to Asia
- Bangkok, Thailand
- Phuket, Thailand
- Dubai, United Arab Emirates
- Hong Kong, China
- Jerusalem
- Singapore, Singapore

Europe

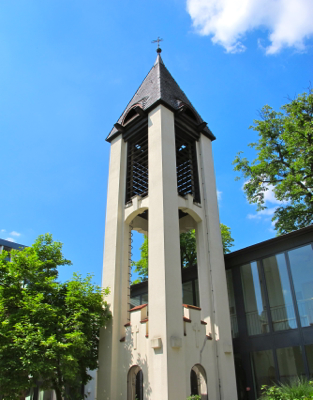
Belltower of the Church of Princess Victoria, the SKUT parish church in Berlin, Germany.

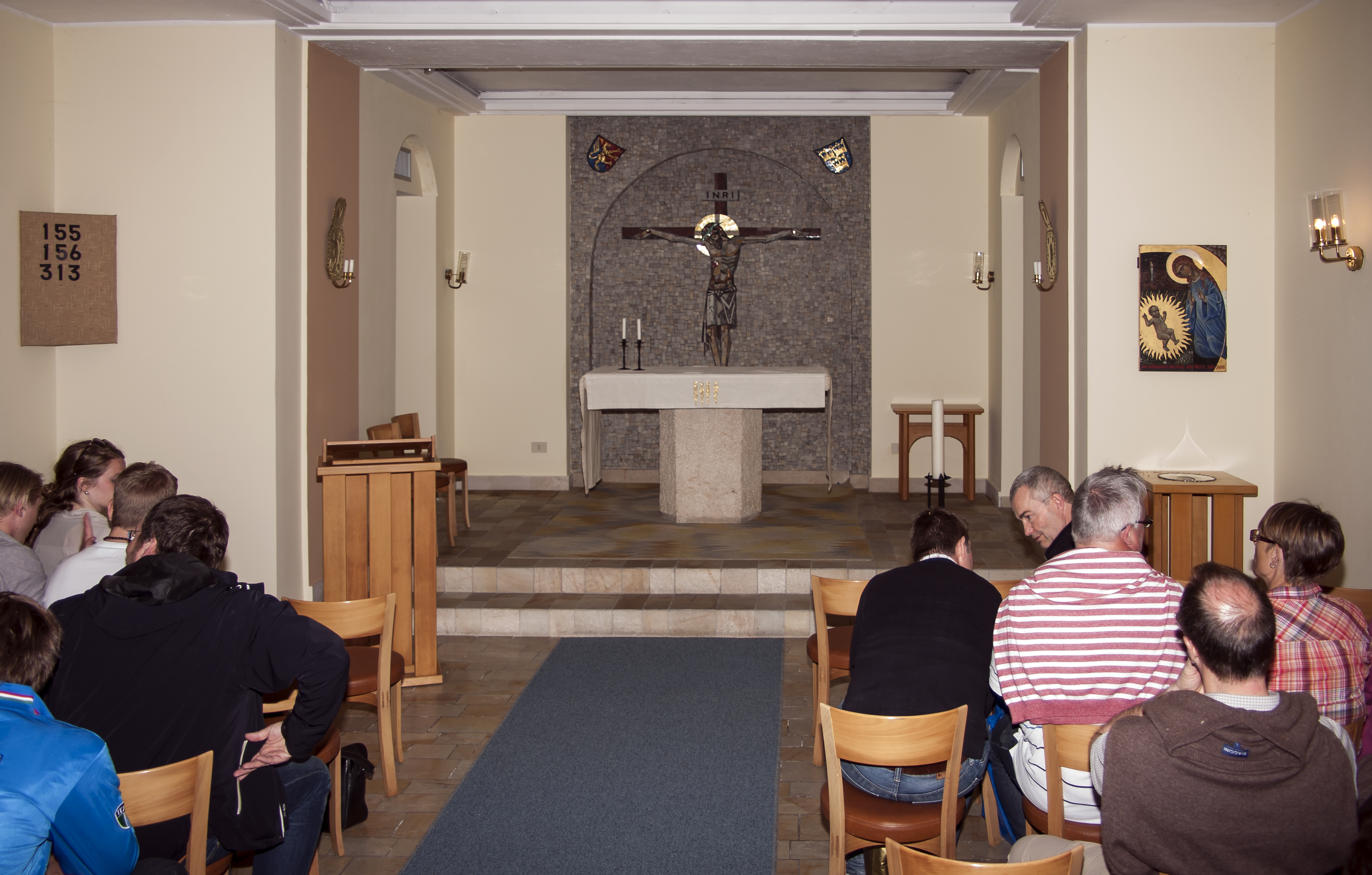
Chapel of St. Catherine, the SKUT chapel in Rome, Italy.

- Athens, Greece
- Ayia Napa, Cyprus
- Berlin, Germany
- Bern, Switzerland
- Brussels, Belgium
- Copenhagen, Denmark
- Frankfurt, Germany
- Fuengirola, Spain
- Geneva, Switzerland
- Hamburg, Germany
- Helsinki, Finland (in 2007, the church was transferred to the Diocese of Borgå, The Evangelical Lutheran Church of Finland)
- Lausanne, Switzerland
- London, United Kingdom
- Los Cristianos, Spain (Tenerife)
- Monaco (& the south of France)
- Munich, Germany
- Oslo, Norway
- Palma de Mallorca, Spain
- Paris, France
- Rhodes, Greece
- Rome, Italy
- Rotterdam, Netherlands
- Tallinn, Estonia (Swedish-speaking congregation in the Estonian Evangelical Lutheran Church)
- Torrevieja, Spain
- Vienna, Austria
- Zurich, Switzerland

North America

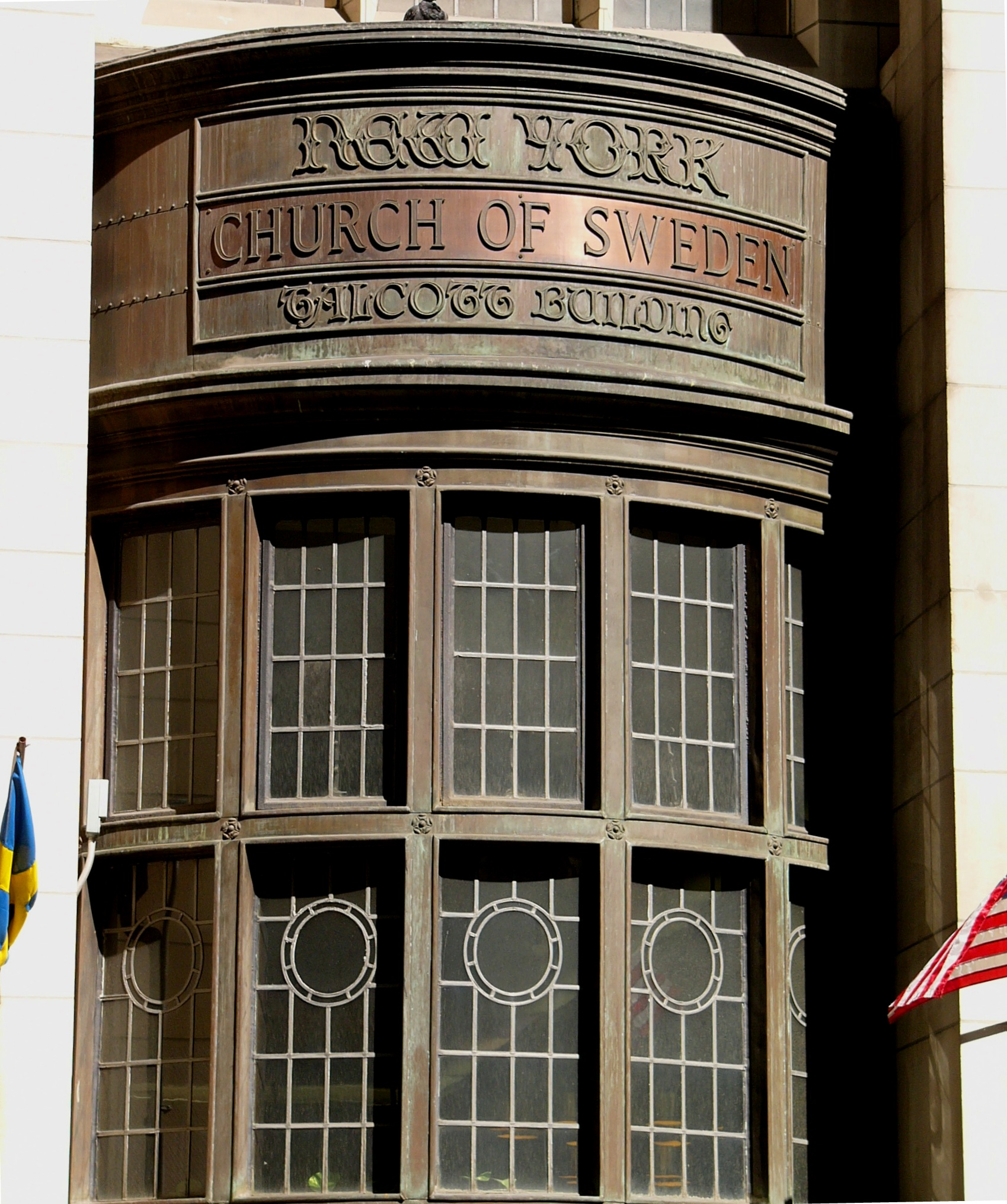
Manhattan, New York City

- Florida, United States
- Los Angeles, United States
- Church of Sweden in New York, New York City, United States
- San Francisco, United States
- Washington DC, United States
- Toronto, Canada

Oceania

- Melbourne, Australia
- Sydney, Australia

South America

- A peripatetic priest is assigned to South America
- Buenos Aires, Argentina
- São Paulo, Brazil

== See also ==
- Diocese of Visby
- Finnish Seamen's Mission
- Scandinavian churches in London
- Norwegian Seamen’s Church
- Danish Seamen's Church and Church Abroad
- Sweden
