= Norwegian Church, Cardiff =

Arts centre, based in a church, in Wales

Norwegian Church Arts Centre
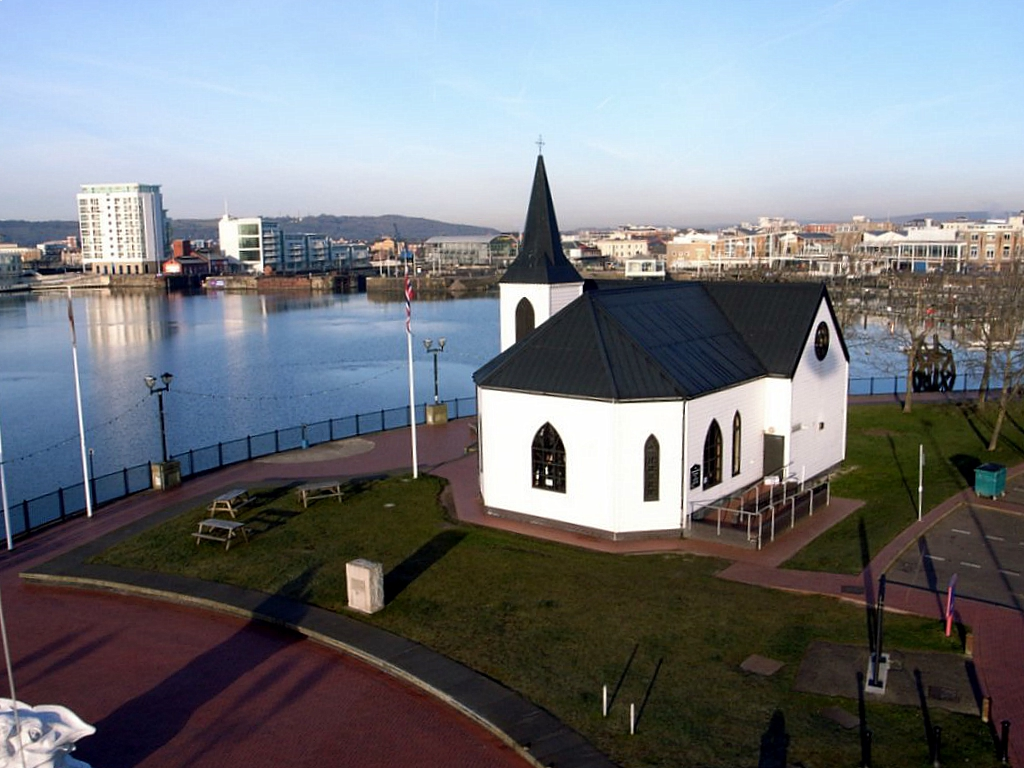
- Interactive map of Norwegian Church Arts Centre
- 51°27′41″N 3°09′43″W
- Location: Cardiff Bay

History
- Built: 1868
- Original use: Lutheran Church

Site notes
- Current use: Museum; Arts Centre; Cafe
- Owner: Norwegian Church Preservation Trust
- Visitors: 180,000 (in 2018/19)
- Website: http://www.norwegianchurchcardiff.com

The Norwegian Church Arts Centre (Welsh: Canolfan Gelfyddydau'r Eglwys Norwyaidd) is a point of cultural and historical interest located in Cardiff Bay (Tiger Bay), Wales. It was a Lutheran Church, consecrated in 1868. Under the patronage of the Norwegian Seamen's Mission it provided home comforts, communication with family and a place of worship for Scandinavian sailors and the Norwegian community in Cardiff for over a hundred years.

== History ==
In the 19th century, Cardiff was one of Britain's three major ports, along with London and Liverpool. The Norwegian merchant fleet at the time was the third largest in the world, and Cardiff became one of the major centres of its operations.

Sjømannskirken – the Norwegian Church Abroad organisation, which is part of the Church of Norway – followed in its footsteps. Under Carl Herman Lund from Oslo, a Church was built in 1868 in Cardiff Bay between the East and West Docks on land donated by the John Crichton-Stuart, 3rd Marquess of Bute, to serve the religious needs of Norwegian sailors and expatriates.

Consecrated in December 1868, the church was clad in iron sheets on the instruction of the harbourmaster, to allow it to be moved if necessary. However, the construction form allowed it to be extended many times:

- 1883: Reading room enlarged
- 1885: Gallery and bell-tower added
- 1894: Reading room enlarged, reclad in wood

Known until this point as the Norwegian Iron Church, it now became known as the Little White Church, and became a welcome home point for sailors. Resultantly, and open to all sailors as a mission offering food and shelter, between 1867 and 1915 the number of sailors visiting the church rose from 7,572 to 73,580 per annum.

=== Original community ===
When the church was in its prime it had a lot of public activity; from the Nordic community settling in Cardiff and making roots there, to the Norwegian sailors using the place as a rest stop on their travels. The church became a home away from home for the sailors during World War II as they weren't able to go back to Norway due to Nazi occupation. The church hosted many important family occasions, such as weddings and christenings, for the community, as well as more educational projects like cookery classes.

=== Decline ===
Even pre-World War I, coal exports from Cardiff were in decline. Post World War II, shipping trade moved from Cardiff, and in 1959 the mission's work was discontinued. In the early 1960s, the Norwegian Seamen's Mission withdrew its patronage, and the last seaman's priest, Per Konrad Hansen, was withdrawn. The residual congregation and other Lutheran organisations funded its continued use by the resident expatriate Norwegian community. It was closed and de-consecrated in 1974.

=== Preservation ===
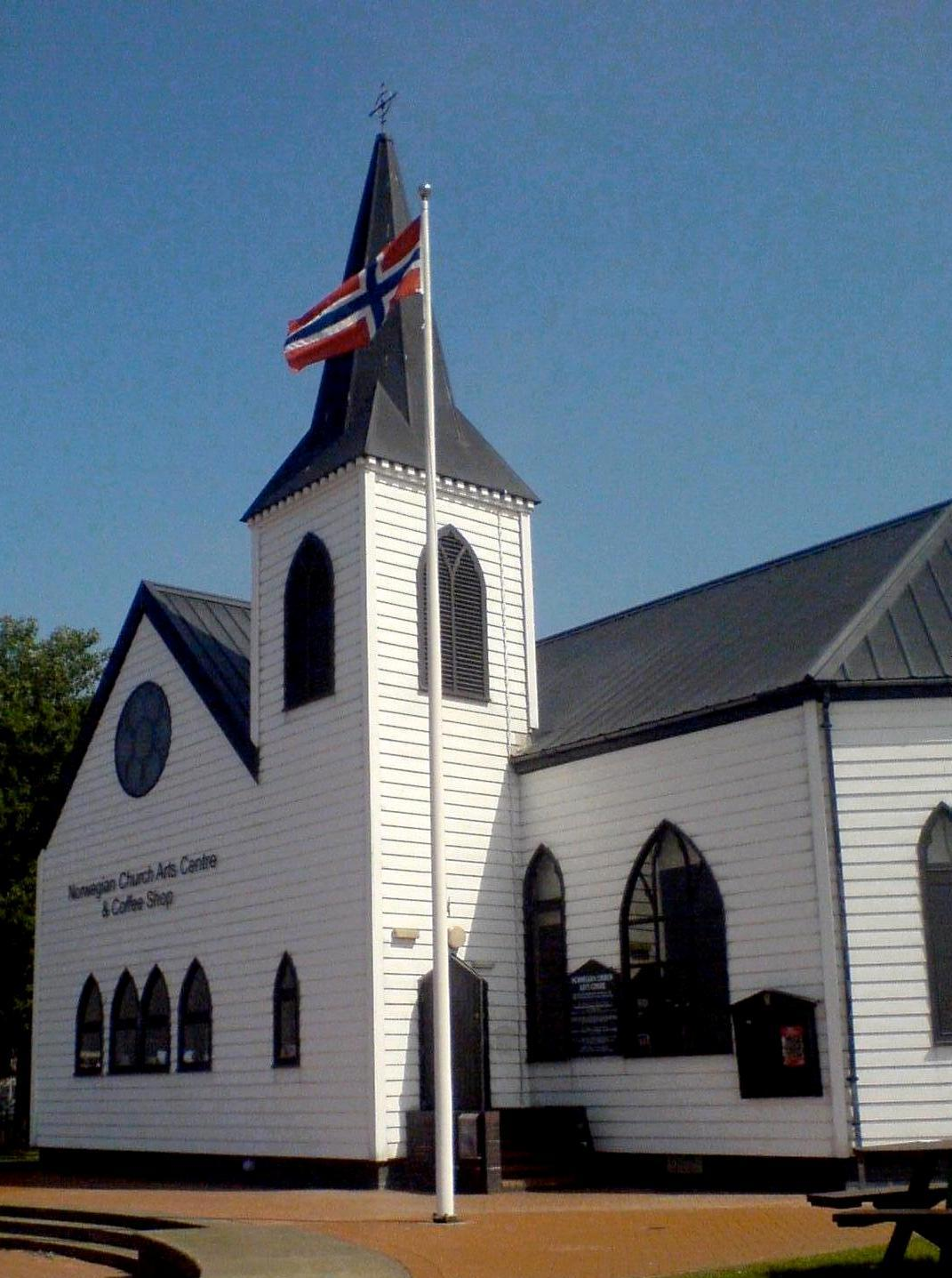
Norwegian Church, Cardiff

In light of developments in Cardiff Bay in the late 1980s, and the proposed building of new roads around Atlantic Wharf, the now derelict and vandalised church was threatened with total destruction.

The community formed the Norwegian Church Preservation Trust, to save the building in the redeveloped docks. In partnership with the Norwegian Support Committee in Bergen, the trust raised £250,000, enabling the church to be dismantled in 1987, preserved and stored pending reassembly. The remaining original features were rescued, including the pulpit, one side-window, the chandelier and the model-ship, all of which were returned to the church.

With the Wales Millennium Centre built on its original site, with land donated by Associated British Ports, in 1992 reconstruction on the current site was started. In April 1992, the church was re-opened by Princess Märtha Louise of Norway.

== Roald Dahl ==
The writer Roald Dahl, who was born in Cardiff to Norwegian parents, was baptised in the church, as were his sisters. The family worshipped in the church. Throughout his life Dahl had ties with the church and in the 1970s when the church first fell into a state of disrepair, Dahl was at the forefront of a campaign to raise money to save it. This led to Dahl being appointed the first president of The Norwegian Church Preservation Trust after it was set up in 1987 by the church.

A room in the church is named 'The Dahl Gallery', in memory of Dahl and to commemorate what he did for the church. In this room is;

- The silver christening bowl used to baptise Dahl and his siblings.
- A shield given to the church's pastor as a gift, as during World War II the church was home to sailors who could not return to their homeland.
- An anchor and oars in the shape of a cross. The oars are believed to be from a Norwegian sailing ship and the anchor is a gift to honour the church's maritime heritage.

As well as this honour, Dahl is also celebrated yearly in September, the month of his 1916 birth. In 2016 Cardiff Bay celebrated the centenary of Dahl's birth, with a project launched by The Norwegian Church.

== Present day ==
The building is now used as an arts centre, and is known as the Norwegian Church Arts Centre. The centre includes a café and an art gallery. In May 2011 the church underwent refurbishment costing £500,000 (equivalent to £739,362 in 2025), including a new outdoor terrace and a DDA compliant lift. The Grieg room hosts a diversity of local arts and culture.

== Popular culture ==
A 2008 episode of the BBC Television drama series Torchwood, "To The Last Man", had some scenes shot outside the church.

== See also ==
- Norwegian Church, Swansea
- Norwegian Fishermans' Church, Liverpool
- Religion in Wales
- Scandinavian churches in London
- Cardiff Docks
