= Finnish Seamen's Mission =

Christian organisation

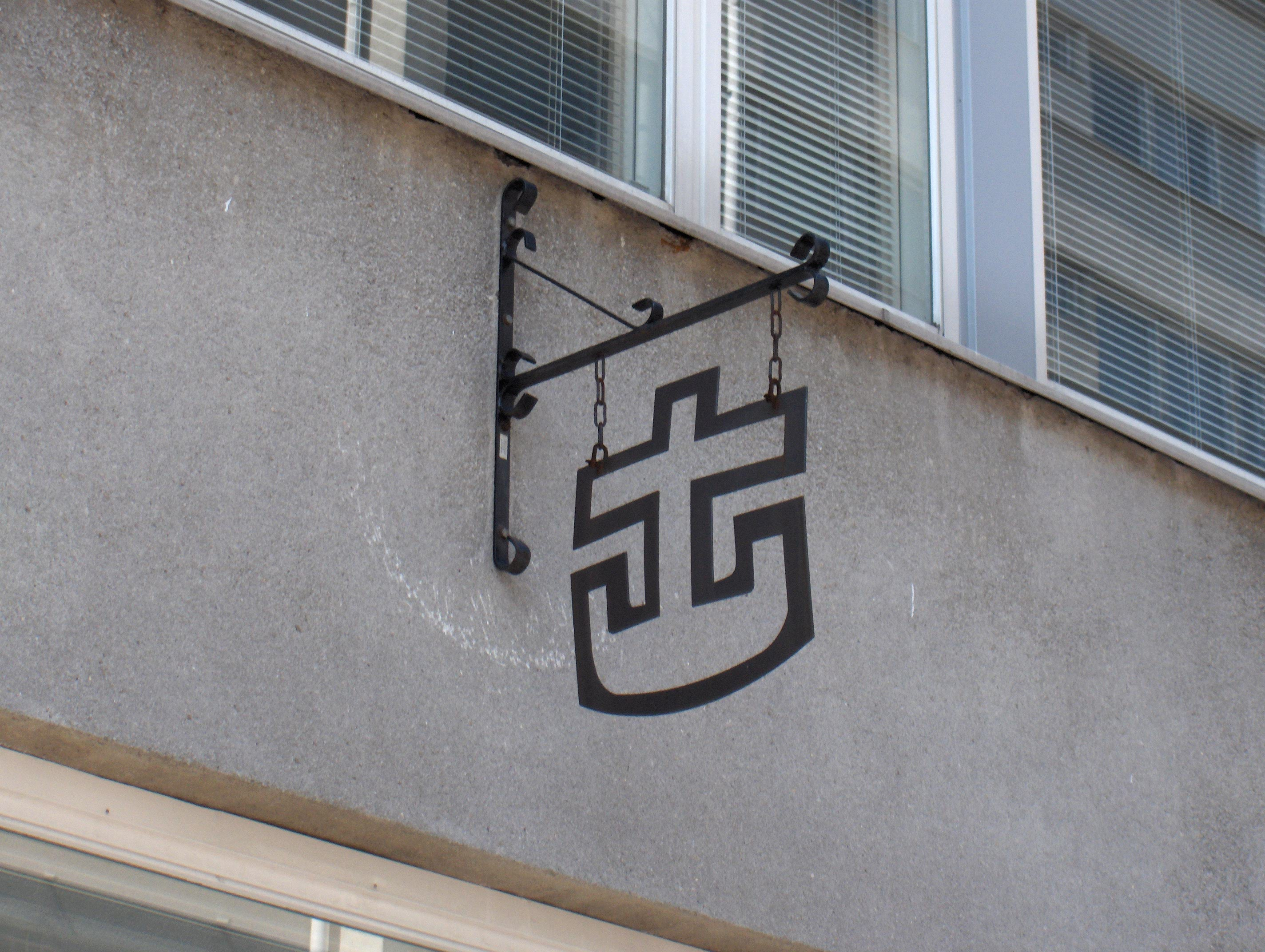
The symbol of the Finnish Seamen's Mission, outside the headquarters in Helsinki

The Finnish Seamen's Mission (Finnish: Suomen Merimieskirkko ry, Swedish: Finlands Sjömanskyrka rf) was established in 1875. It was established to help Finns travelling abroad, particularly seafarers and migrant workers. It is a Christian organisation which provides church services and pastoral care, and also aims to provide cultural and social services to the Finnish community. The Secretary General (Pääsihteeri) as of 2015 is Hannu Suihkonen.

The Finnish Seamen's Mission works in close co-operation with the Evangelical Lutheran Church of Finland, although it is a separate organisation. Finnish Lutheran clergy are based in the missions.

There are also other Finnish Lutheran congregations and clergy outside of Finland, but the Finnish Seamen's Mission and the Finnish Church Abroad work together to prevent duplication of work.

== Locations in Finland ==
Within Finland, the Mission has branches at Hamina, Helsinki, Kemi, Kokkola, Kotka, Oulu, Pori, Raahe, Rauma and Turku. The headquarters is at Albertinkatu in Helsinki. A new international seamen's church is being planned for the new Port of Vuosaari in Vuosaari, East Helsinki; this will open at the same time as the new port.

== Locations outside Finland ==
Outside Finland, there are branches at Brussels, Gdańsk, Hamburg, London, Lübeck, Piraeus, Rotterdam and Warsaw. As well as seafarers, the facilities are increasingly used by Finnish truck drivers, students and other expatriate workers.

=== Belgium and Luxembourg ===
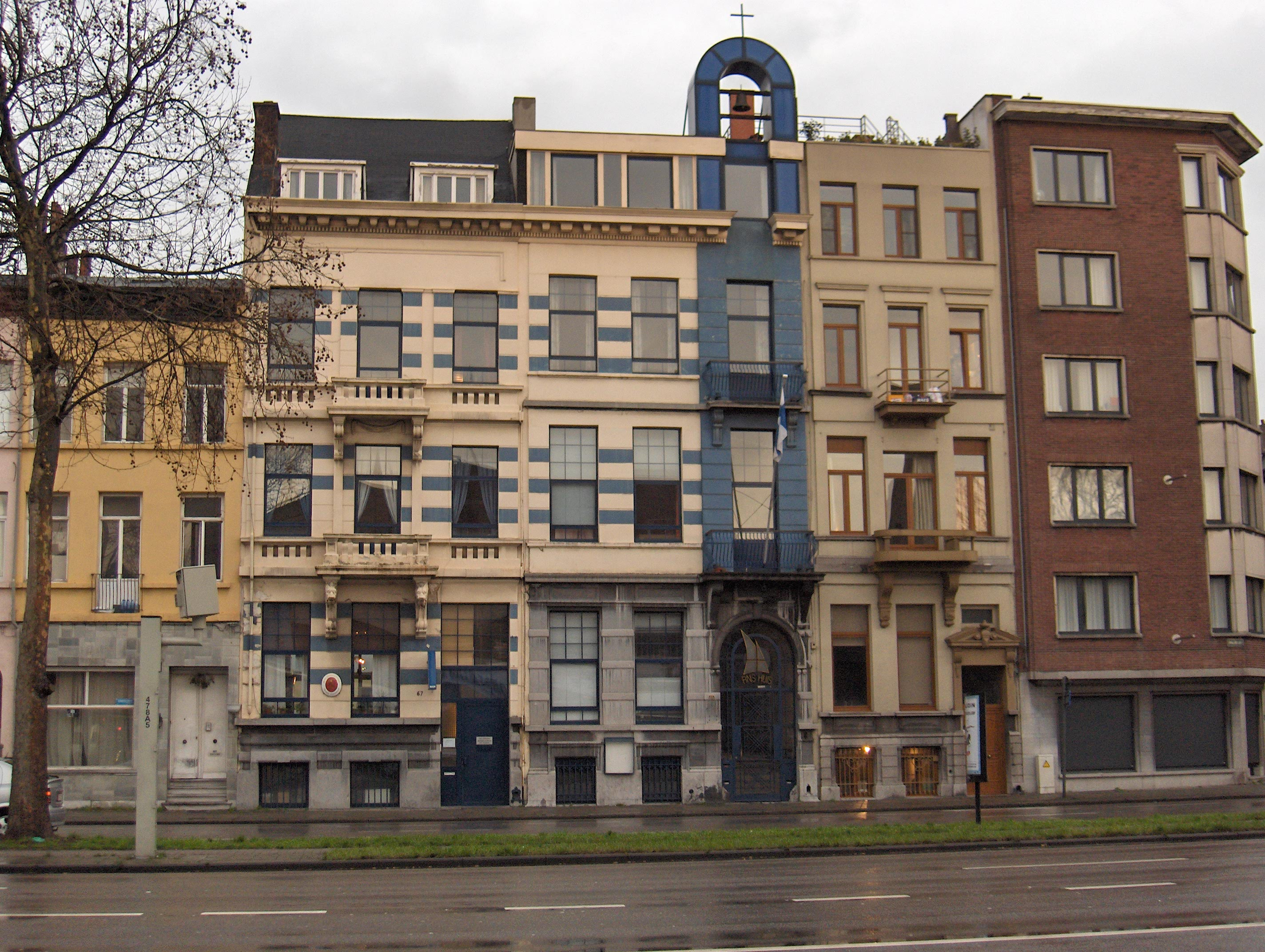
Merimieskirkko, Antwerp, Belgium

The Finnish Seamen's Mission has two branches in Belgium – Antwerp and Brussels. There are also services held from time to time in Luxembourg. The Antwerp mission will be closed in 2015.

In Antwerp, the Merimieskirkko is located at Italiëlei 67 (but will close in August 2015).

In Brussels, it is located at Rue Jacques de Lalaing 33 and includes a sauna. The pastor is the Revd Jussi Ollila. Communion services are, however, normally held at the Chapel of the Resurrection in Rue Van Maerlant on the first and third Sundays of each month.

=== United Kingdom ===
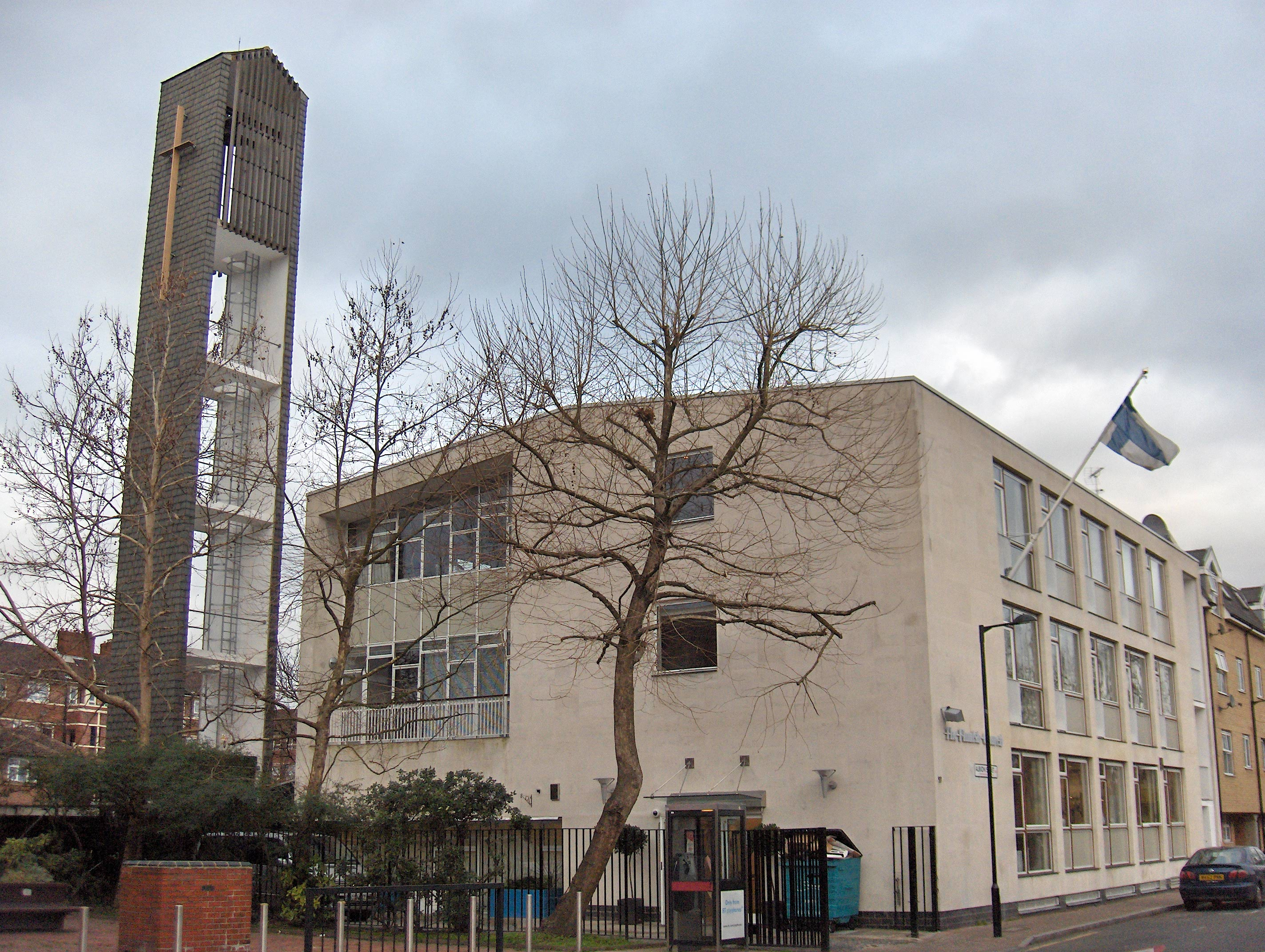
Finnish Church, London

There is only one Merimieskirkko building in the UK (in London), but services are also occasionally held in other towns and cities. The church is located at 33 Albion Street, Rotherhithe, London (near Rotherhithe station on the London Overground network). A communion service is held on the first Sunday of each month at 11 a.m. (conducted mainly in Finnish). An evening service is conducted on Sundays at 6 p.m. and on Thursday at 7.30 p.m. In addition, services are held on church festival days.

The first person sent abroad by the Finnish Seamen's Mission was Elis Bergroth. He was initially posted as Finnish chaplain at the English ports of Grimsby and Hull in 1880. Given the level of work in London, the chaplaincy was moved south in 1882.

The present building was opened in 1958 and is the third Finnish Church in London. The architect of the Church, Cyrill Mardall-Sjöström, designed the new church building for a plot in Southwark Park, but this plan had to be scrapped owing to World War II. A new site was later found in Rotherhithe, an area with a Scandinavian and Nordic connections where the Danish, Norwegian and Swedish seamen's missions also are present and where the four Nordic churches and the Church of Iceland community cooperate in their work.

=== Germany ===
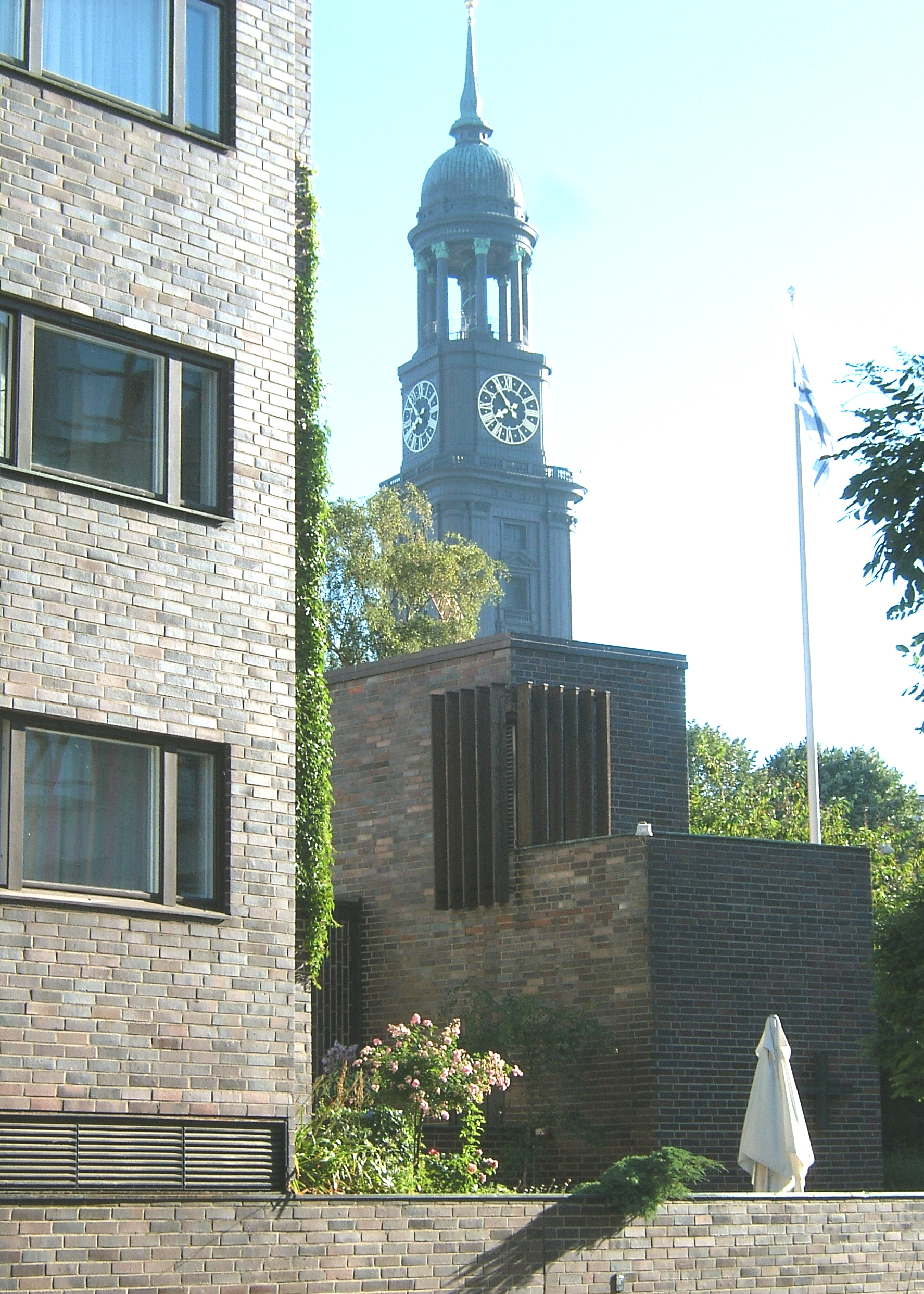
Finnish Seamen's Church, Hamburg, in front, with St. Michael's Church in the background

A branch is located in Hamburg. The mission was opened in 1901 and the current church building at Ditmar-Koel-Strasse 6 in 1966. There are two to three services at the church monthly. The church building also includes a café, a library, two saunas, and a Finnish-speaking parrot.

=== Poland ===
Branches are located in Gdańsk and Warsaw.

=== Spain ===
Active seasonal ministries are deployed to support large expat populations, particularly along the Costa del Sol.

=== Thailand ===
The Evangelical Lutheran Church of Finland has activities among Finns living abroad and traveling in Bangkok and Pattaya. Together with local Finnish communities, they aim to organize events during Advent and Christmas.

== See also ==
- British & International Sailors’ Society
- Church of Sweden Abroad
- International Christian Maritime Association
- Mission to Seafarers (Anglican)
- Sjømannskirken (Norwegian Church Abroad)
