= Adrian Wilson (book designer) =

American book designer and author

Adrian Wilson (1923–1988) was an American book designer and author of the influential 1967 work entitled The Design of Books.

== Early life and education ==
Adrian Wilson was born on 1 July 1923 in Ann Arbor, Michigan, and raised in Beverly, Massachusetts. He briefly attended Wesleyan University. He left college to join the war resistance movement, where he learned about book design and graphic design. During World War II, he was interned at Camp Angel in Waldport, Oregon, where he printed William Everson's anti-war poems for Untide Press.

After the war, he and his new wife Joyce Lancaster Wilson settled in San Francisco and helped to form the Interplayers Theater.

In 1947, he studied architecture at the University of California, Berkeley but soon left, first to join Jack Stauffacher at the Greenwood Press, and afterwards to join the University of California Press.

== Career ==
After a few yearshe left the Press accepted commissions from them for many years. In 1957, he published Printing for Theatre. One of his apprentices was printmaker Peter Rutledge Koch.

In 1958, he sold his press and, along with his wife, began a tour of Europe where they met Will Carter, John Dreyfus, Hermann Zapf, Stanley Morison, Beatrice Warde, and Giovanni Mardersteig. In 1983, he was an early recipient of a MacArthur Foundation award.

He developed an interest in early book illustration, leading to his The Making of the Nuremberg Chronicle (1976), and (with his wife) A Medieval Mirror (1984), an account of early printed editions of the Speculum Humanae Salvationis.

He died of congestive heart failure on 3 February 1988 in a hospital in San Francisco.
