= David Durham (fugitive) =

American fugitive

- Born: David Anthony Durham; March 11, 1967 (age 59)
- Disappeared: January 23, 2011; Waldport, Oregon, U.S.
- Height: 6 ft 3 in (1.91 m)

David Anthony Durham (March 11, 1967 – disappeared January 23, 2011) is an American fugitive who disappeared under mysterious circumstances after allegedly shooting and critically injuring a police officer during a traffic stop in Lincoln City, Oregon. After allegedly shooting the officer, Durham's vehicle was rendered inoperable via a spike strip 40 miles (64 km) south in Waldport, where he fled on foot and is alleged to have begun shooting at two crab fishermen in Alsea Bay before disappearing. Durham's whereabouts remain unknown.

== Disappearance ==
At approximately 10:58 pm on January 23, 2011, Lincoln City police officer Steven Dodds pulled over a 1984 Dodge pickup truck owned by David Anthony Durham, of Sauvie Island, Portland, Oregon, for a routine traffic violation in Lincoln City, Oregon. During the interaction, Durham told Dodds that he was driving to a military base in California. At some point during the traffic stop, Durham is alleged to have shot Dodds multiple times in the chest, critically injuring him, and then fled in his vehicle, heading south on Highway 101.

Responding police officers spotted Durham's vehicle in Newport, and disabled his vehicle with a spike strip near Waldport, just north of the Alsea Bay Bridge. Unable to further drive his vehicle, Durham fled on foot into the woods on the west side of the highway; Durham's dog, which was in his vehicle, fled to the east. Shortly after, two crab fishermen working by spotlight on Alsea Bay reported gunshots originating from the spit, but could not see the gunman in the darkness. Three days after Durham's disappearance, his dog was found wandering in Waldport.

== Investigation ==
An extensive search for Durham took place in the days following his disappearance by local, state and federal law enforcement officers; SWAT teams were also instated. Police performed a house-by-house search across Waldport and Bayshore, a community immediately north of Alsea Bay. Despite the extensive search, authorities were unable to locate Durham, and there have been no verified sightings of him since the evening of January 23, 2011. Initially, law enforcement theorized that Durham may have been hiding in an abandoned house in the woods or in one of the area's numerous vacant vacation homes. Another possibility raised by law enforcement was that Durham had attempted to swim across Alsea Bay and drowned.

A friend of Durham's said that in the months prior to his disappearance, he had been acting erratically and displaying signs of paranoia: "He was definitely going through something. We just didn't know how serious it was." She also added that she believed Durham was dead. Durham's brother Michael told The Oregonian that Durham had sustained a shoulder injury in the months prior to his disappearance, and had been prescribed pain medication that altered his mental state. He also stated he believed Durham may have been hiding at a house in Manzanita owned by his employer. Prior to his disappearance, Durham had told several friends and family members that he was planning on relocating to the Caribbean. His employer at Willamette Print & Blueprints Co. Inc in Portland notified police that he had failed to show up to work on Friday, January 21, and that he had not been heard from since.

== Aftermath ==
A federal arrest warrant for Durham was issued January 29, 2011 and as of December 2025 remains outstanding. Durham was profiled on the television series America's Most Wanted shortly after his disappearance.

== See also ==
- Donald Eugene Webb
- List of fugitives from justice who disappeared
