= Kermit Sheets =

American filmmaker (1915–2006)

Louis Kermit Sheets
- Kermit Sheets in the CPS days
- Born: 14 August 1915
- Died: 6 April 2006 (aged 90)
- Occupations: Writer and actor
- Known for: The Pleasure Garden

Louis Kermit Sheets (14 August 1915 – 6 April 2006) was an actor, director, playwright and an artistic partner with poet James Broughton.

== World War II ==
During World War II, Sheets served as a conscientious objector for four years, first in Civilian Public Service Camp no. 21 at Wyeth, Oregon, and then in Camp Angel near Waldport, Oregon, where he became part of a gifted group of artists, writers, and performers. In 1943 he was one of the founders of the Untide Press, which attempted to bring poetry to the public in an inexpensive but attractive format. Co-founders were writer William Everson, editor William Eshelman and architect and printer Kemper Nomland. He became a close friend of Kemper Nomland. Both men shared interest in graphical design, illustration and publication layout, although Sheets was primarily interested in theater and Norland in architecture.

Some members of this group formed a repertory known as the Interplayers after the war. Led by Sheets, the group produced and performed plays in various theaters until they obtained a home in a champagne warehouse in North Beach, San Francisco.

== Centaur Press ==
Sheets founded Centaur Press in San Francisco in 1949 working with James Broughton. The press published and distributed poetry and drama by Broughton, Anaïs Nin, Madeline Gleason and Muriel Rukeyser. Robert Duncan was one of the founders of the San Francisco Renaissance along with Kenneth Rexroth. His Medieval Scenes linked sequence of poems is a classic. The Centaur Press volume was designed by Kermit Sheets, who created the title page woodcut, and was hand set in Centaur Roman and Frederic Goudy's Deepdene italic. Sheets commissioned Adrian Wilson to print Glen Coffield's The Night is Where you Fly, illustrated by Lee Mullican.

== Film and theater ==
Kermit Sheets acted in the short films Loony Tom (1951), The Pleasure Garden (1953) and The Bed (1968), all directed by James Broughton. The Pleasure Garden was nominated for a BAFTA award and won the Best Fantastic-Poetic Film award at Cannes. British actor and later director Lindsay Anderson was among the cast members. Returning from Europe in 1955, Sheets became managing director of the San Francisco Playhouse, a position he held until the early 1960s. In 1965 Kermit married Jane Steckle, who was to be his partner for the next 34 years. Sheets was director of the Center at the Lighthouse for the Blind from 1970 to 1980. Sheets and Broughton co-directed the experimental short film The Golden Positions (1971), a meditation on and catalog of the human body in all its positions and activities. He continued to write novels and short stories after retiring.

Kermit Sheets died on 6 April 2006. A collections of his work and memorabilia is preserved by the Lewis & Clark College in Portland, Oregon.
