= Alsea (disambiguation) =

The Alsea are a Native American tribe of Oregon. Alsea may also refer to:

- Alsea (company), a Mexican restaurant business
- Alsea Bay, a body of water near the city of Waldport, Oregon
- Alsea Bay Bridge, a bridge near Waldport
- Alsea, Oregon, an unincorporated community in Oregon
- Alsea River, a river in Oregon
  - Alsea Falls, a waterfall on the Alsea River in Oregon
- Alsean languages, a language family spoken along the Oregon Coast
- USS Alsea (ATF-97), an Abnaki-class fleet ocean tug

== See also ==
- Chronicles of Alsea, a science fiction book series
