= Beachside =

A beachside is the coastal area near a beach. It may also refer to:

- Beachside Soccer Club, A youth soccer club in CT
- Beachside FC, an association football club in Hobart, Australia
- Beachside, Newfoundland and Labrador
- Beachside State Recreation Site, a park in Oregon
