= David Durham =

David Durham may refer to:

- David Anthony Durham (born 1969), American novelist
- David Durham (fugitive), American who shot a police officer and fled
- David Durham, pseudonym of William Edward Vickers (1889–1965), English writer
