= Claas Epp Jr. =

Russian Mennonite minister

Coordinates: 41.3162°N 60.4715°E

Claas Epp Jr. (21 September 1838 – 19 January 1913) was a Russian Mennonite minister known for leading his followers into Central Asia where he predicted Christ would return in 1889.

== Life ==
Epp was born in Fürstenwerder, Prussia. His family moved to the Trakt Mennonite settlement in the Russian province of Samara in 1853. He was married to Elisabeth Jantzen in 1862. Most of their twelve children died before reaching adulthood. His son, Claas Epp III migrated to Beatrice, Nebraska, in 1891, and his numerous descendants live in the United States.

The 1870s were a time of stress and transition in the Mennonite settlements of Russia. The population of the colonies was more than could be supported by available land. The Russian government announced in 1870 that it would end all special privileges granted to colonists by 1880, including the exemption from military service, which was so important to nonresistant Mennonites. Those most concerned with these changes were looking toward North America as a resettlement option. There was widespread distribution of chiliastic writings by prophetic authors such as Jung Stilling and others among the Mennonite colonies.

It was in this uncertain environment that Epp distributed a self-published book in 1877 in which he put forth his own prophetic interpretation of the Bible. Epp predicted that Christ would return in 1889 and meet the faithful in central Asia. According to Epp, his own congregation was Philadelphia of the seven churches of the Book of Revelation, which would become a doorway into heaven.

Mennonite settlers at Aulie Ata in the late 1800s.

As 1880 and the end of special privileges approached, a group of Epp's followers prepared for a trek east. A party traveled to Saint Petersburg where they obtained permission to settle near Tashkent from Konstantin Petrovich Von Kaufman, the first Governor-General of Russian Turkestan. Over a hundred families in four groups set out in summer and fall of 1880, arriving in the vicinity of Tashkent after an arduous fifteen-week journey. When they learned that the military exemption now no longer applied to Russia's Asiatic possessions, a disagreement arose among the group. Those willing to accept forestry service in lieu of military service, separated from the main group and settled at Aulie-Ata, 240 km (150 mi) northeast of Tashkent.

Epp took his group of some sixty families to Bukhara, hoping to be out of the reach of Russian jurisdiction and the associated conscription requirements. The emir of Bukhara refused to accept the settlers, sending Epp and his followers back into Turkestan. After much traveling back and forth in the border area of Bukhara and Turkestan, the group was invited to settle near the Laudan canal on the upper Amu Darya river in the Khanate of Khiva.

Their journey was at its end, but new problems arose. When nearby bandits learned that the Mennonites would not defend themselves their thievery advanced from taking horses and livestock to boldly coming into homes and taking possessions at will. As the violence escalated, a young Mennonite man was murdered, straining the group's nonviolent values. The khan offered a permanent solution by inviting the Mennonites to relocate in a walled garden called Ak Metchet a dozen kilometers southeast of Khiva.

Epp became ever more fanatical. He predicted Christ's return on 8 March 1889. When the date came and nothing happened, Epp adjusted his calculations — claiming the original date was based on a leaning clock — and corrected the year to 1891. That year passed and Epp, ever more eccentric, declared himself to be Christ's son. His congregation dwindled over the decades. Epp died in 1913 in Ak Metchet, two days after his wife's death. The community survived until 1935, and is considered by historians as a successful Mennonite settlement that was dissolved under the Soviet collectivization program.
