= Coffield =

Coffield is a surname. Notable people with the surname include:

- Darren Coffield (born 1969), British painter
- Glen Coffield (1917–1981), American poet and conscientious objector
- Kelly Coffield Park (born 1962), American actress and comedian
- Nick Coffield (born 1999), Australian football player
- Peter Coffield (1945–1983), American actor
- Randy Coffield (born 1953), American former football player

== See also ==
- Coffield Unit, a prison in Anderson County, Texas, United States
