= The Pleasure Garden (1953 film) =

British short film by James Broughton

- Directed by: James Broughton
- Written by: James Broughton
- Starring: Hattie Jacques; Lindsay Anderson; John Le Mesurier
- Music by: Stanley Bate
- Production company: Farallone Films
- Distributed by: Film Traders
- Release date: 1953
- Running time: 38 minutes
- Country: United Kingdom
- Language: English

The Pleasure Garden is a 1953 short film written and directed by James Broughton, starring Hattie Jacques, Lindsay Anderson, and John Le Mesurier.

== Plot ==
Filmed among the ruins of the Crystal Palace Terraces, The Pleasure Garden is a poetic ode to desire, featuring a bureaucrat determined to stamp out any form of free expression.

== Cast ==
- Hattie Jacques as Mrs Albion
- Diana Maddox as Bess
- Kermit Sheets as Sam
- Jean Anderson as Aunt Minerva
- John Le Mesurier as Colonel Pall K. Gargoyle
- Maxine Audley as Lady Ennui
- Derek Hart as Lord Ennui
- Jill Bennett as Miss Kellerman
- Lindsay Anderson as Michael-Angelico
- John Heawood as Mr Nurmi
- Hilary Mackendrick as Miss Wheeling
- Gladys Spencer as Mrs Jennybelle
- Gontron Goulden as Doctor Hemingway
- Victoria Grayson as Miss Greaves
- Mary Lee Settle as Mme Paganini
- Daphne Hunter as Girl in Grass

== Reception ==
The Monthly Film Bulletin wrote: "This light extravaganza by the Californian poet James Broughton, whose 16-mm films (Mothers' Day, Loony Tom, etc.) have been seen over here, was financed by private subscription and shot entirely on location in the Crystal Palace Gardens, a perfect setting. It is a highly personal mixture of lyricism, mime, whimsy and caprice; some may find it too tenuous, but those who like it will like it very much indeed. It has a freedom all too rare in the cinema, and it is all freshly, unassumingly imagined: a real, a genuine lark. Professional and non-professional actors blend homogeneously under the director's eccentric guidance, Stanley Bate's music is full of entirely appropriate gaiety and invention, and Walter Lassally's photography is resourceful and attractively framed."

== Accolades ==
The film won the Prix de Fantasie Poetique at Cannes in 1954.

== Home media ==
The Pleasure Garden was released on DVD in the UK by the BFI on 15 February 2010. The release also includes The Phoenix Tower (UK, 1957, 39 min.), a short documentary charting the construction of the BBC's Crystal Palace Television Tower, plus a fully illustrated booklet with film notes, an original review and a history of the Crystal Palace.

== See also ==
- List of avant-garde films of the 1950s
