= Beachside State Recreation Site =

Recreation area in Oregon, U.S.

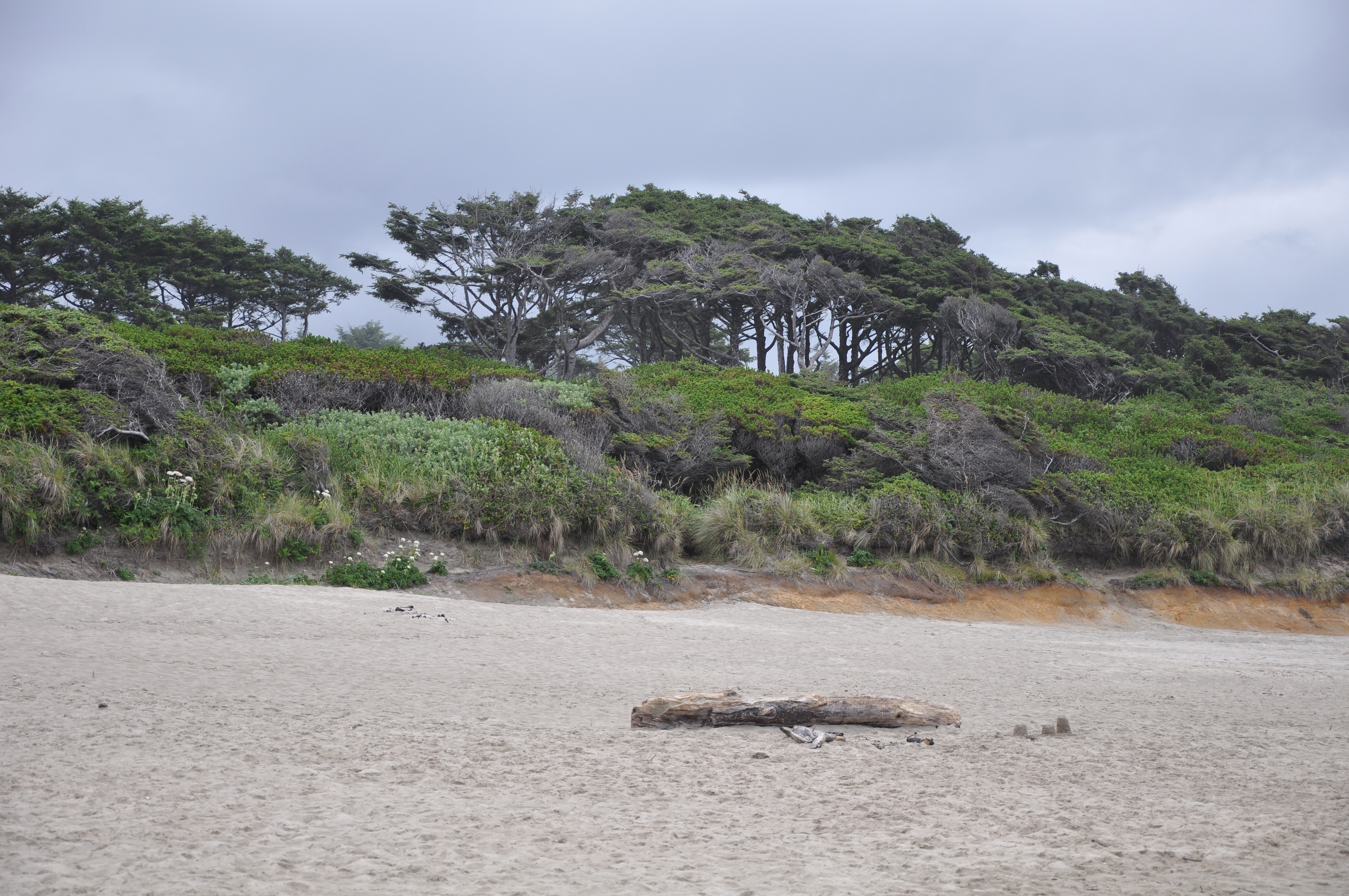
- Looking east from the beach

- Location within Oregon Location within the United States
- Interactive map of Beachside State Recreation Site
- Type: Public, state
- Location: Lincoln County, Oregon
- Nearest city: Waldport
- Coordinates: 44°22′53″N 124°05′19″W
- Operator: Oregon Parks and Recreation Department

Beachside State Recreation Site is a state park in the U.S. state of Oregon, administered by the Oregon Parks and Recreation Department.

== See also ==
- List of Oregon state parks
- Wakonda Beach State Airport
