= Lincoln City Career Technical High School =

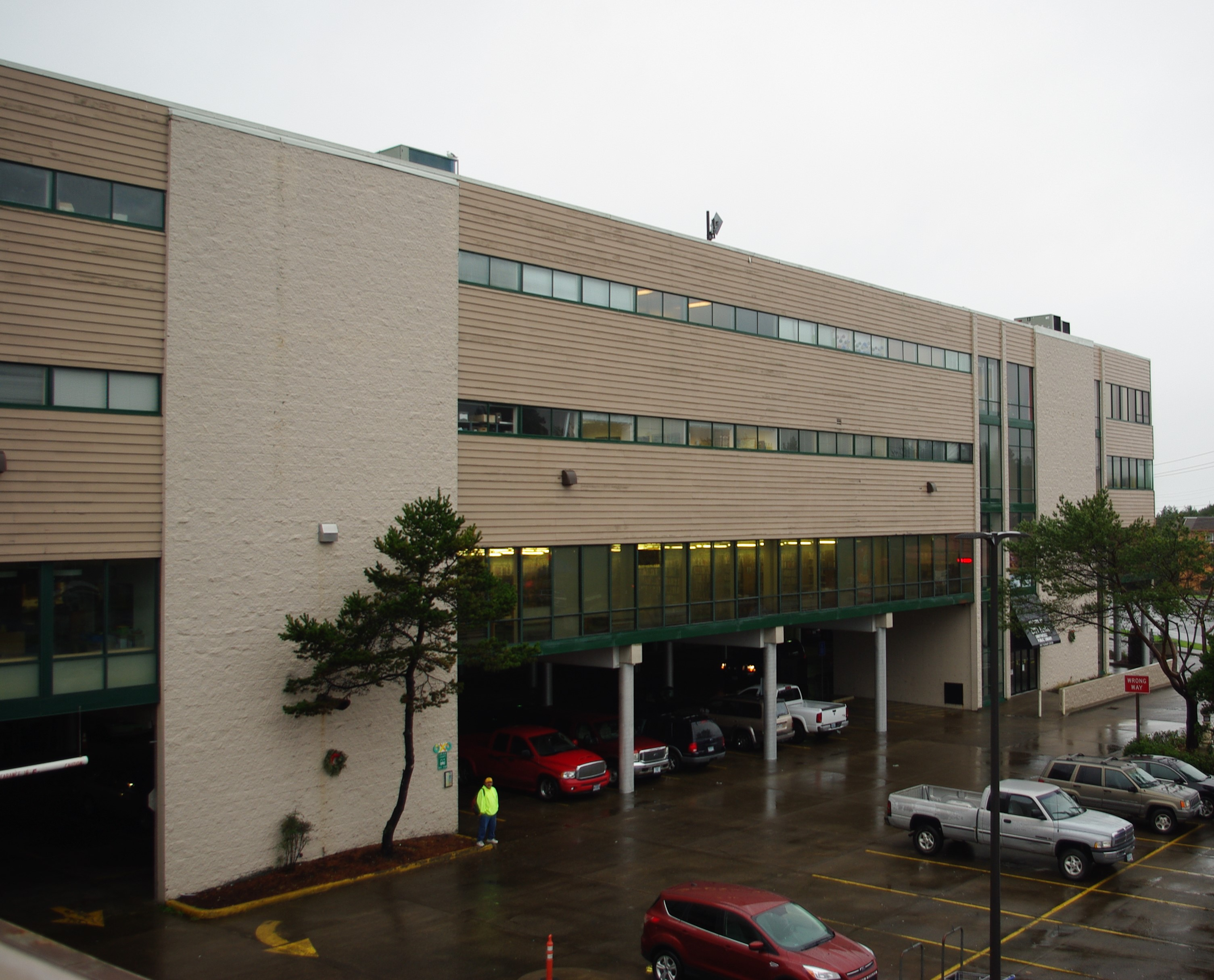

Location
- 801 SW Highway 101, Suite 404; Lincoln City, (Lincoln County), Oregon 97367; United States; 44.960947°N 124.015689°W

Information
- Type: Public
- School district: Lincoln County School District
- Principal: Sean Larsen
- Grades: 9-12
- Enrollment: 30 (2022-2023)
- Accreditation: NAAS
- Website: www.careertech.us

Lincoln City Career Technical High School was a charter high school in Lincoln City, Oregon, United States. It was created as a charter school in 2000. At one point, it was ranked by U.S. News & World Report as the second-best school in the district overall. It had a class size of 2–8, a student-teacher ratio of 5 to 1, and an academic faculty well-versed in math, science, English, and social sciences. The State of Oregon ranked its Coastal Drone Academy as the leading aviation high school program in the state (https://www.researchgate.net/publication/361913514_YOU_CAN_FLY_-_A_NEW_AVIATION_CAREER_PATHWAY_FOR_RURAL_OREGON_STUDENTS)

The school was based on work-based education, courses developed through project-based learning, integrating an advanced hybrid learning system developed by the Gates Foundation utilizing onsite tutors/instructors assisted with an online academic instructional platform. The emphasis of day-to-day operations included the school as a simulated workplace, emphasizing job-finding, skill development, and engagement in higher-paying jobs. The Northwest Association of Accredited Schools has accredited the school since 1996.

== Academics ==
In 2019, Career Tech had 54 students and 11 staff for a 5:1 student-to-teacher ratio.
