= Waldport High School =

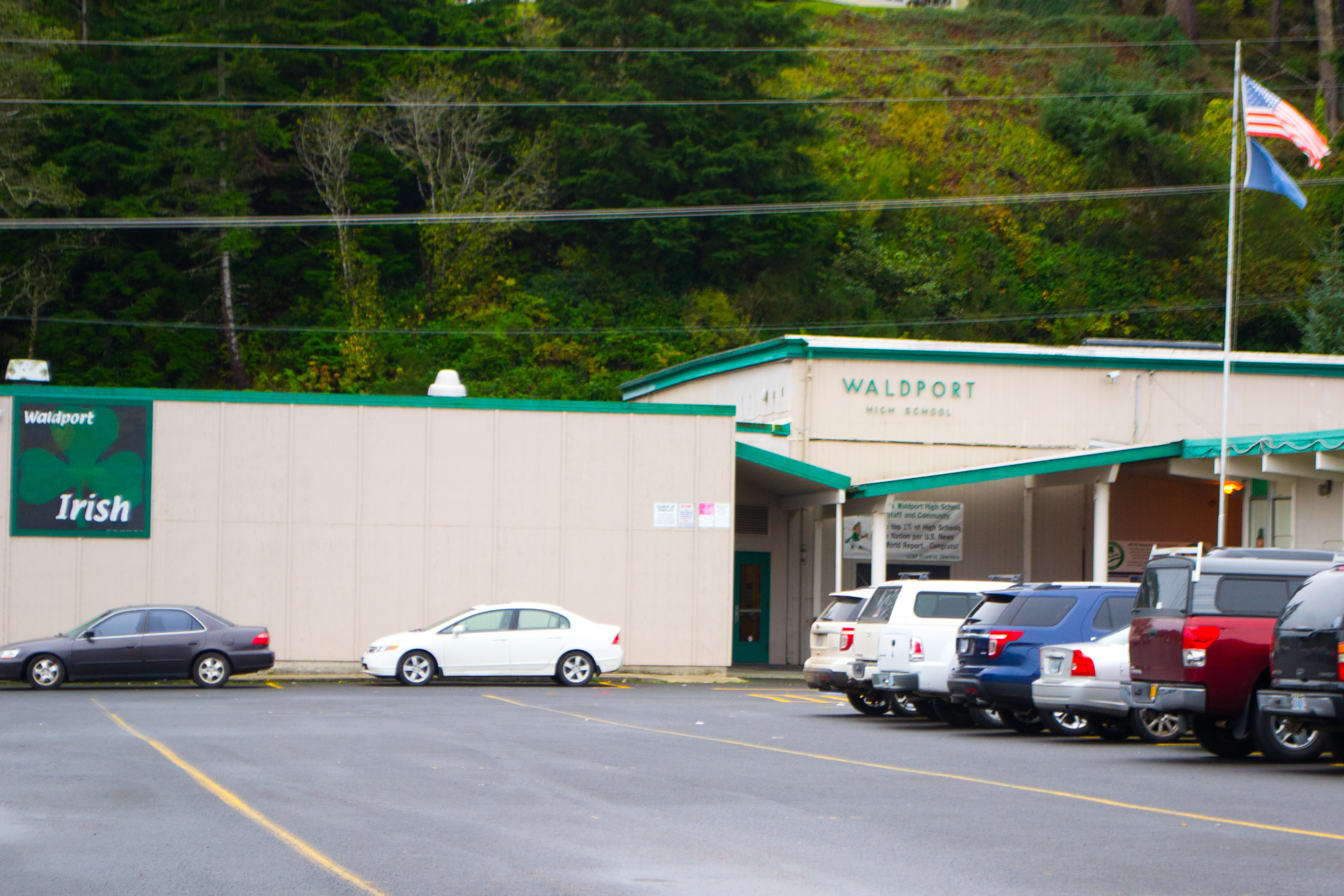

Location
- 3000 S Crestline Dr. Waldport, (Lincoln County), Oregon 97394; United States; 44.427568°N 124.059007°W

Information
- Type: Public
- Opened: 1958
- School district: Lincoln County School District
- CEEB code: 381220
- NCES School ID: 410750000667
- Principal: Sandy Battles
- Grades: 9-12
- Enrollment: 187 (2023-2024)
- Colors: Kelly green, white, and black
- Athletics conference: OSAA 2A-3 Valley Coast Conference
- Mascot: Irish
- Website: Waldport High School website

Waldport High School is a public high school in Waldport, Oregon, United States. It opened in 1958. For the 2011–2012 school year, Waldport High reported enrolling 208 students. The school is part of the Lincoln County School District.

== Academics ==
In 2008, 89% of the school's seniors received a high school diploma. Of 55 seniors, 49 graduated, four dropped out, and two continued their high school education.

In 2009, the school placed in the top 1% of United States high schools in test scores.

In 2010 Waldport became home to the west campus for the Oregon Coast Community College.

Waldport High School has had the highest standardized test scores for English within the Lincoln County School District

== Old high school ==
In 2013, prior to the start of the school year, a new campus was built at 3000 Crestline Drive. The old high school at 320 Lower Crestline Drive was turned into a training facility for police and fire departments during the months of September, October, and November. On November 23 and 24, 2013, the building was burned to the ground in a controlled burn to provide hands-on experience for several different fire departments.
