= Wakonda Beach State Airport =

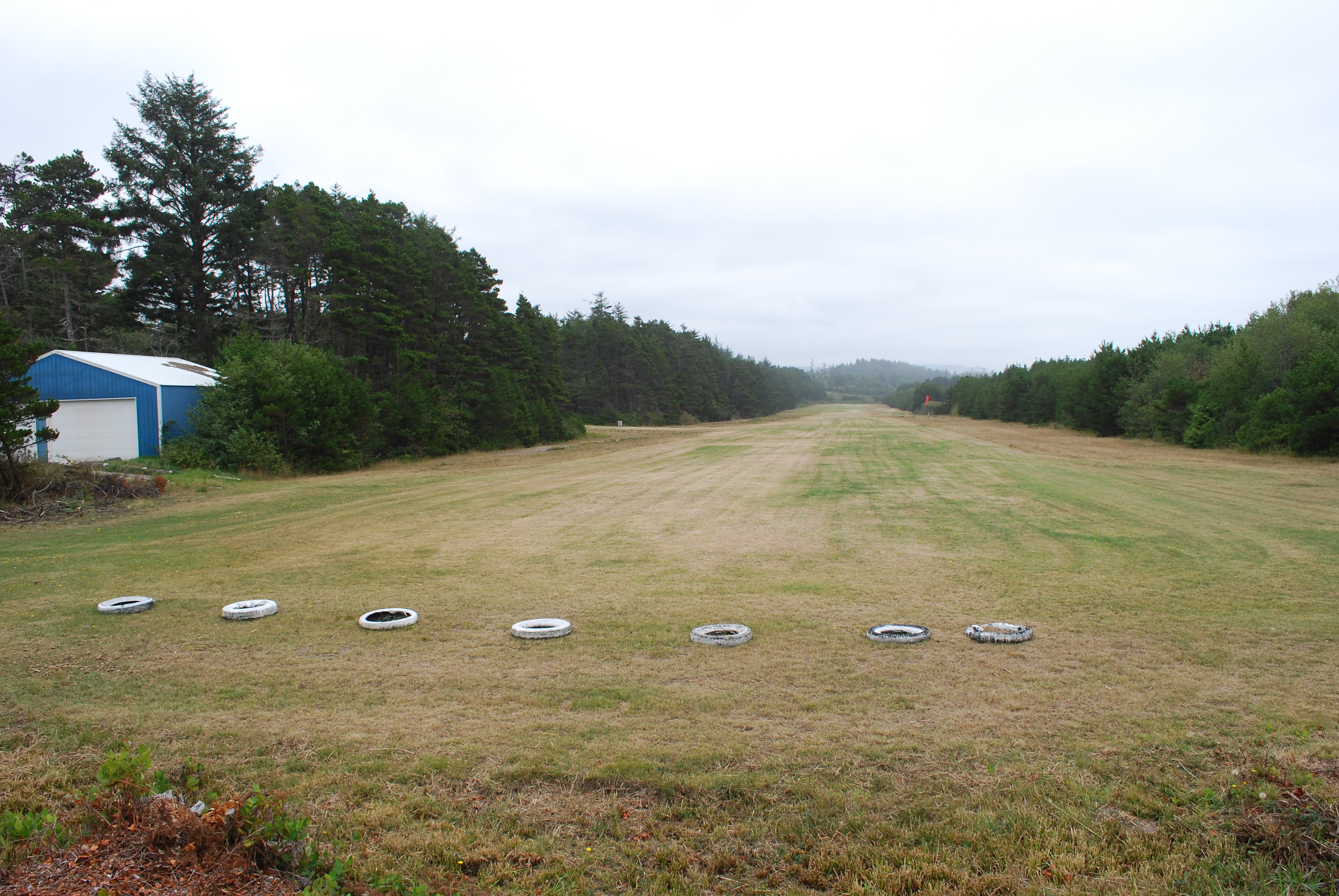
- IATA: none; ICAO: FAA: R33

Summary
- Airport type: Public
- Operator: Oregon Department of Aviation
- Location: Waldport, Oregon, United States
- Elevation AMSL: 41 ft / 12 m
- Coordinates: 44°23′04.4300″N 124°05′06.43″W
- Interactive map of Wakonda Beach State Airport

Runways
Direction	Length		Surface
Direction	ft	m	Surface
16/34	2,000	610	Turf

Wakonda Beach State Airport (FAA LID: R33) is a public General aviation airport located three miles (4.8 km) southwest of Waldport, Oregon. The airport is located a short walk from Beachside State Recreation Site.
