= Siletz Valley Early College Academy =

Location
- 245 NW James Franks Avenue; Siletz, (Lincoln County), Oregon 97380; United States
- 44.723395°N 123.92032°W

Information
- Type: Public
- Opened: 2006
- School district: Lincoln County School District
- Principal: Sam Tupou
- Grades: 9-12
- Enrollment: 66
- Athletics conference: OSAA Mountain West League 1A-3
- Mascot: Warrior
- Website: www.siletzvalleyschools.org

Siletz Valley Early College Academy, also known as Siletz Valley School, is a public charter high school in Siletz, Oregon, United States. The school opened in 2006 with funding from the Chinook Winds Casino and from a grant provided by the Bill and Melinda Gates Foundation.

The previous Siletz Valley High School was operated by the Lincoln County School District and closed in 1983. Jayson Jacoby of the Baker City Herald characterized the 2006 charter school opening as Siletz Valley High re-opening.

== Academics ==
In 2008, 67% of the school's seniors received a high school diploma. Of 21 students, 14 graduated, five dropped out, and two were still in high school the following year.
