= Untide Press =

The Untide Press, founded in 1943, attempted to bring poetry to the public in an inexpensive but attractive format. It was founded by writer William Everson, architect and printer Kemper Nomland, actor Kermit Sheets, printer/painter Larry Siemons and editor / librarian William Eshelman, in a camp of conscientious objectors in Waldport, Oregon in 1943. The name was a challenge to the official camp magazine the Tide Press. Camp Angel was a Civilian Public Service (CPS) camp, one of many camps across the United States where conscientious objectors were given unpaid jobs of "national importance" as a substitute for World War II military service. Camp Angel was unique as the only Fine Arts Program camp in the entire CPS system.

The Untide Press developed a reputation for high-quality writing and innovative design. Writers included William Everson, Glen Coffield, Jacob Sloan, George Woodcock, John Walker, and Kenneth Patchen. William Everson said that "those of us of Untide rank among our biggest moments in CPS the completion of a book, and the very real sense of achievement it occasions."

The press produced the Illiterati magazine on an erratic schedule, and published several small books of poems. All work was set by hand. Many of the poets and writers later formed the nucleus of the San Francisco literary renaissance. The last book produced at the Untide Press in Waldport was Kenneth Patchen's An Astonished Eye Looks Out Of the Air, printed via letterpress in 1945 as the war was ending.
