= Lincoln County School District (Oregon) =

Public school district in Oregon, United States

Location
- Lincoln County, Oregon United States
- Coordinates: 44.63250°N 124.05749°W

District information
- Type: Public
- Motto: "Quality Learning for All."
- Grades: K-12
- Established: 1923
- Superintendent: Dr. Majalise Tolan
- Asst. superintendent(s): Sara Johnson
- Schools: 16 total 12 regular schools 4 public charter schools
- Budget: $58,504,000
- NCES District ID: 4107500

Students and staff
- Students: 5,187
- Teachers: 239.18
- Staff: 502.80
- Student–teacher ratio: 21.69
- Athletic conference: Oregon School Activities Association

Other information
- Total Population Under 18: 9,547
- Guiding philosophy: "Continuous Improvement"
- Mission: "To develop passionate learners and responsible citizens."
- Schedule: lincoln.k12.or.us/Page.asp?NavID=3306
- Website: lincoln.k12.or.us

The Lincoln County School District is a public school district in the U.S. state of Oregon. The district serves the communities of Yachats, Waldport, Eddyville, Newport, Siletz, Lincoln City and Toledo. The district spans roughly 55 miles of the central Oregon Coast from Cascade Head south to Cape Perpetua, and encompasses about 1,000 square miles.

== Demographics ==
Over half of the students in the district qualify for free or reduced lunch.

In the 2009 school year, the district had 484 students classified as homeless by the Department of Education, which was 9.0% of students in the district.

== Governance ==
Lincoln County School District elects five Board of Education members to do a variety of district operations such as appointing a superintendent to run day-to-day operations in the school district. The current board members are Peter Vince (Chair), Mitch Parsons, Natalie Schaefer, Jason Malloy, and Dave Cowden. The current superintendent is Majalise Tolan.

== High schools ==
- Lincoln City Career Technical High School (Lincoln City)
- Newport High School (Newport)
- Taft High School (Lincoln City)
- Toledo High School (Toledo)
- Waldport High School (Waldport)

== Middle/junior high schools ==
- Crestview Heights School (Waldport) (K-8)
- Isaac Newton Magnet School (shares campus with Newport Intermediate School)
- Newport Preparatory Academy (shares campus with Newport High School)
- Taft Middle School (shares campus with Taft High School)
- Toledo Junior High School (shares campus with Toledo High School)

Prior to 1985 the district called its lower secondary schools "junior high schools". In 1985, the district changed their names to "middle schools", and Lincoln Junior High School was renamed to Newport Middle School.

== Elementary schools ==
- Newport Intermediate School (Newport) (4-6)
- Oceanlake Elementary School (Lincoln City) (K-2)
- Sam Case Elementary (Newport) (K-3)
- Taft Elementary School (Lincoln City) (3-6)
- Toledo Elementary School (Toledo) (K-6)

== Former schools ==
- The district closed Siletz Valley High School in 1983. It reopened as a charter school in 2006.

== Contracts ==
As of 2011, Lincoln Country School District contracts with Sodexo for custodial and food services, and (as of 2019/2020 school year) with First Student for transportation services.
