= William Robert Eshelman =

American librarian

William Robert Eshelman (1921–2004) was an American pacifist, editor, and librarian. He was active in causes such as preventing censorship, ending racial segregation and stopping the Vietnam war, while gaining distinction in his professional career.

== Career ==
As a conscientious objector during World War II, he was conscripted into the Civilian Public Service at Camp 56 (Camp Angel) in Oregon. He co-founded the Untide Press in 1943 with poet William Everson, architect and printer Kemper Nomland and actor Kermit Sheets. The press had the aim of bringing poetry to the public in an inexpensive but attractive format. The name was a challenge to the official camp magazine the Tide Press.

Eshelman was on the faculty of Los Angeles State College from 1951 to 1965, and was college librarian from 1959 to 1965. He demonstrated the belief of his mentor, Lawrence Clark Powell, that librarians would not gain faculty status until they achieved "intellectual camaraderie with the faculty." The faculty of L.A. State College elected him to the Academic Senate, the first librarian to serve on that body. While he was editor of the California Librarian, the magazine earned the H. W. Wilson Library Periodical Award for the best state or regional journal. He chaired the California Library Association Intellectual Freedom Committee which opposed censorship efforts of lawmakers, initiated the Fiske study of self-censorship in school libraries, and joined the national journals in their efforts to support the desegregation of public libraries in the South.

From 1965 to 1968 Eshelman was librarian and professor of bibliography at Bucknell University. He joined with other librarians to become active in major protests against the Vietnam War.

Eshelman was editor of Wilson Library Bulletin from 1968 through 1978, adding to the distinction of the magazine and its role as one of the two leading independent library publications in America.

He was appointed president of Scarecrow Press from 1979 until his retirement in 1985.

Eshelman served on the editorial board of Choice Magazine, published by the American Library Association (ALA).

He served on the ALA Council and on the ALA Committee on Accreditation.

== Death ==
William Eshelman died on 9 August 2004 at his home in Portland, Oregon, aged 82.

== Selected publications ==
- Eshelman, William R. (January 1970). "State of the Art: An Editor's Mixed Emotions". Wilson Library Bulletin. 44 (5): 538–43.
- William Everson; Lawrence Clark Powell; William R. Eshelman (1994). William R. Eshelman (ed.). Take hold upon the future: letters on writers and writing, 1938-1946. Scarecrow Press. ISBN 0-8108-2878-2.
- William R. Eshelman (1997). No silence!: a library life. Scarecrow Press. ISBN 0-8108-3241-0.
