= Camp Angel =

Civilian Public Service camp for conscientious objectors during World War II

Coordinates: 44.3650°N 124.0859°W

Camp Angel was Civilian Public Service (CPS) camp number 56, located from 1942 to 1945 near Waldport and the coast in the Siuslaw National Forest and Lincoln County, in western Oregon.

It was one of many CPS camps across the United States where conscientious objectors (COs) were given unpaid jobs of "national importance" as a substitute for World War II military service. Camp Angel was unique as the only Fine Arts Program camp in the CPS system. Between 1942 and 1945, Camp Angel's Fine Arts Program sponsored production of original plays and publication of books by the COs. When the war was over, notable objectors including poet William Everson, actor/writer Kermit Sheets and dramatist Martin Ponch relocated to the San Francisco Bay Area and launched what became known as the San Francisco Renaissance, profoundly influencing the Beat Generation.

== History ==
For many of the COs, their time at the camp was a period of great creativity.

William Everson, architect and printer Kemper Nomland, Kermit Sheets and William R. Eshelman founded the Untide Press at the camp in 1943, with the aim of bringing poetry to the public in an inexpensive but attractive format. The name was a challenge to the official camp magazine the Tide Press. The Untide Press developed a reputation for high-quality writing and innovative design. Writers included William Everson, Glen Coffield, Jacob Sloan, George Woodcock, John Walker, and Kenneth Patchen. William Everson said that "those of us of Untide rank among our biggest moments in CPS the completion of a book, and the very real sense of achievement it occasions."

Kemper Nomland created portraits of others at the camp including Glen Coffield, Windsor Utley, and Bill Webb, several of which are held in a collection at Lewis and Clark College. One of his paintings was published in two of Coffield's books as well as The Illiterati camp magazine. Nomland also provided the illustrations for William Everson's War elegies, published by Untide Press in 1944. Kermit Sheets wrote the satirical plays Mikado in CPS and Stalingrad Stalemate while in the camp. Glen Coffield published his first collection of poems Ultimatum (1943), a one-man operation since he was author, typist, designer and illustrator. His anthology Horned Moon was published by the Untide Press in 1944, and several of his poems were also published in The Illiterati.

== See also ==
- Civilian Public Service
- Civilian Conservation Corps in Oregon
