= Glen Coffield =

American writer (1917–1981)

- Born: June 5, 1917; Prescott, Arizona, United States
- Died: June 16, 1981 (aged 64); Mt. Vernon, Missouri, US
- Resting place: Park Cemetery, Carthage, Missouri, US
- Education: Central Missouri State Teachers College (B.S.)
- Occupation: Poet

Glenn Stemmons Coffield (June 5, 1917 – June 16, 1981) was an American poet and conscientious objector. He was born in Prescott, Arizona, and received a B.S. degree in education from Central Missouri State Teachers College in 1940. During World War II, he served in Civilian Public Service (CPS) Camp #7 in Magnolia, Arkansas, and then was transferred to the Camp Angel CPS camp near Waldport, Oregon in 1942. Coffield is sometimes called Oregon's first hippie.

The artist Kemper Nomland was at Camp Angel, and attempted to capture Coffield's creativity in a painting donated to the Lewis and Clark College in Portland, Oregon. Coffield's first collection of poems Ultimatum (1943) was a one-man operation since he was author, typist, designer and illustrator, as with most of his subsequent works. His anthology Horned Moon was published by Everson's Untide Press in 1944. In the poem Indivisible he describes the world as more loosely strung than a nation, feeling pain more slowly "as when wild horses stampede on broken hooves". Some of his poems were also published in the Untide Press magazine Illiterati.

After the war Coffield did some acting in San Francisco with a repertory called The Interplayers led by Kermit Sheets. From 1947–1954 he ran the Grundtvig Folk School at Eagle Creek in the Mount Hood wilderness in Oregon, where he published numerous small poetry journals and newsletters. In the 1960s Coffield moved back to San Francisco, where he was severely injured in a hit and run accident. Coffield spent the rest of his life in Missouri, and died in Mt. Vernon.

== Selected bibliography ==
- Songs for the winds 1941 – 74 pages
- Ultimatum: (from the unforgettable) Untide Press – 1943 – 10 pages
- The horned moon 1944 – 29 pages
- A pewee's note: (poems: 1944) 1946 – 16 pages
- The modern problem 1946 – 14 pages
- Poetics (a summary) 1946 – 8 pages
- The horse of summer 1946 – 26 pages
- We think too much 1948 – 22 pages
- The citadel (of the mind) 1948 – 14 pages
- The waldport dilemma: (a second look) 1948 – 12 pages
- The Grundtvig Folk School in Oregon: a creative experiment in education Free schools – 1949 – 8 pages
- The night is where you fly: poems 1949 – 35 pages
- Selected poems (1943–1950) 1951 – 56 pages
- The silent waters 1950 – 53 pages
- Three songs Rounce & Coffin Club – 1951 – 12 pages
- Love and reason Reason – 1953 – 44 pages
- Silence and slow time (a snowscape): a poem for Christmas 1953 – 8 pages
- Northwest poems 1954 – 36 pages
- Criteria for poetry 1954 – 45 pages
- The old man who liked cats: (or Abra-Ki-Dabra-Ki-Boodle-Ki-Zam) 1954 – 14 pages
- Northwest prints 1954 – 10 pages
- Homage to King Lear: (a limerick sequence in five acts) 1954 – 34 pages
- The metaphysics of wrong numbers 1955 – 22 pages
- Rational power 1955 – 39 pages
- Christmas tide, 1954–1955 1955 – 4 pages
- New age anthology of poetry 1955 – 104 pages
- Tea leaves and transit lines: poems of prophecy and technic 1956 – 14 pages
- Sea climate and other poems 1956 – 14 pages
- The Grundtvig experiment Free schools – 1957 – 58 pages
- The Grundtvig poems 1957
- The bridge editorials 1957 – 36 pages
- Bridge anthology 1957 – 22 pages
- Twelve selected poems 1958 – 12 pages
- Bay area poems 1958 – 8 pages
- Glenn Stemmons Coffield's art coloring book 1958 – 24 pages
- Definition of God, and other poems 1960 – 12 pages
- Creative method: technical essays 1960 – 110 pages
- Thirty poems: The return and other poems 1963 – 37 pages
- Poetry workshop: (thirty exercises in poetics) 1963 – 30 pages
- The merry-go-round: (poems) 1969 – 32 pages
- Thinking: (poems) 1975 – 30 pages
