= William Everson (poet) =

American poet (1912–1994)

William "Bill" Everson, also known as Brother Antoninus (September 10, 1912 – June 3, 1994), was an American poet, literary critic, teacher and small press printer. He was a member of the San Francisco Renaissance.

== Beginnings ==
Everson was born on September 10, 1912, in Sacramento, California. His parents, both of whom were printers, raised him on a farm outside the small fruit-growing town of Selma, California. He played football at Selma High School and attended Fresno State College (later known as California State University, Fresno).

== Poet and teacher ==
Everson was an influential member of the San Francisco Renaissance in poetry and worked closely with Kenneth Rexroth during this period of his life. Throughout his life, Everson was a great admirer of the work and life of poet Robinson Jeffers. Much of his work as a critic was done on Jeffers's poetry.

Everson married his childhood sweetheart Edwa Poulson on Memorial Day weekend in 1938. Edwa worked as a school teacher and they acquired some farmland. The couple did not want children, and in February 1940 Edwa accompanied Everson when he had a vasectomy performed by the physician of a friend.

Everson registered as an anarchist and a pacifist with his draft board, in compliance with the 1940 draft bill. In 1943, he was sent to a Civilian Public Service (CPS) work camp for conscientious objectors in Oregon. In Camp Angel at Waldport, Oregon, with other poets, artists and actors such as Kemper Nomland, William Eshelman, Kermit Sheets, Vlad Dupre, Glen Coffield, George Woodcock and Kenneth Patchen, he founded a fine-arts program in which the CPS men staged plays and poetry-readings and learned the craft of fine printing. More on this camp experience can be found in the book "Here on the Edge" by Steve McQuiddy. During his time as a conscientious objector, Everson completed The Residual Years, a volume of poems that launched him to national fame.

During his time at Camp Angel, Everson's wife Edwa began a relationship with another man. This led to an eventual divorce, when the two could not reconcile.

Everson married poet Mary Fabilli on June 12, 1948, separated from her on June 30, 1949, and divorced her years later on May 13, 1963. Influenced by her religious devotion, Everson converted to Catholicism. Everson joined the Catholic Church in 1951 and soon became involved with the Catholic Worker Movement in Oakland, California.

He took the name Brother Antoninus when he joined the Dominican Order in 1951 in Oakland. He joined as a donatus, a lay brother - "who is not under any particular vow and who may be asked to leave, or choose to leave, at any time; he is little more, from a theological standpoint, than a worker wearing a habit." He printed the unfinished Novum Psalterium PII XII, an acknowledged masterpiece in American fine press printing. A colorful literary and counterculture figure, he was nicknamed the Beat Friar. The central motif throughout all of Antoninus' Catholic poetry is Incarnation, the central symbol of the Christian mystery.

In 1956, he met an English Dominican, Father Victor White, at St. Albert's Dominican priory. White, of the English Dominican province and a longtime friend of Carl Jung, with whom he maintained a voluminous correspondence, was resident lecturer and theologian there. It was through this relationship to Victor White that Antoninus learned to look at his dreams from an in-depth religious angle for meaning. He devoured the Collected Works of Jung and began his psychological analysis of the unconscious as well as the analysis of many individuals who came to him for counseling. Antoninus wrote the first draft of his long erotic poem River-Root / A Syzygy, which he considered to be his most prophetic work. As Everson said in an interview for Creation magazine, with its founder and editor, the theologian and (at the time) fellow Dominican Matthew Fox, he saw "River-Root" as a kind of re-writing of the Song of Songs, bringing frank Eros back into the Psalms and undoing Christianity's longstanding separation of the sexual from the spiritual.

At St Albert's, where he had practiced as a spiritual counselor, Antoninus had given counseling to a young woman named Susanna Rickson. On December 7, 1969 - the day after the disastrous Altamont Free Concert featuring the Rolling Stones - after a reading at the University of California at Davis, Antoninus removed his religious habit and announced that he was going to be married.

Susanna Rickson then became his young bride and William Everson became the stepfather of Susanna's son, Jude.

When Brother Antoninus wrote The Rose of Solitude, he saw it published in many magazines. However, when he wrote The Veritable Years under the name William Everson, having left Antoninus behind, he couldn't even get his work reviewed. He then assumed the mantle, and a buckskin vest and bear-claw necklace to signify it, of the poet-shaman to replace his religious habit. The 1974 poem Man-Fate explores this transformation from Brother Antoninus into William Everson, the West-Coast poet-shaman.

Everson was diagnosed with Parkinson's disease in 1972.

Everson spent his remaining years living near the central California coast in Swanton, California, a few miles north of Santa Cruz, in a cabin he dubbed Kingfisher Flat. He was poet-in-residence at the University of California, Santa Cruz during the 1970s and 1980s. There he founded the Lime Kiln Press, a small press through which he printed highly sought-after fine-art editions of his own poetry as well as of the works of other poets, including Robinson Jeffers and Walt Whitman.

Everson maintained his Catholic faith until his final days. In 1982, Everson wrote an introduction to Victor White's book God and the Unconscious. In the final two years of his life, Everson worked on an unfinished autobiographical work titled Dust Shall Be the Serpent's Food.

Everson died at his home on June 3, 1994, and his body was buried at the Dominican Cemetery in Benicia, California.

Everson's papers are archived at the William Andrews Clark Memorial Library at UCLA and The Bancroft Library at UC Berkeley.

Black Sparrow Press released a three-volume series of the collected poems of Everson, the last volume was published in 2000. In 2003, the California Legacy Project published Dark God of Eros: A William Everson Reader.

== Selected bibliography ==
=== Poetry ===
- There Are the Ravens (1935). San Leandro, CA: Greater Western Publishing.
- San Joaquin (1939). Los Angeles: The Ward Ritchie Press.
- The Masculine Dead (1942). Prairie City, Illinois: Decker Press.
- War Elegies (1944). Waldport, Oregon: Untide Press.
- The Residual Years (1948). New York: New Directions.
- A Privacy of Speech (1949). Berkeley: The Equinox Press.
- The Crooked Lines of God (1959). Detroit: University of Detroit Press.
- The Hazards of Holiness (1962). Garden City, NY: Doubleday.
- The Poet is Dead: a Memorial for Robinson Jeffers (1964). San Francisco: Auerhahn Press.
- The Blowing of the Seed (1966). New Haven: Henry W. Wenning.
- Single Source: The Early Poems of William Everson, 1934-1940 (1966). Berkeley: Oyez.
- In the Fictive Wish (1967). Berkeley: Oyez.
- The Rose of Solitude (1967). Garden City, NY: Doubleday.
- The Springing of the Blade (1968) Reno, Nevada: The Black Rock Press.
- A Canticle to the Water Birds (1968). Berkeley: Eizo.
- The City Does Not Die (1969). Berkeley: Oyez.
- The Last Crusade (1969). Berkeley: Oyez.
- Who Is She That Looketh Forth as the Morning (1972). Santa Barbara: Capricorn Press.
- Tendril in the Mesh (1973). Aromas, California: Cayucos Books.
- Black Hills (1973). San Francisco: Didymus Press.
- Man-Fate: The Swan Song of Brother Antoninus (1974). New York: New Directions (W.W. Norton)
- River-Root: A Syzygy for the Bicentennial of These States (1976). Berkeley: Oyez.
- The Veritable Years, 1949-1966 (1978). Santa Barbara: Black Sparrow Press.
- Blame It On The Jet Stream (1978). Santa Cruz: The Lime Kiln Press.
- The Masks Of Drought (1980). Santa Barbara: Black Sparrow Press.
- Birth of a Poet (1982). Santa Barbara: Black Sparrow Press
- The Tarantella Rose (1995). Santa Cruz: Peter and Donna Thomas.
- The Integral Years (2000). Santa Barbara: Black Sparrow Press

=== Autobiography and interviews ===
- William Everson: The Shaman's Call, Interviews, Introduction, and Commentaries by Steven Herrmann (2009). New York, NY: Eloquent Books. ISBN 978-1-60860-604-7
- Prodigious Thrust (1996). Santa Rosa, California: Black Sparrow Press.
- William Everson: The Light the Shadow Casts. Five Interviews with William Everson. Edited and introduced by Clifton Ross. (1996). Devon, England: Stride Publications.
- Naked Heart: Talking on Poetry, Mysticism, and the Erotic (1992). Albuquerque: University of New Mexico, College of Arts and Sciences.
- Take Hold Upon the Future: Letters on Writers and Writing, 1938-1946 (1994). Metuchen, NJ: Scarecrow Press.
- On Printing (1992). San Francisco: Book Club of California.
- "William Everson: Nature Mystic and Poet Prophet," in Conversation with Matthew Fox. (1989). In Creation, Vol. 5, No. 3, September/October, 1989, pp. 10-14.

=== Literary criticism ===
- Robinson Jeffers: Fragments of an Older Fury (1968) Berkeley: Oyez.
- Archetype West: The Pacific Coast as a Literary Region (1976). Berkeley: Oyez.
- Dionysus and the Beat: Four Letters on the Archetype (1977). Santa Barbara: Black Sparrow Press.
- The Excesses of God: Robinson Jeffers as a Religious Figure (1988). Stanford, California: Stanford University Press.

== Sources ==
- Koch, Peter Rutledge, (Autumn 2010) 'Three Philosophical Printers William Everson, Jack Stauffacher, and Adrian Wilson', in Parenthesis; 19, p. 12-17
- Gelpi, Albert. Dark God of Eros: A William Everson Reader. Berkeley, CA: Heyday. 2003.
- Bartlett, Lee. William Everson: The Life of Brother Antoninus. New York: New Directions, 1988.
- Bartlett, Lee, and Campo, Allan. "William Everson: A Descriptive Bibliography, 1934-1976". Metuchen, NJ: Scarecrow Press. 1977.
- Herrmann, Steven. William Everson: The Shaman's Call, Expanded Edition. USA / Singapore: Strategic Books Rights and Publishing Co., 2016. ISBN 978-1-68181-179-6
