= Forestry service (Russia) =

Alternative to military service for Mennonites (1881–1918)

The forestry service was a form of alternative service offered to German speaking Mennonites in lieu of military service in Russia from 1881 to 1918. At its peak during World War I, 7,000 men served in forestry and agricultural pest control in Ukraine and South Russia. The program ended in the turmoil of the Russian Revolution.

== Background ==
Nonresistant Mennonites from West Prussia started settling in Russia in 1789, induced by land and special privileges including exemption from military service. By 1870 their population had grown to over 45,000 and was a significant economic force in south Russia. In 1870 the government announced that special privileges enjoyed by all colonists would end by 1880. Mennonite leaders sent delegations to Saint Petersburg for three successive years, but failed to retain the military exemption they so valued.

With loss of privileges looking likely, emigration to North America was promoted as a viable alternative. Realizing that 40,000 of Russia's most industrious farmers were preparing to leave for North America, the Russian government sent Eduard Totleben to the colonies in May 1874. Meeting with community leaders, he exaggerated the difficulties that would be encountered in North America and promised some form of alternative to military service. His intervention convinced the more liberal Mennonites to stay in Russia. After negotiations with the government in 1880 over acceptable types of alternative service, the forestry service program was deemed the best of the alternatives because it would have no military connection.

== Structure ==
The forestry service began in 1881, after the end of special privileges granted to colonists in Russia. Men served in large groups for four years planting and caring for trees on the steppes of South Russia. Phylloxera units in Crimea focused on eradicating harmful insects from vineyards. Mennonite congregations provided for housing, feeding and all other necessities of the men. The Russian government provided supervision of the projects, tools needed for the job and paid each man 20 kopeks (a minimal amount) per work day.

Just as Mennonite colonies were insulated from Russian society, the forestry camps were also sheltered from outside contact. Mennonite congregations provided a pastor and a superintendent to oversee each camp. The expense of running the camps, which included constructing barracks, was quite high. Voluntary contributions from Mennonite congregations, who had an incentive to provide an alternative to military service, were sufficient to run the program for nearly three decades.

Initially about four hundred men served in this program annually. By 1913 up to a thousand were serving and during World War I, 7000. A similar program allowed Mennonite men to serve in hospital units and transport wounded from the battlefield to Moscow and Ekaterinoslav hospitals.

== Demobilization ==
The forestry units functioned right up to the Russian Revolution of 1917. The camps became impossible to maintain in the chaos of South Russia and the assets, all church property, were sold and camps closed in 1918 with the Treaty of Brest-Litovsk. Alternatives to military service remained available, but under military control, until 1936.

== Epilogue ==
The lessons learned with respect to providing an alternate to military service for conscientious objectors was a model for Civilian Public Service in the United States during World War II. Peace churches almost exclusively financed Civilian Public Service, while draftees served in forestry, agricultural and other types of units.
