= Waldport, Oregon =

- City
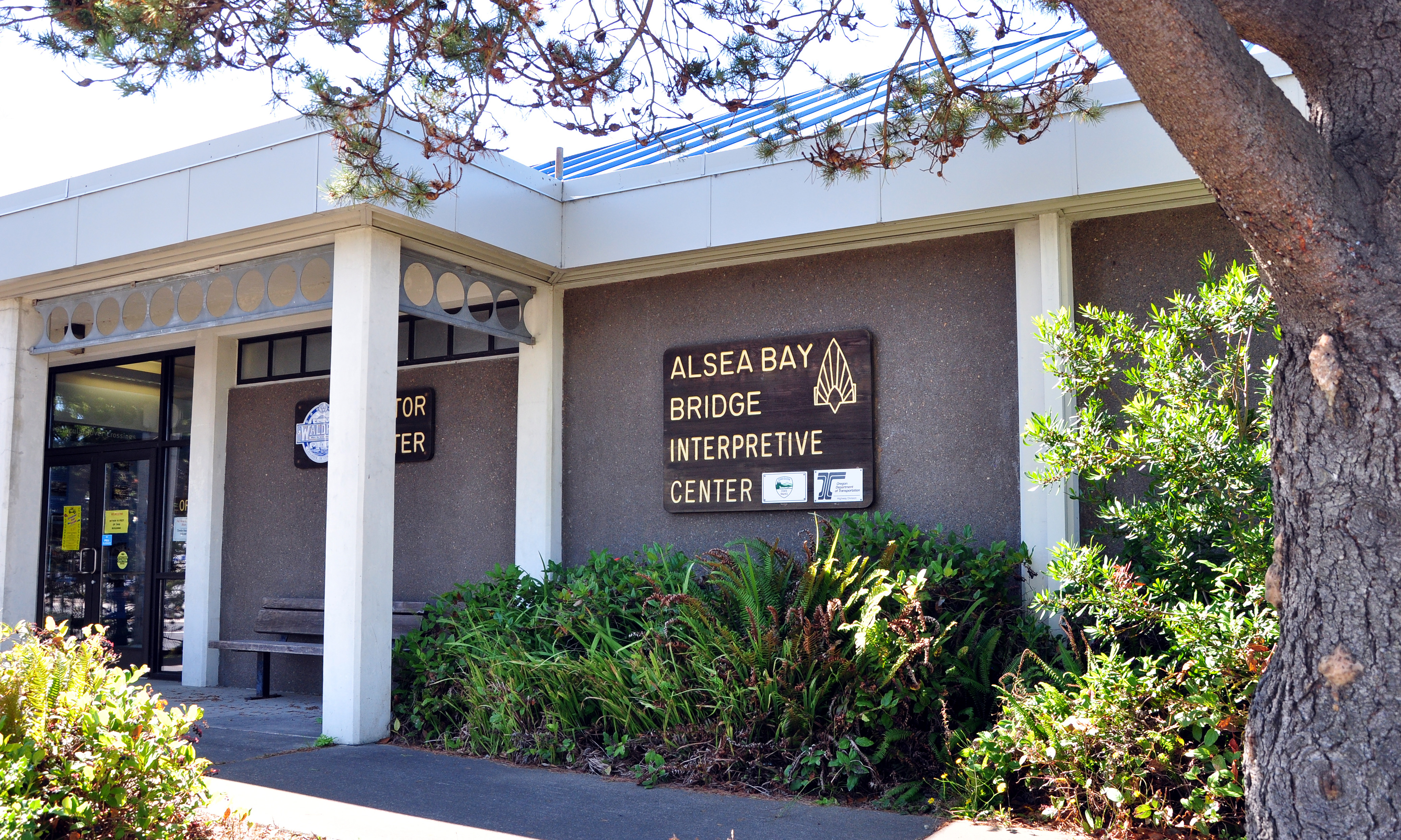
- Alsea Bay Bridge Interpretive Center in Waldport
- Motto: Where the Forest Meets the Sea
- Location in Oregon
- Coordinates: 44°25′02″N 124°03′59″W
- Country: United States
- State: Oregon
- County: Lincoln
- Incorporated: 1911

Area
  - Total: 2.94 sq mi (7.62 km^{2})
  - Land: 2.71 sq mi (7.03 km^{2})
  - Water: 0.23 sq mi (0.59 km^{2})
- Elevation: 157 ft (48 m)

Population (2020)
  - Total: 2,249
  - Density: 828.3/sq mi (319.82/km^{2})
- Time zone: UTC−08:00 (Pacific)
  - Summer (DST): UTC−07:00 (Pacific)
- ZIP Code: 97394
- Area code: 541
- FIPS code: 41-78000
- GNIS feature ID: 2412167
- Website: http://www.waldportoregon.gov

Waldport is a city in Lincoln County, Oregon, United States. The population was 2,033 at the 2010 census. The city is located on the Alsea River and Alsea Bay, 15 miles (24 km) south of Newport and 8 miles (13 km) north of Yachats.

== History ==
=== Indigenous history ===
Before white settlement, the Waldport area was home to the Alsi (Alsea) people, whose name for the bay and river, Alsi, meaning "peace", gave the waterway its name. During winter, extended families lived in large plank houses around the lower Alsea estuary, traveling seasonally between Seal Rock and Tenmile to fish, hunt, and gather shellfish and plants. The Alsea were part of the broader Yakonan-speaking language group along with the Yaquina, Yachats, Siuslaw, and Lower Umpqua peoples.

Following Franklin Pierce's 1855 executive order establishing the Coast Indian Reservation, Joel Palmer, Oregon's Superintendent of Indian Affairs, created the Alsea Subagency on Alsea Bay in September 1856 to administer tribes between Coos Bay and the Alsea River; the subagency, built by Indian laborers, operated until 1875. In 1861, the U.S. Army forcibly relocated the Alsea, Siuslaw, and a small band of Lower Umpqua people to the subagency, and Congress subdivided the Coast Reservation in 1865, creating a separate Alsea Reservation before eliminating it entirely a decade later, opening the area to non-Native settlement. Descendants of these tribes are today represented by the Confederated Tribes of Siletz Indians.

=== Settlement and founding (1879–1911) ===
Non-Native settlement began in 1879 when David Ruble purchased squatter's rights from Lint Starr for $300, covering land that includes present-day "Old Town." Early arrivals reached the coast by floating supplies and building materials down the Alsea River by canoe, and salmon fishing quickly became central to the young settlement's economy. Many early settlers were of German descent, inspiring the town's name, wald (forest) plus port, reflecting its coastal location. David and Orlena Ruble platted the townsite in 1884 after receiving a federal land patent, and the plat was formally recorded on September 9, 1885. By the time Waldport incorporated in 1911, it had a dozen businesses and roughly 150 residents.

In 1910, the Port of Alsea district was formed, encompassing Waldport, Yachats, and Tidewater; it continues to hold much of the Alsea estuary in public trust and manage boating and fishing access on the bay.

=== Timber, fishing, and the coming of the highway ===
For its first several decades, Waldport's economy centered on salmon canneries, sawmills, dairying, and logging, with forest products remaining central to the local economy for a century. The town's isolation eased considerably in the 1930s with the construction of U.S. Route 101 (the Oregon Coast Highway) and its associated bridges. The 3,011-foot Alsea Bay Bridge, funded by the federal Public Works Administration, took three years to build and opened to traffic in 1936; it was one of five PWA-funded coastal bridges (also spanning Coos Bay, the Siuslaw River, the Umpqua River, and Yaquina Bay) that completed the Oregon Coast Highway, all designed by state bridge engineer Conde McCullough in his signature Art Deco style. Coastal tourism in Oregon jumped by more than two-thirds the year after the five bridges were finished, transforming Waldport's economy. Corrosion from the marine environment eventually forced the bridge's replacement; a new span, designed by HNTB, was built between 1988 and 1991, and the original McCullough bridge was subsequently demolished. The Alsea Bay Bridge Historic Interpretive Center, built on the Waldport side in 1991, now houses a replica of McCullough's office and exhibits on the coast highway's bridges.

=== World War I and the spruce boom (1917–1919) ===
Before Camp Angel's arrival, Waldport had already hosted a wartime military logging effort. In 1917, the U.S. Army created the Spruce Production Division to supply aircraft-grade Sitka spruce for the war effort after a labor strike led by the Industrial Workers of the World threatened the region's lumber supply. Over 3,370 soldiers were assigned to the division's Yaquina District, which included operations around Waldport, and in the summer of 1918 division soldiers built roads and rail lines to transport spruce logs to sawmills. Soldiers working with the Warren Spruce Company, organized in February 1918 to handle logging in the area, built a rail line and at least one bridge over a mile long to haul logs out of the heavily timbered Blodgett Tract between Waldport and Yachats, letting loggers transport whole logs by rail rather than wastefully splitting them by hand. When the war ended on November 11, 1918, construction of the spruce railroads halted immediately, and much of the division's equipment was later auctioned off cheaply— a windfall that gave established lumber companies a head start on postwar coastal logging using the newly built railroads and bridges. The rail line born of this wartime effort went on to serve Waldport-area logging operations into the 1930s.

=== Camp Angel and the Fine Arts Group (1942–1945) ===
Camp Waldport, or Civilian Public Service Camp No. 56 was one of three conscientious objector camps in Oregon during World War II, established in 1942 and administered by the Mennonite Central Committee, home to the camp's Fine Arts Group. Internees' primary work was reforesting the Blodgett Peak Burn, land that had been heavily logged and later devastated by wildfire; workers replanted roughly 9,000 acres of burned Blodgett-tract forest, laboring 8 ½-hour days, six days a week, planting seedlings at eight-foot intervals even through 100 inches of winter rain. The work was dangerous. Five men died at the camp over its three years of operation, out of nineteen deaths across the entire CPS camp system, and Waldport was the only camp in the system located within the wartime coastal blackout zone.

In their off hours, camp members built a small but influential arts community. Camp internees included several poets and artists later linked to the Beat Generation and San Francisco Renaissance, among them Kemper Nomland, William Eshelman, Kermit Sheets, painter Morris Graves, and poets William Everson, Glen Coffield, George Woodcock, and Kenneth Patchen, along with poet William Stafford, who was interned there from 1942 to 1946. In 1943, Everson, Nomland, Sheets, and Eshelman co-founded the camp's in-house press, Untide Press, which published poetry volumes by Coffield, Everson, Patchen, and others in an inexpensive, accessible format. Camp Angel's Fine Arts Program, unique within the CPS system, staged original plays and produced hand-printed books throughout its operation, work later credited with helping seed the countercultural arts scenes of the following two decades.

=== Postwar growth and the 1964 tsunami ===
Waldport's economy boomed alongside the rest of the Oregon coast's timber industry after 1945, as sawmills expanded to meet heavy demand from California's construction market through the 1950s and 1960s. Fishing and dairying remained active alongside logging, and the community continued to rely on salmon canneries and small sawmills through the mid-20th century. Waldport High School opened in 1958, serving the growing district.

On the evening of March 27, 1964, a magnitude 9.2 earthquake off the coast of Alaska— the most powerful ever recorded in North America— sent a tsunami surging into the Oregon coast several hours later. In Waldport, the water in Alsea Bay first drained out dramatically before a series of surges over roughly twelve hours tore loose docks and boats and left capsized hulls scattered in the bay. Logs, mud, and debris driven inland blocked sections of Highway 101 near Waldport, requiring bulldozers to clear the roadway, and at least two motels near the water were flooded. The area between Waldport and Yachats suffered some of the worst damage on the central Oregon coast; statewide, the tsunami killed four children near Newport, among the few tsunami-related deaths recorded in Oregon history.

By the 1970s and into the 1980s, mechanization, corporate consolidation, and shrinking timber inventories brought a slow contraction to the coastal logging industry that had sustained Waldport for a century, a decline that accelerated with mill closures across the Oregon coast beginning in the late 1970s.

=== Heaven's Gate lecture (1975) ===
On September 14, 1975, Marshall Applewhite and Bonnie Nettles, using the names "Bo" and "Peep", gave a public UFO lecture in Waldport, then a town of under 1,000 residents. Roughly 200 people attended the meeting at the Bayshore Inn, advertised by flyers reading "UFOs—Why they are here," and Applewhite and Nettles told the room that a spaceship would soon arrive to carry believers to a "next evolutionary level." Shortly afterward, roughly 20 Waldport-area residents left with the pair, most first traveling to a gathering in Grand Junction, Colorado; accounts of the exact number vary between 20 and 23 in contemporary and later reporting. The group would later become known as Heaven's Gate; the episode ended in the mass suicide of 39 cult members in Rancho Santa Fe, California, on March 26, 1997, timed to the closest approach of Comet Hale–Bopp. In September 2025, on the 50th anniversary of the Waldport lecture, three early followers who survived the group returned to Waldport's Alsi Resort, the same building, under a different name, where the original 1975 meeting was held, to publicly share their accounts for the first time.

=== Late 20th and early 21st-century Waldport ===
As timber employment declined through the 1980s and 1990s, tourism and retirement migration increasingly shaped Waldport's economy and population. The city's population grew nearly 25 percent during the 1990s, and by the 2010s roughly a third of residents were 65 or older, reflecting a broader shift toward retirees drawn by the coast's scenery and slower pace of life. In 1988, construction began on a replacement for the aging, corrosion-damaged 1936 Alsea Bay Bridge; the new span opened in 1991, and the original McCullough-designed bridge was subsequently demolished, with the Historic Alsea Bay Bridge Interpretive Center opening that same year to preserve its memory. In 2010, Waldport became home to a west campus of Oregon Coast Community College. On March 11, 2011, a tsunami generated by the Tōhoku earthquake in Japan again struck the Oregon coast, though with less severe local impact than in 1964. Today, tourism, small business, and education anchor Waldport's economy, with commercial fishing through the nearby Newport port group remaining a significant regional industry even as the sawmills and canneries that once defined the town have largely disappeared.

== Geography ==
According to the United States Census Bureau, the city has a total area of 3.02 square miles (7.82 km^{2}), of which 2.77 square miles (7.17 km^{2}) is land and 0.25 square miles (0.65 km^{2}) is water.

=== Climate ===
This region experiences warm (but not hot) and semi-dry summers with some rainy days, with no average monthly temperatures above 70.4 °F (21.3 °C). According to the Köppen Climate Classification system, Waldport has a warm-summer Mediterranean climate, abbreviated Csb on climate maps. Waldport's Köppen classification and climate is similar to locations such as parts of Ireland, the southern UK, northwest Washington state around Olympic National Park and Canada's British Columbia.

There are cool winters during which intense rainfall occurs. It has warm, dry summers with partly overcast and moderate rainfall through the summer months.

Snow in Waldport is rare but possible in winter months.

Average December temperatures are a maximum of 53.0 °F (11.7 °C) and a minimum of 39.0 °F (3.9 °C). Average August temperatures are a maximum of 70.4 °F (21.3 °C) and a minimum of 61.5 °F (16.4 °C). The record high temperature was 108 °F (42 °C). The record low temperature was −12 °F (−24 °C).

Average annual precipitation is 78.4 inches (1,990 mm). There are on average 165 days with measurable precipitation, which makes Waldport a temperate rainforest.

Climate data for Waldport, Oregon
Month	Jan	Feb	Mar	Apr	May	Jun	Jul	Aug	Sep	Oct	Nov	Dec	Year
Mean daily maximum °F (°C)	52.4 (11.3)	54.6 (12.6)	56.8 (13.8)	59.2 (15.1)	62.5 (16.9)	65.8 (18.8)	68.9 (20.5)	70.4 (21.3)	69.4 (20.8)	63.9 (17.7)	56.1 (13.4)	51.3 (10.7)	60.9 (16.1)
Daily mean °F (°C)	46.0 (7.8)	47.1 (8.4)	48.8 (9.3)	50.7 (10.4)	54.3 (12.4)	57.9 (14.4)	60.6 (15.9)	61.5 (16.4)	59.6 (15.3)	56.9 (13.8)	49.3 (9.6)	40.1 (4.5)	52.7 (11.5)
Mean daily minimum °F (°C)	39.6 (4.2)	39.5 (4.2)	40.8 (4.9)	42.2 (5.7)	46.1 (7.8)	49.9 (9.9)	52.2 (11.2)	52.6 (11.4)	49.8 (9.9)	49.8 (9.9)	42.5 (5.8)	38.8 (3.8)	45.3 (7.4)
Average precipitation inches (mm)	12.8 (330)	8.4 (210)	9.1 (230)	6.0 (150)	3.8 (97)	3.0 (76)	0.9 (23)	0.9 (23)	2.1 (53)	5.7 (140)	12.4 (310)	13.3 (340)	78.4 (1,982)
Average snowfall inches (cm)	0.7 (1.8)	0.2 (0.51)	0 (0)	0 (0)	0 (0)	0 (0)	0 (0)	0 (0)	0 (0)	0 (0)	0 (0)	0.1 (0.25)	1 (2.56)
Average precipitation days	20	17	19	16	13	10	5	4	7	13	21	20	165
Average snowy days	2	1	0	0	0	0	0	0	0	0	0	1	4
Average relative humidity (%)	85.0	82.5	77.5	72.5	69.0	65.0	58.0	60.5	66.0	77.0	86.0	88.0	73.9
Average dew point °F (°C)	36.0 (2.2)	38.0 (3.3)	39.0 (3.9)	41.0 (5.0)	46.0 (7.8)	50.0 (10.0)	53.0 (11.7)	52.0 (11.1)	49.0 (9.4)	46.0 (7.8)	42.0 (5.6)	37.0 (2.8)	44.1 (6.7)
Mean monthly sunshine hours	130.3	105.85	171.9	225.6	261.5	293.65	338.95	325.75	268.7	165.33	138.0	129.15	2,554.68
Mean daily sunshine hours	4.2	3.8	5.6	7.5	8.4	9.8	10.9	10.6	9.0	6.7	5.3	4.5	7.2
Average ultraviolet index	2	2	3	3	4	4	5	4	4	3	2	2	3
Source 1: SUN, UV INDEX under worldweatheronline
Source 2: EXTREMES, humidity, dew point under myforecast.co

== Demographics ==
Historical population
Census	Pop.	Note	%±
1920	181		—
1930	367		102.8%
1940	630		71.7%
1950	689		9.4%
1960	667		−3.2%
1970	700		4.9%
1980	1,274		82.0%
1990	1,595		25.2%
2000	2,050		28.5%
2010	2,033		−0.8%
2020	2,249		10.6%
U.S. Decennial Census

=== 2020 census ===
As of the 2020 census, Waldport had a population of 2,249. The median age was 58.0 years. 14.8% of residents were under the age of 18 and 35.3% of residents were 65 years of age or older. For every 100 females there were 90.4 males, and for every 100 females age 18 and over there were 87.2 males age 18 and over.

86.6% of residents lived in urban areas, while 13.4% lived in rural areas.

There were 1,115 households in Waldport, of which 17.0% had children under the age of 18 living in them. Of all households, 42.1% were married-couple households, 19.3% were households with a male householder and no spouse or partner present, and 31.0% were households with a female householder and no spouse or partner present. About 37.0% of all households were made up of individuals and 22.1% had someone living alone who was 65 years of age or older.

There were 1,324 housing units, of which 15.8% were vacant. Among occupied housing units, 66.7% were owner-occupied and 33.3% were renter-occupied. The homeowner vacancy rate was 1.8% and the rental vacancy rate was 4.6%.

Racial composition as of the 2020 census
Race	Number	Percent
White	1,888	83.9%
Black or African American	10	0.4%
American Indian and Alaska Native	29	1.3%
Asian	22	1.0%
Native Hawaiian and Other Pacific Islander	4	0.2%
Some other race	32	1.4%
Two or more races	264	11.7%
Hispanic or Latino (of any race)	131	5.8%

=== 2010 census ===
As of the census of 2010, there were 2,033 people, 974 households, and 530 families living in the city. The population density was 733.9 inhabitants per square mile (283.4/km^{2}). There were 1,196 housing units at an average density of 431.8 per square mile (166.7/km^{2}). The racial makeup of the city was 91.2% White, 0.8% African American, 1.1% Native American, 1.0% Asian, 0.3% Pacific Islander, 0.5% from other races, and 5.1% from two or more races. Hispanic or Latino of any race were 3.3% of the population.

There were 974 households, of which 19.3% had children under the age of 18 living with them, 42.2% were married couples living together, 7.9% had a female householder with no husband present, 4.3% had a male householder with no wife present, and 45.6% were non-families. 37.4% of all households were made up of individuals, and 17.6% had someone living alone who was 65 years of age or older. The average household size was 2.08 and the average family size was 2.69.

The median age in the city was 53 years. 15.8% of residents were under the age of 18; 5% were between the ages of 18 and 24; 16.1% were from 25 to 44; 36.9% were from 45 to 64; and 26.2% were 65 years of age or older. The gender makeup of the city was 47.4% male and 52.6% female.

=== 2000 census ===
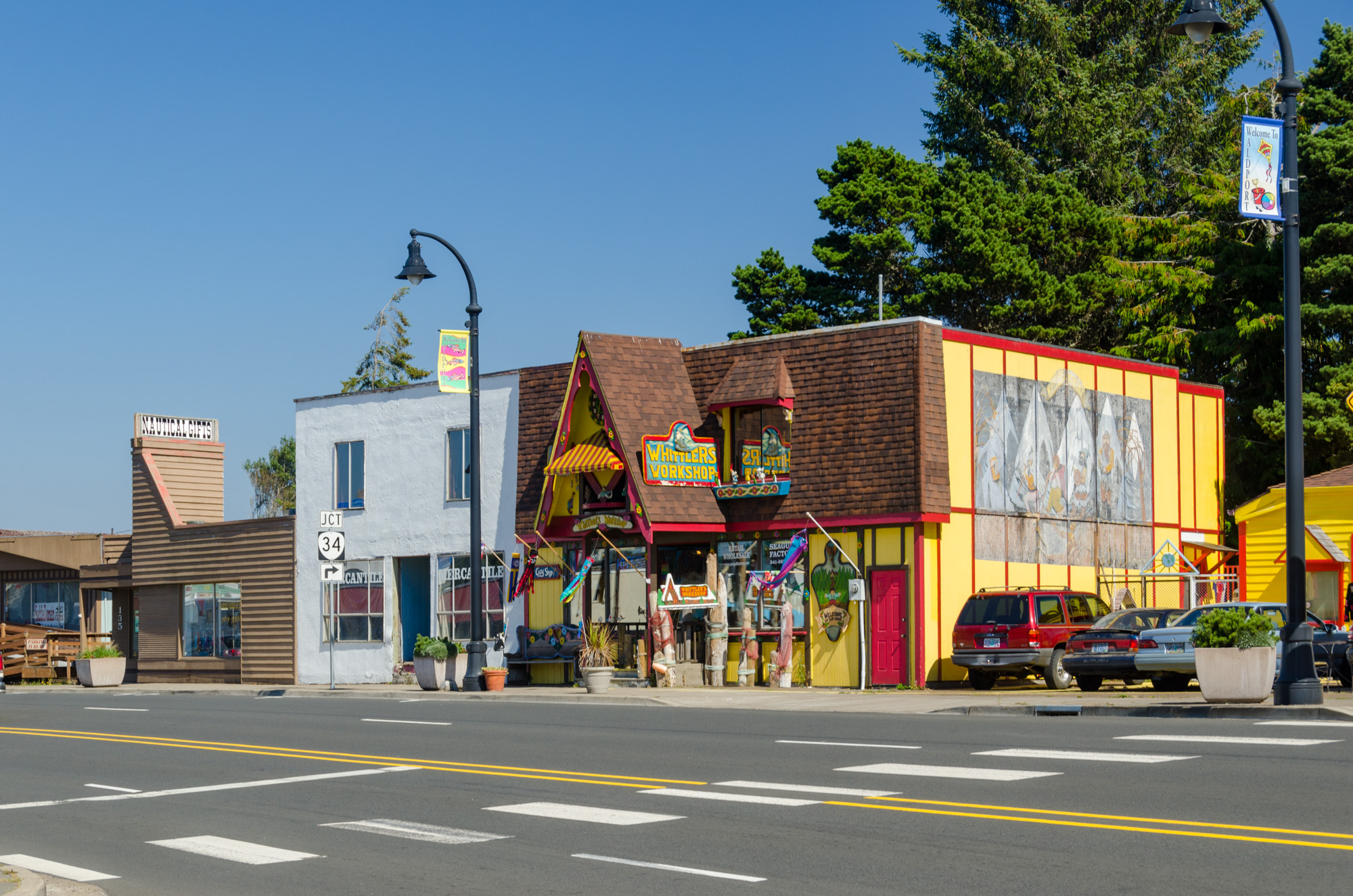
Downtown Waldport

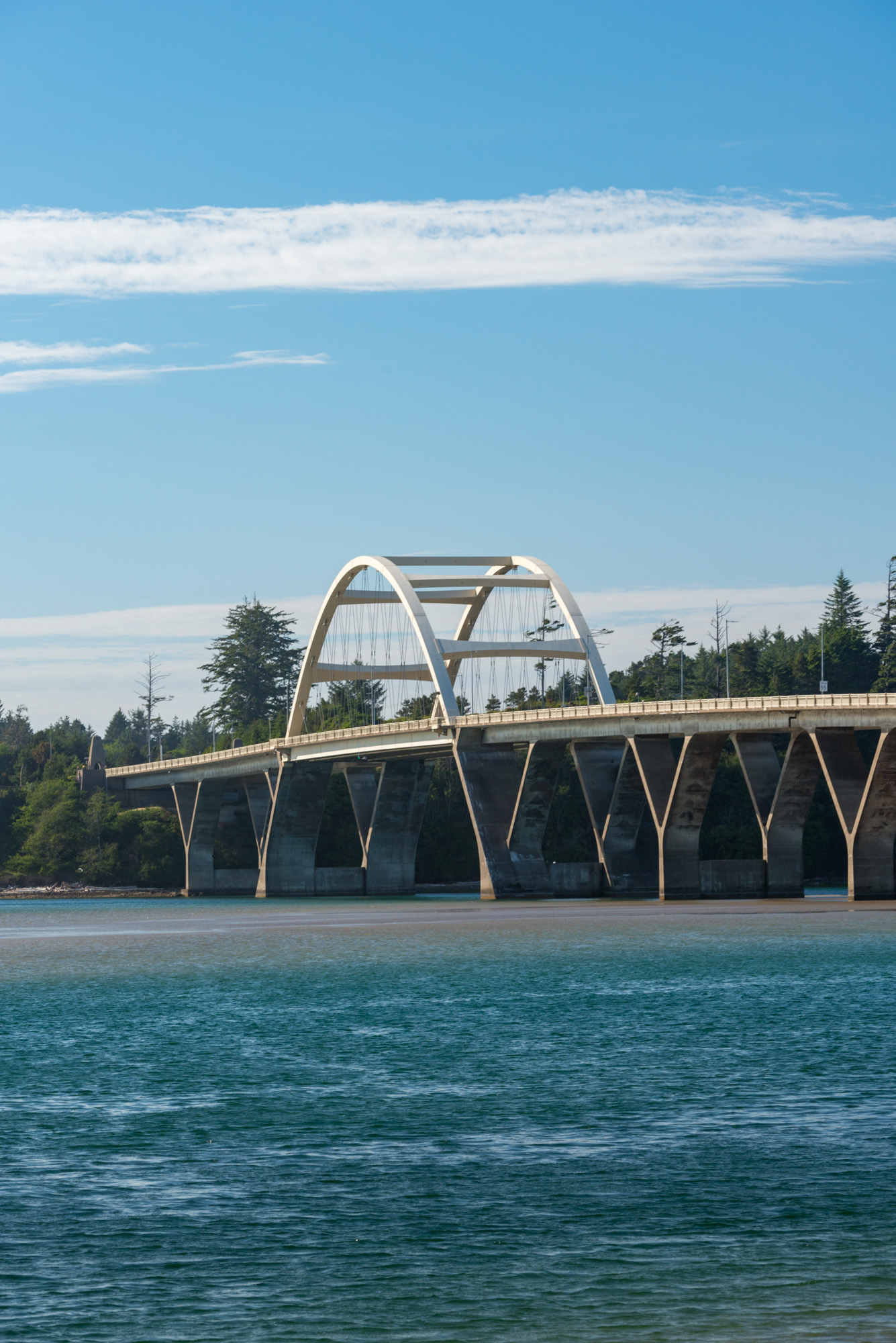
Alsea Bay Bridge at Waldport

As of the census of 2000, there were 2,050 people, 909 households, and 540 families living in the city. The population density was 956.8 inhabitants per square mile (369.4/km^{2}). There were 1,099 housing units at an average density of 513.0 per square mile (198.1/km^{2}). The racial makeup of the city was 93.41% White, 0.10% African American, 2.20% Native American, 1.17% Asian, 0.10% Pacific Islander, 0.34% from other races, and 2.68% from two or more races. Hispanic or Latino of any race were 3.71% of the population.

There were 909 households, out of which 23.8% had children under the age of 18 living with them, 44.2% were married couples living together, 12.2% had a female householder with no husband present, and 40.5% were non-families. 34.0% of all households were made up of individuals, and 17.2% had someone living alone who was 65 years of age or older. The average household size was 2.24 and the average family size was 2.81.

In the city, the population was spread out, with 23.9% under the age of 18, 4.2% from 18 to 24, 22.8% from 25 to 44, 25.7% from 45 to 64, and 23.5% who were 65 years of age or older. The median age was 45 years. For every 100 females, there were 83.0 males. For every 100 females age 18 and over, there were 78.3 males.

The median income for a household in the city was $33,301, and the median income for a family was $38,571. Males had a median income of $29,904 versus $22,071 for females. The per capita income for the city was $15,939. About 9.4% of families and 17.3% of the population were below the poverty line, including 24.9% of those under age 18 and 9.6% of those age 65 or over.

== Government ==
On February 22, 2009, Mayor Herman Welch announced that he was leaving the Republican Party. Upon re-registering as a member of the Independent Party of Oregon, he became the first public official in Oregon to be a member of that party.

On April 3, 2025, the Waldport City Council unanimously voted to expel mayor Heide Lambert, citing a violation of a section of the city charter which states no member of the council shall directly or indirectly attempt to direct a city officer or employee in the performance of their duties. On April 10, Lambert arrived at a scheduled council meeting along with a contingent of supporters and attempted to assume her seat, but was escorted from the meeting and cited for disorderly conduct, although charges were later dropped. On May 8, Lincoln County's presiding judge ruled that the city council had to reinstate Lambert as mayor until there is time to decide whether her removal the previous month was legal. Following this, on May 27, the city council unanimously voted to reinstate Lambert, citing legal expenses and a desire to move on.

== Education ==
Waldport High School is a public high school in Waldport that opened in 1958. The school is part of the Lincoln County School District.

In 2010, the west campus of Oregon Coast Community College opened in Waldport.

== Infrastructure ==
- Alsea Bay Bridge
- Wakonda Beach State Airport
- U.S. Route 101
- Oregon Route 34
