= Alsea Bay Bridge =

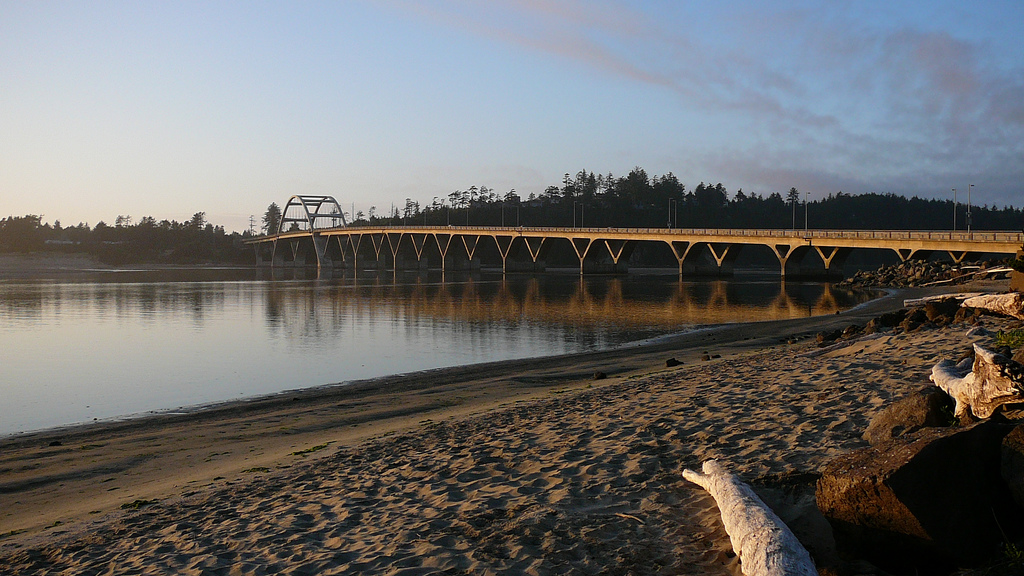
- The 1991 Alsea Bay Bridge
- Coordinates: 44.4319°N 124.0705°W
- Carries: US 101
- Crosses: Alsea Bay
- Locale: near Waldport, Oregon

Characteristics
- Design: concrete arch bridge (both)
- Total length: 3,011 feet (918 m) (1st); 2,910 feet (890 m) (2nd)
- Longest span: 450 feet (140 m)
- Clearance below: 70 feet (21 m) (2nd)

History
- Construction start: 1988
- Opened: 1936 (1st); 1991 (2nd)
- Closed: 1989 (1st)

Location
- Interactive map of Alsea Bay Bridge

The Alsea Bay Bridge is a concrete arch bridge that spans the Alsea Bay on U.S. Route 101 (US 101) near Waldport, Oregon.

== History ==
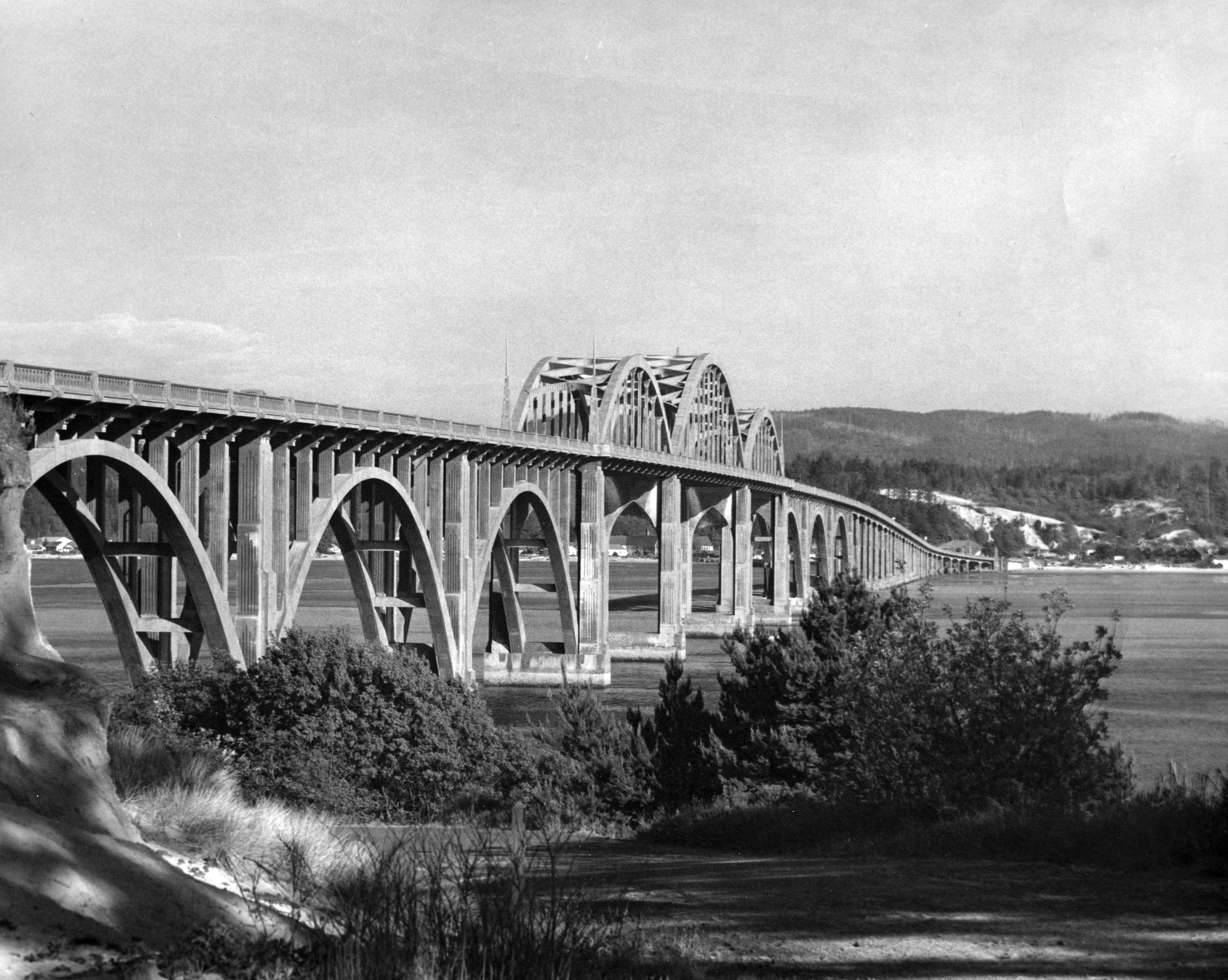
Original Alsea Bay Bridge

There have been two bridges on this site.

The first bridge was designed by Conde McCullough and opened in 1936. It was a 3,011-foot-long (918 m) reinforced-concrete combination deck and through arch bridge.

The hostile environment caused significant corrosion to the steel reinforcements. In 1972 the Oregon Department of Transportation began projects aimed at extending the life of the bridge. By the mid-1980s it was decided to replace the bridge rather than continue costly rehabilitation efforts. The first bridge was demolished in 1991. Construction of the second bridge, designed by HNTB, began in 1988, and it was opened in the fall of 1991 at a cost of $42.4 million. The bridge is 2,910 ft (890 m) in total length, with a 450 ft (140 m) main span that provides 70 ft (21 m) of vertical clearance. The bridge has a latex concrete deck and the piers are significantly thicker than normal in an attempt to thwart corrosion. Its life expectancy is 75 to 100 years.

== See also ==
- List of bridges documented by the Historic American Engineering Record in Oregon
- List of bridges on U.S. Route 101 in Oregon
