= Alsea Bay =

Coordinates: 44.4377°N 124.0501°W

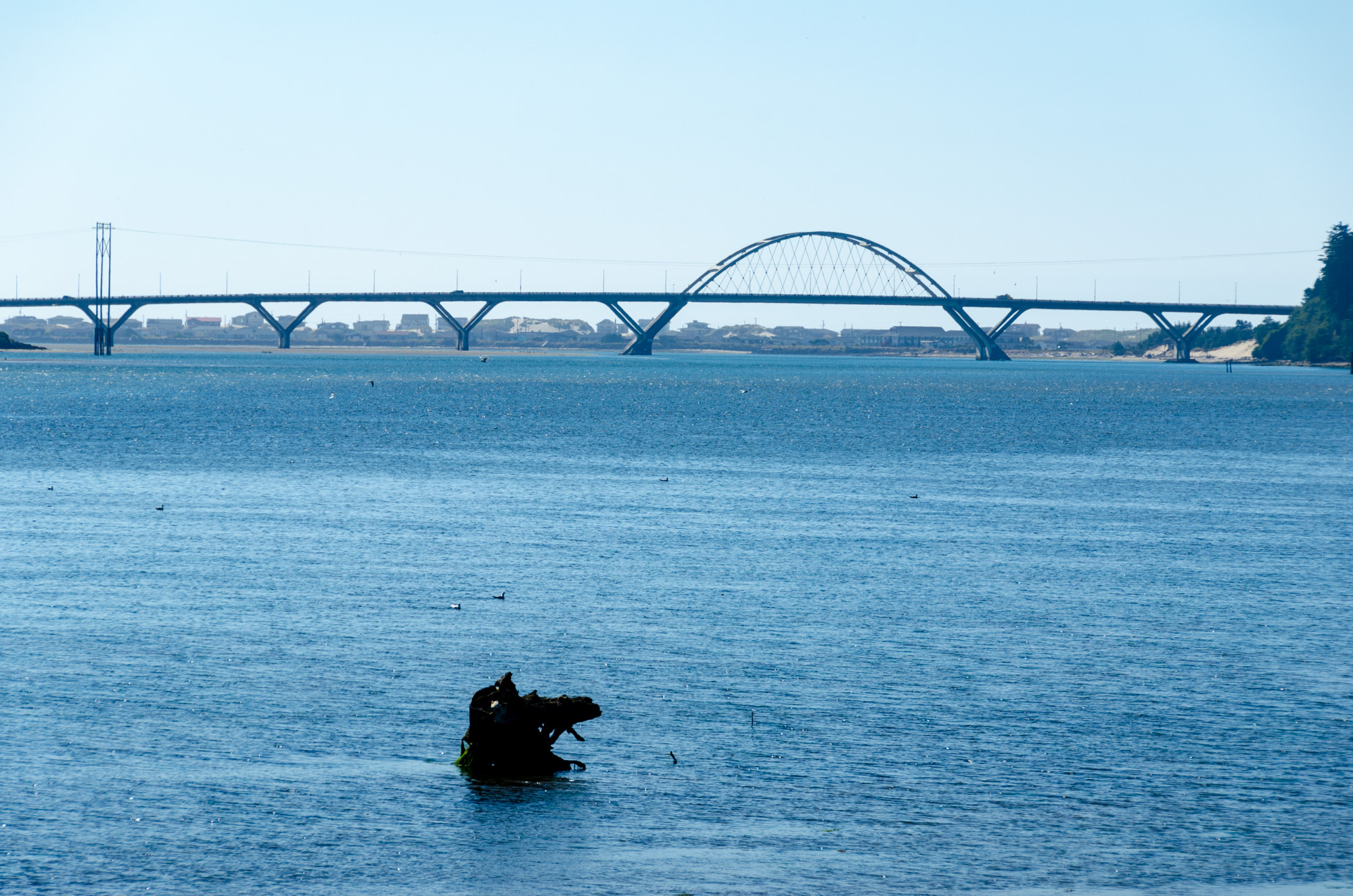
Alsea Bay Bridge from Bayview Road. Lincoln County.

Alsea Bay is a body of water near Waldport, Oregon at the mouth of the Alsea River. It is a site for beach angling. It is spanned by the Alsea Bay Bridge and is in Lincoln County, Oregon.
