= Yachats State Recreation Area =

State park located in Lincoln County, Oregon

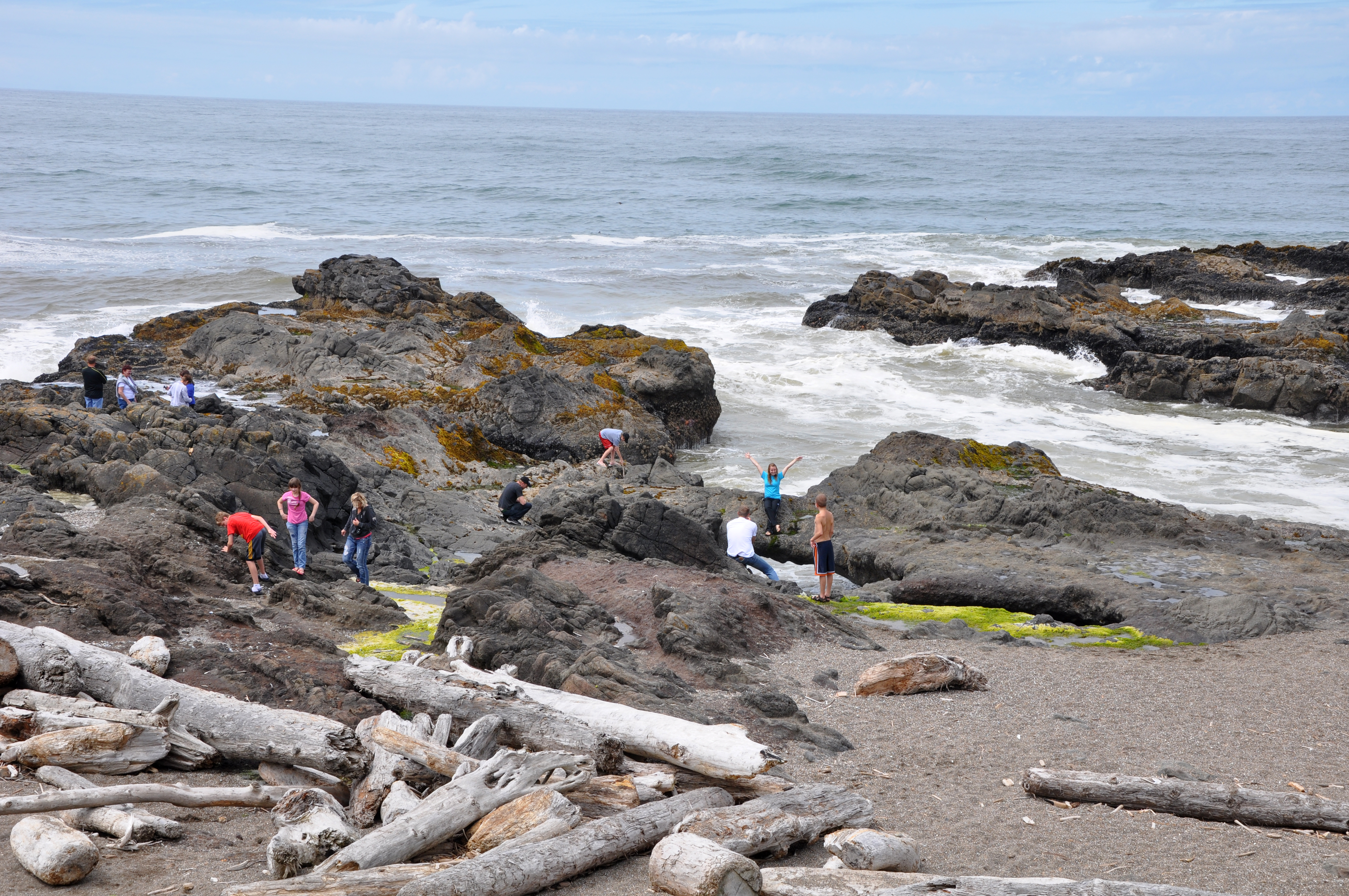
- Visitors play on the park's seaside rocks

- Location within Oregon Location within the United States
- Type: Public, state
- Location: Lincoln County, Oregon, United States
- Nearest city: Yachats
- Coordinates: 44°18′40″N 124°06′31″W
- Operator: Oregon Parks and Recreation Department

The Yachats State Recreation Area is a state park in southern Lincoln County, Oregon, in the central district of the town of Yachats. It is administered by the Oregon Parks and Recreation Department. It is located on the Pacific Ocean coast, on the north side of the mouth of the Yachats River. The park is open for day use only, and offers wildlife and surf viewing, tidepools, fishing, and picnicking.

== Gallery ==
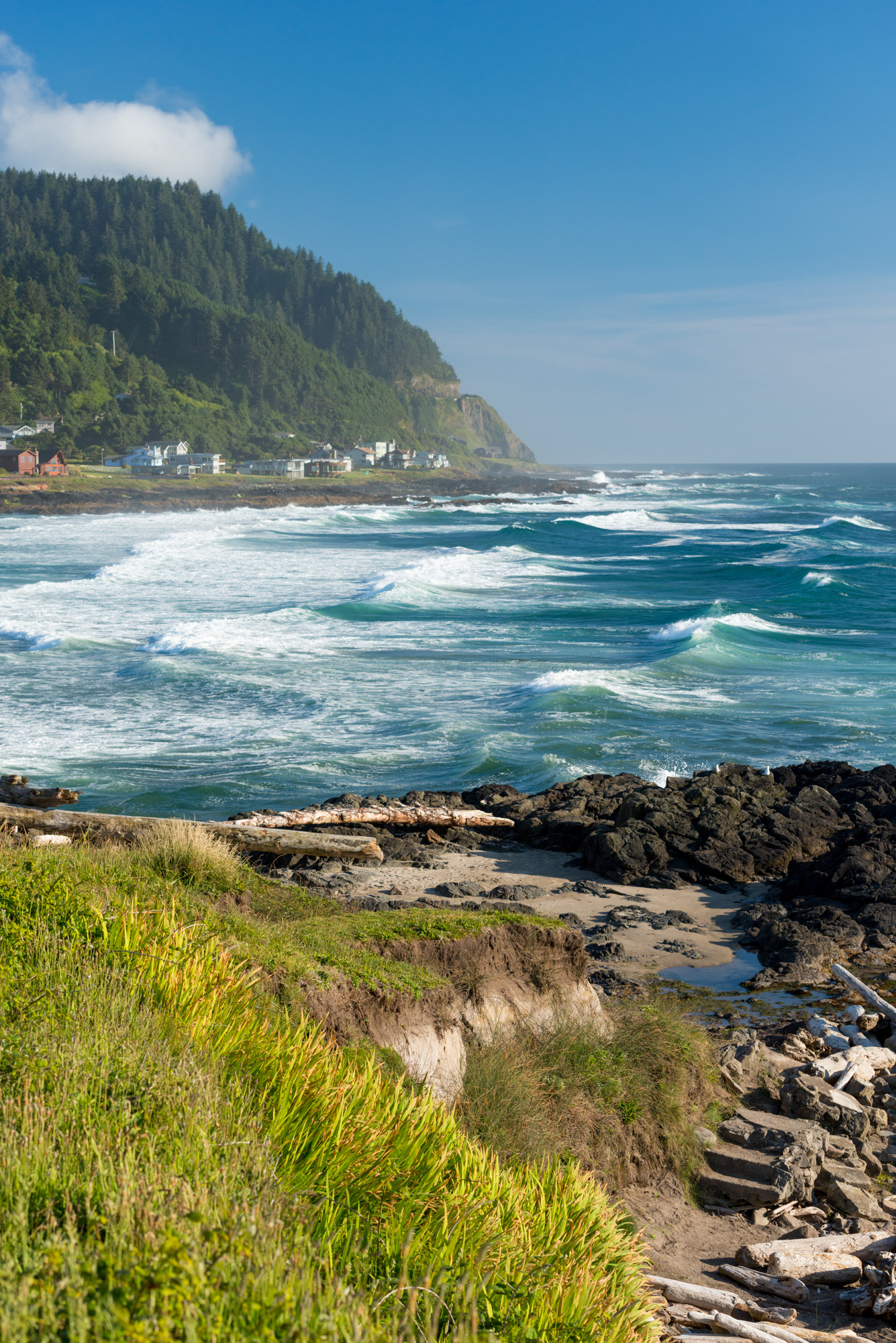
Yachats SRA, looking south towards Cape Perpetua.

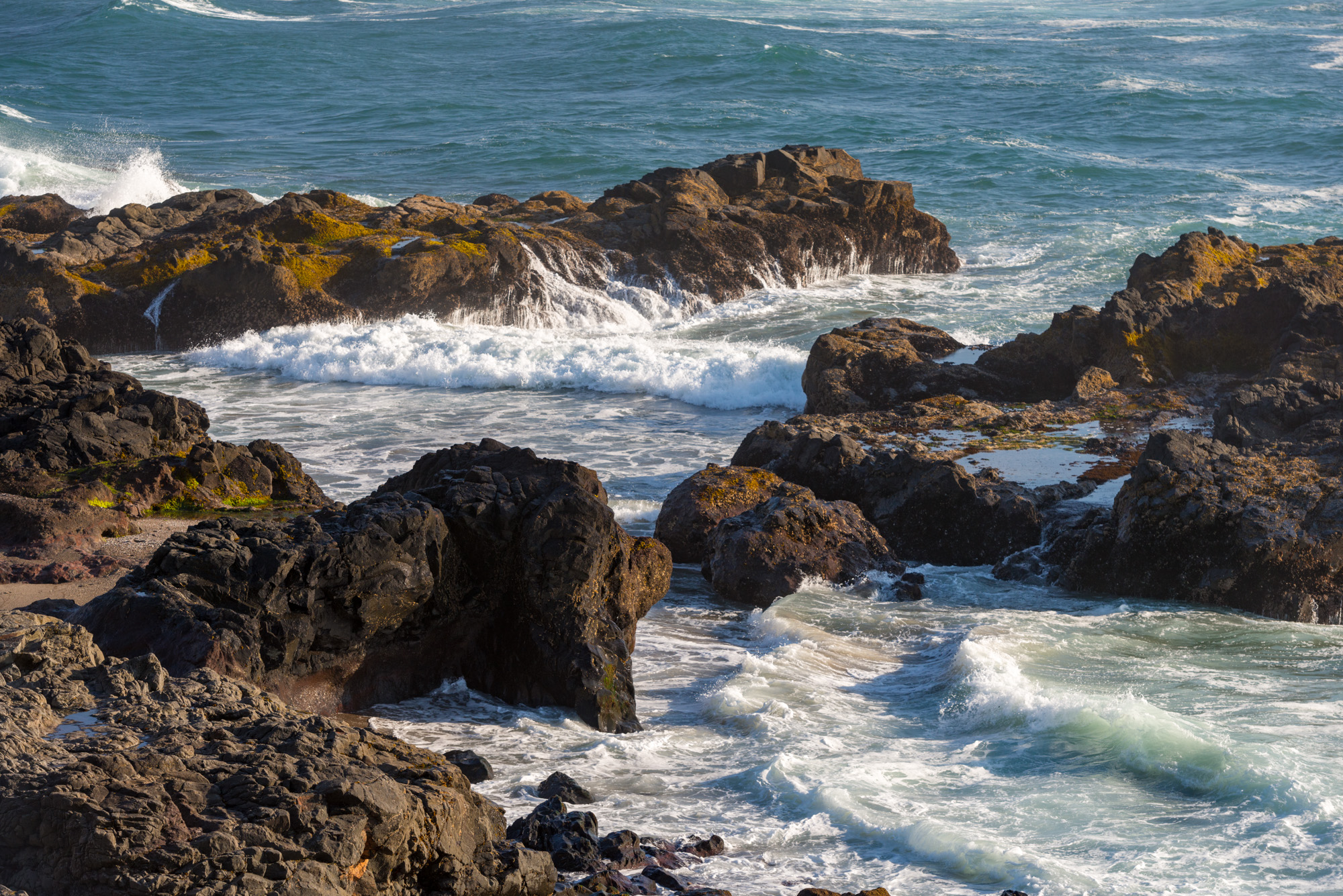
Rocky shoreline at Yachats SRA.

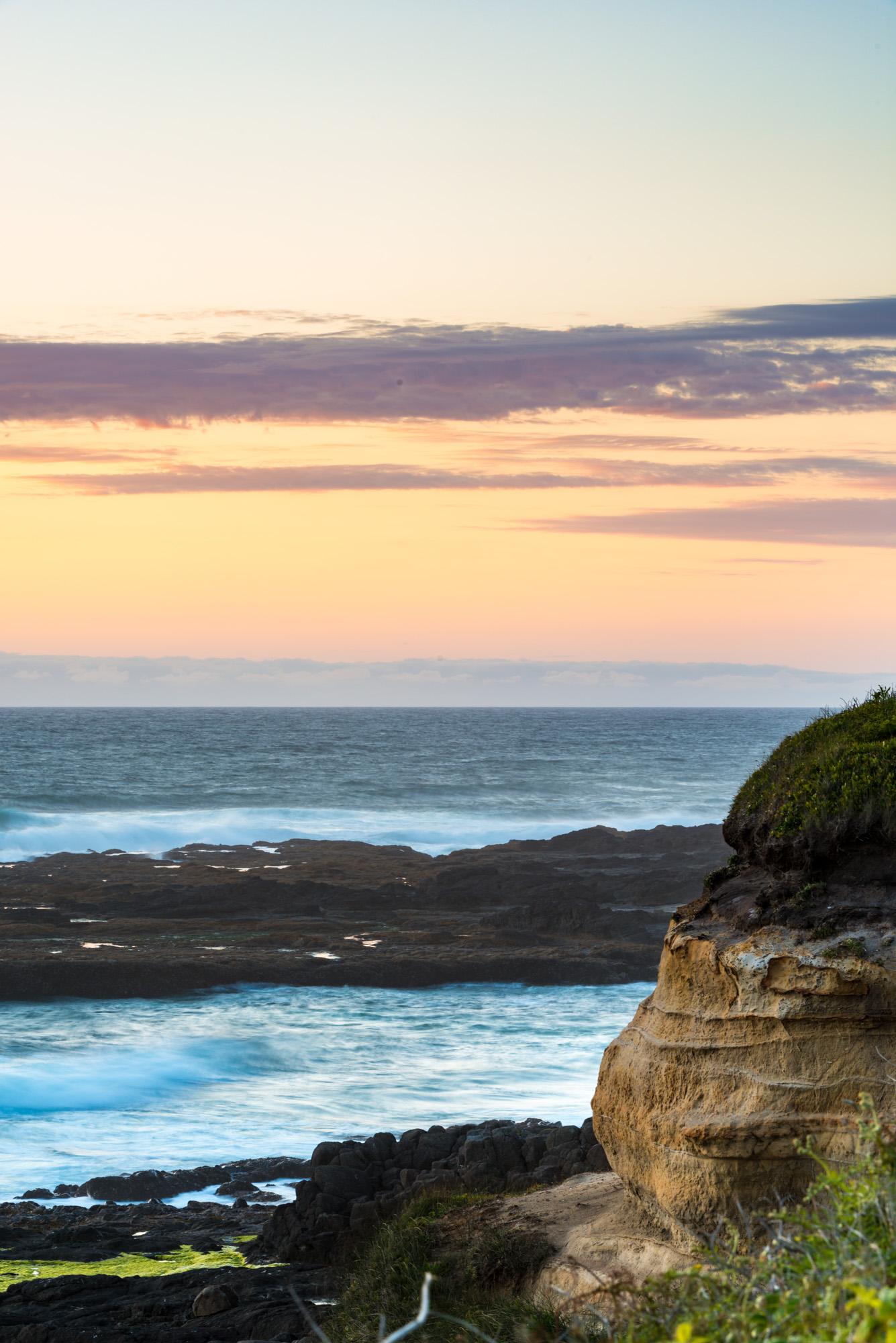
Bluff at Yachats SRA.

== See also ==
- List of Oregon State Parks
- Yachats Ocean Road State Natural Site
