= Cleft of the Rock Light =

Lighthouse in Oregon, United States

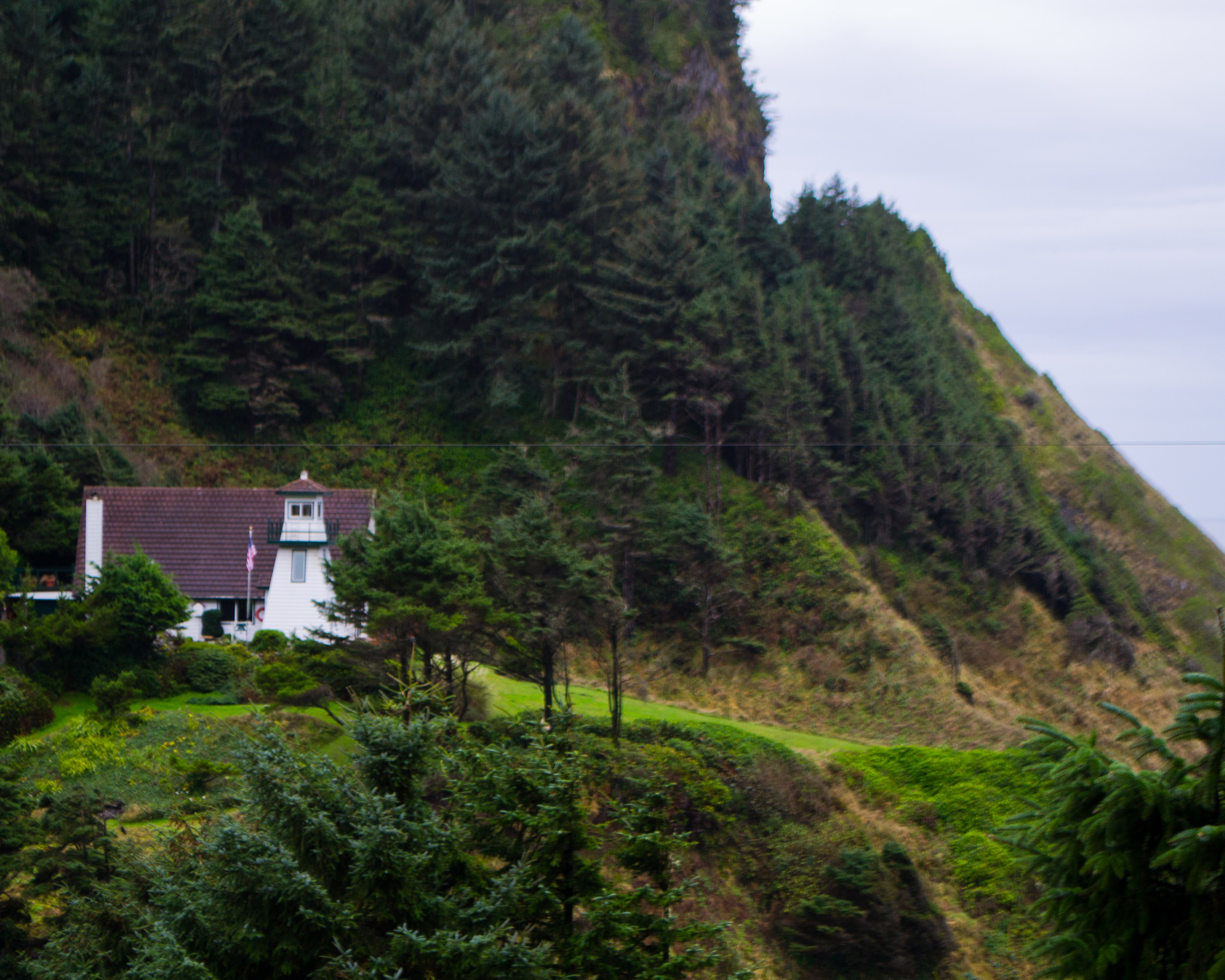
- Location: Cape Perpetua, Oregon, U.S.
- Coordinates: 44.290479°N 124.110773°W

Tower
- Construction: lumber
- Height: 34-foot-tall (10 m) on 110-foot-high (34 m) ground

Light
- First lit: 1976
- Focal height: 34 m (112 ft)
- Lens: two Fourth order Fresnel lenses
- Range: 16 miles (26 km)
- Characteristic: Alt WR 10s

Cleft of the Rock Light is a privately owned lighthouse located on the Pacific coast of the U.S. state of Oregon, 1.8 miles (2.9 km) south of Yachats on Cape Perpetua.

It was built, in 1976, by former Tillamook Rock Light attendant and lighthouse historian James A. Gibbs who was active in preserving the lantern room of Smith Island Light. Cleft of the Rock Light is designed after Fiddle Reef Light, which operated from 1898 to 1958 in Oak Bay, British Columbia, a suburb of Victoria, British Columbia, Canada. The Cleft's tower contains a stair railing from the original keeper's dwelling at Yaquina Head Light. Other historic items include a stopwatch from Desdemona Sands Light, two brass oil cans from Tillamook Rock Light and Heceta Head Light, and a crank handle which wound the weights at Point Sur Light. It also has two fourth order Fresnel lenses. The Coast Guard made it an official navigational marker in 1979.

The lighthouse is part of Gibbs' home, which also houses a private museum. The grounds and tower are closed to the public, however they are visible from U.S. Route 101 near mile marker 166. It is just outside the northwest corner of the Cape Perpetua National Scenic Area.

Gibbs died at home on 30 April 2010. His daughter and son-in-law—who lived at the property for 27 years with Gibbs—intended to maintain the lighthouse as an official aid to navigation. The facility is still closed to the public.

Cleft of the Rock is named after Fanny Crosby's hymn He Hideth My Soul in the Cleft of the Rock, which is based on Exodus 33:22.

== See also ==
- List of lighthouses on the Oregon Coast
