= North Fork of the Yachats Bridge =

Covered bridge in Oregon, US

- U.S. National Register of Historic Places
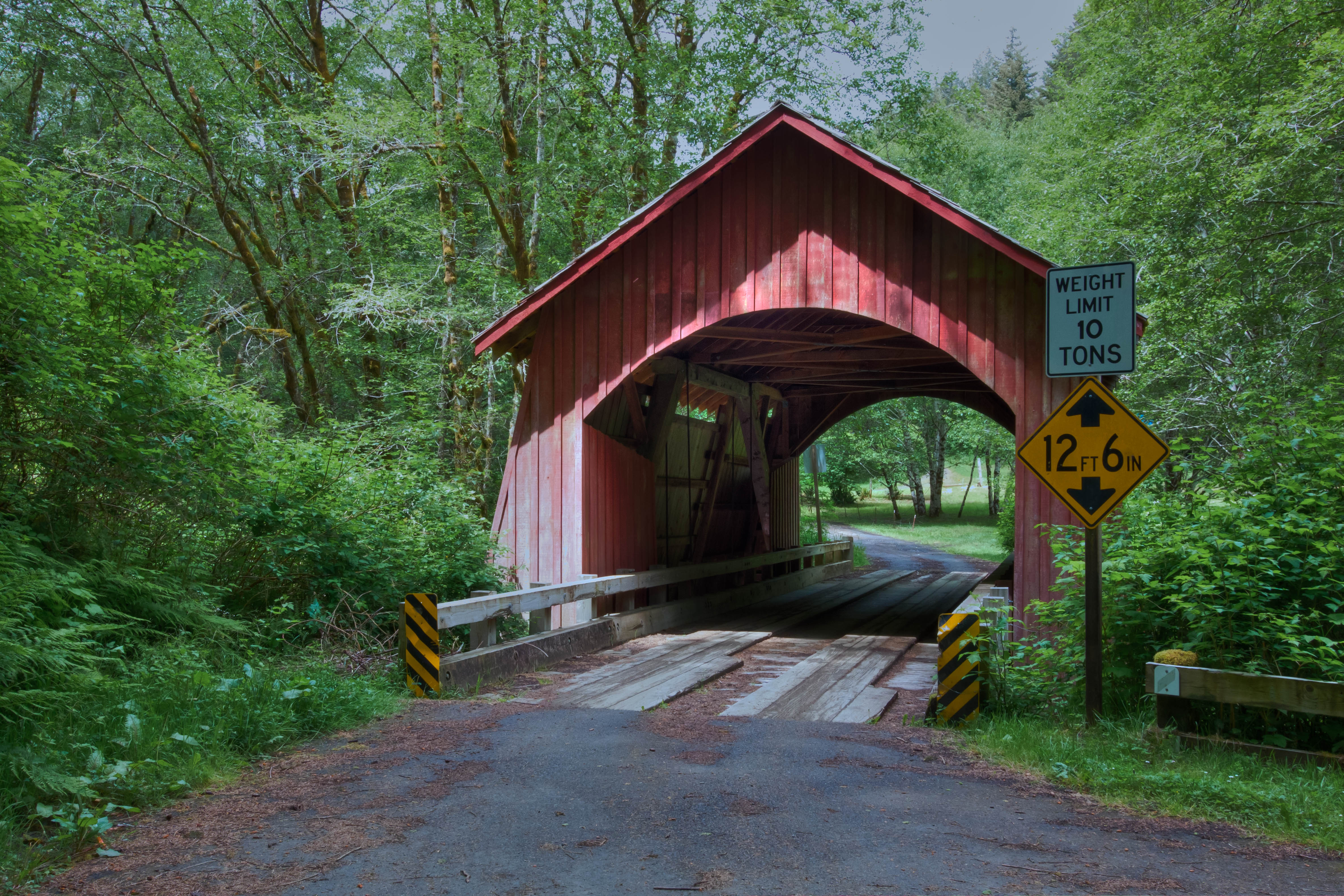
- North Fork Yachats Bridge in 2012

- Location within Oregon Location within the United States
- Nearest city: Yachats
- Coordinates: 44°18′35.9″N 123°58′10.9″W
- Built: 1938
- Built by: Otis Hamer
- Architectural style: Queen post truss
- MPS: Oregon Covered Bridges TR
- NRHP reference No.: 79002108
- Listed: November 29, 1979

The North Fork of the Yachats Bridge is a covered bridge in Lincoln County in the U.S. state of Oregon. The bridge carries North Fork Yachats River Road over the north fork of the Yachats River, about 9 miles (14 km) northeast (by river roads) of Yachats and the Pacific Ocean. The structure was added to the National Register of Historic Places in 1979.

Otis Hamer, a veteran constructor of bridges, built the queen post truss structure for Lincoln County in 1938. It was the last of his covered bridges.

At 42 feet (13 m) long, the bridge is one of the shortest covered bridges in Oregon. It is one of only two covered bridges in Lincoln County that are open to vehicular traffic; the other is the Chitwood Bridge. The weight limit on the bridge is ten tons; large trucks and recreational vehicles (RV)s are not allowed.

After an accident damaged the bridge in 1987, county crews repaired it. They returned in 1989 for a more complete renovation, including new trusses, approaches, a new roof and new siding.

== See also ==
- List of bridges on the National Register of Historic Places in Oregon
- List of Oregon covered bridges
