= Yachats Ocean Road State Natural Site =

State park near Newport, Oregon, United States

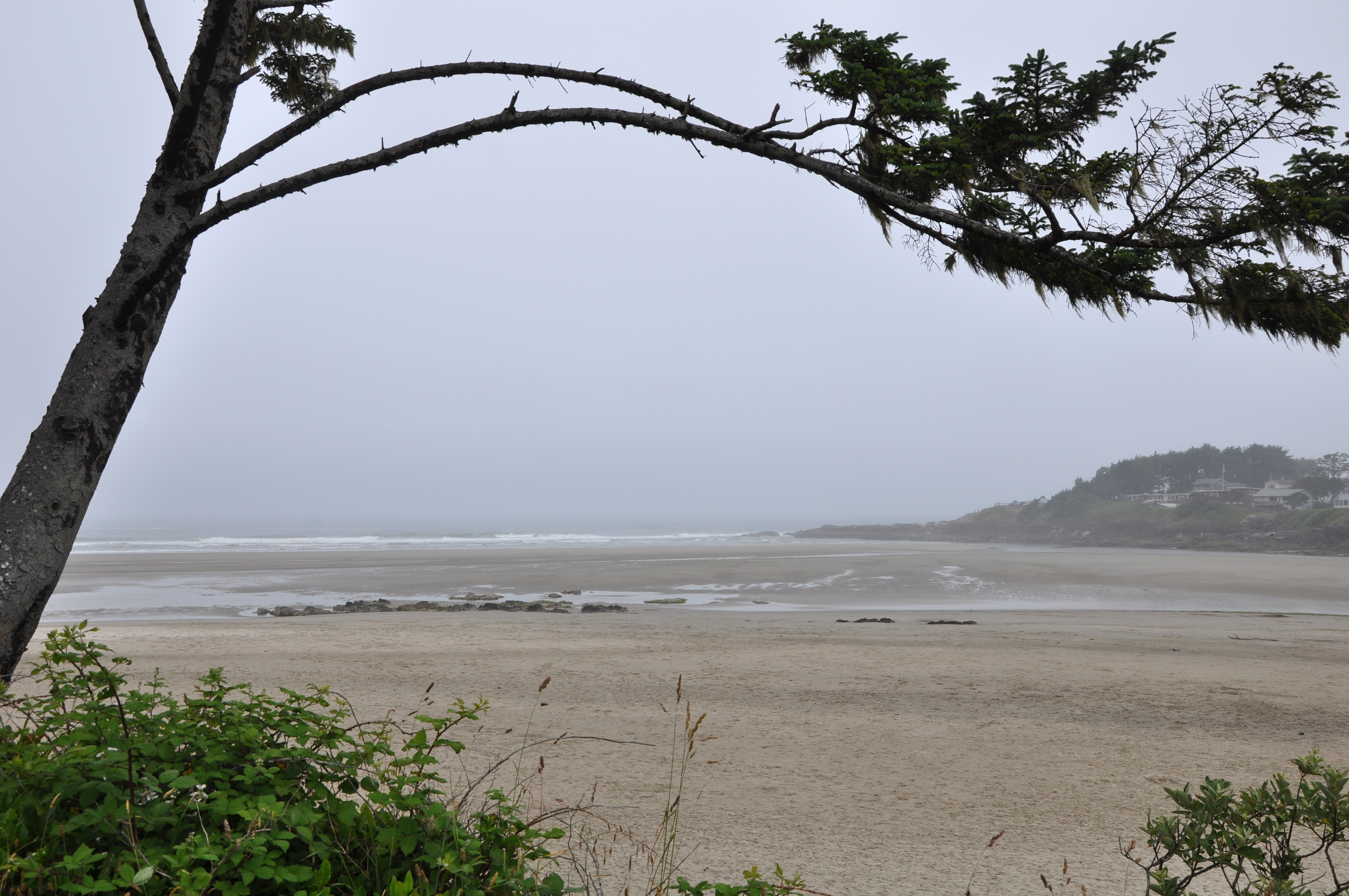
- Looking north from Yachats Ocean Road

- Location within Oregon Location within the United States
- Type: Public, state
- Location: Lincoln County, Oregon, United States
- Nearest city: Waldport
- Coordinates: 44°18′18″N 124°06′24″W
- Operator: Oregon Parks and Recreation Department

The Yachats Ocean Road State Natural Site is a state park in southern Lincoln County, Oregon, in the town of Yachats. It is administered by the Oregon Parks and Recreation Department. It is located on the Pacific Ocean coast, adjacent to the Oregon Coast Highway and the mouth of the Yachats River. The park is open for day use only, and offers scenic driving on a 1-mile (1.6 km) loop, and wildlife and surf viewing, but is backed on its landward side by low-intensity urban development.

== See also ==
- List of Oregon State Parks
- Yachats State Recreation Area
