= James A. Gibbs =

American historian

- Born: January 17, 1922; Seattle
- Died: April 30, 2010 (aged 88) home at Cleft of the Rock Light
- Occupations: Historian, lighthouse keeper

James A. Gibbs (January 17, 1922 – April 30, 2010) was a United States author, lighthouse keeper, and maritime historian.

He was one of the lighthouse keepers at Tillamook Rock Light for a year beginning in 1945. In 1948 Gibbs was one of the five founders of the Puget Sound Maritime Historical Society. He was the editor of Marine Digest magazine until 1972.

He built and lived in Cleft of the Rock Light near Yachats, Oregon, "the first privately owned working lighthouse in Oregon" until his death on April 30, 2010.

== Works ==
- James Gibbs, Jr. (1993) [1950, 1964]. Pacific Graveyard: A Narrative of the Ships Lost Where the Columbia River Meets the Pacific Ocean. Binford & Mort Pub. ISBN 978-0-8323-0481-1.
- James A. Gibbs, Jr. (1955). Sentinels of the North Pacific: The Story of Pacific Coast Lighthouses and Lightships. Binfords & Mort.
- Jim Gibbs (1968). West Coast Windjammers in Story and Pictures. Superior Publishing Company. ISBN 978-0-517-17060-1.
- Jim Gibbs (1978) [1971]. Disaster Log of Ships-a Pictorial Account of Shipwrecks, California to Alaska. Superior Publishing Company. ISBN 978-0-517-16982-7.
- Jim Gibbs; Joe D. Williamson (1976). Maritime Memories of Puget Sound, in Photographs and Text. Schiffer Pub. ISBN 978-0-88740-044-5.
- James A. Gibbs (1986). Lighthouses of the Pacific. Schiffer Pub. ISBN 978-0-88740-054-4.
- Jim Gibbs (1997) [1986]. Peril at Sea: a Photographic Study of Shipwrecks in the Pacific. Schiffer Pub. ISBN 978-0-88740-066-7.
- Jim Gibbs; Chad Ehlers (1989) [1981]. Sentinels of Solitude: West Coast Lighthouses. EZ Nature Books. ISBN 978-0-945092-06-3.
- Jim Gibbs; Phillip Drucker (1997) [1987]. Windjammers of the Pacific Rim. Schiffer Pub. ISBN 978-0-88740-086-5.
- James A. Gibbs (1997). Lighthouses of the Pacific. Schiffer Pub. ISBN 978-0-88740-054-4.
- James A. Gibbs; Bert Webber (June 2003). Oregon's Seacoast Lighthouses: Oregon Documentary, Includes Nearby Shipwrecks. Webb Research. ISBN 978-0-936738-57-4.
- James A. Gibbs (April 2007). Lighthouses of the Pacific. Schiffer Publishing, Limited. ISBN 978-0-7643-2463-5.
- Jim Gibbs (2007) [1969, 1987]. Pacific Square-Riggers: Pictorial History of the Great Windships of Yesteryear. Schiffer Pub. ISBN 978-0-88740-106-0.
- James A. Gibbs Jr. (1953). Tillamook Light. ISBN 978-0832303340
