= Speeder (motor vessel) =

Motor launched which was formally named Bainbridge

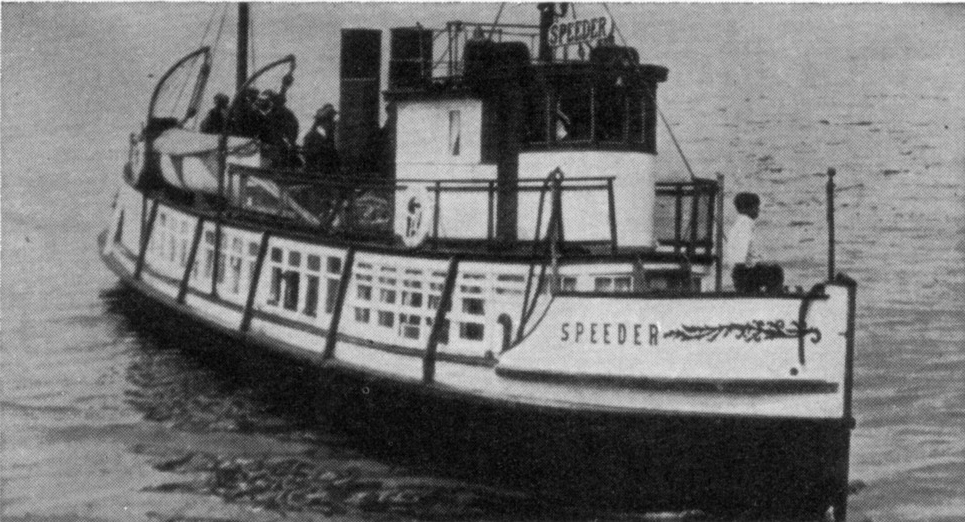
- Speeder (circa 1922).

History
- Name: Speeder (ex Bainbridge)
- Route: Puget Sound, San Juan Islands
- In service: 1908
- Identification: US registry # 205199
- Fate: Operational as of 1966

General characteristics
- Type: inland motor launch
- Tonnage: as built (1908) : 39 gross, 26 registered tons
- Length: as built (1908) : 79 ft (24.08 m); as rebuilt (1922) : 87 ft (26.52 m)
- Beam: 12.5 ft (3.81 m)
- Depth: 4.5 ft (1.37 m)
- Capacity: 100 passengers

Speeder was a motor launch built in 1908 which served on Puget Sound and in the San Juan Islands. From 1908 to 1922 this vessel was named Bainbridge.

== Design and construction ==
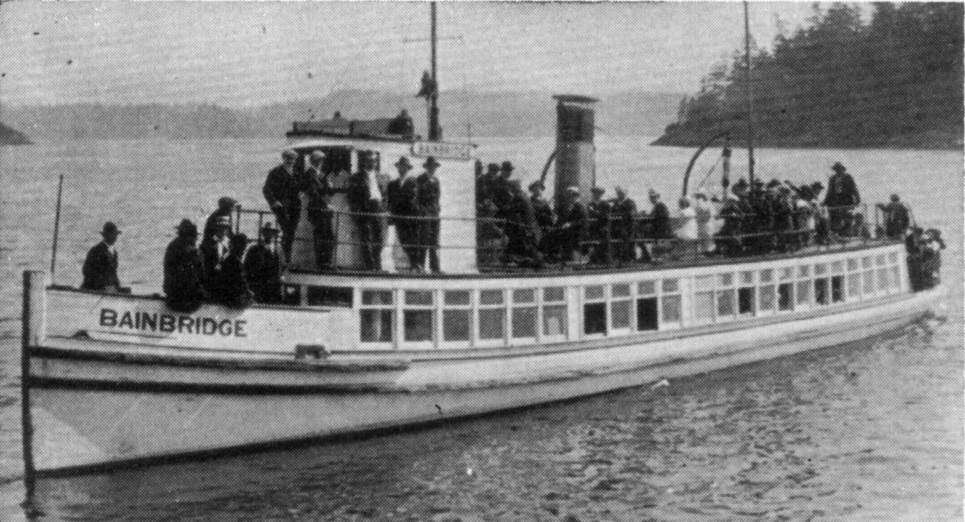
Bainbridge as built.

Speeder was built in 1908 at Seattle, Washington for the Eagle Harbor Transportation Company The original name of the vessel was Bainbridge.

As originally built, the vessel was 79 feet (24 m) long, 12.5 feet (3.8 m) beam, and 4.5 feet (1.4 m) in depth of hold. Overall size was 39 gross and 26 registered tons. Only two crew were required according to the 1911 merchant vessel registry. As of 1911, the vessel was powered with a gasoline engine that generated 80 indicated horsepower. The vessel's U.S. Registry number was 205199.

Bainbridge was built to run on the Seattle-Bainbridge Island route and was the fastest vessel of the type yet constructed when built.

== Career ==
In 1910 Bainbridge was purchased by the Puget Sound Navigation Company. PSN was then engaged in a strong competition with the Kitsap County Transportation Company, which had deployed a similar vessel, the gasoline launch Doncella to run against Bainbridge. There was a near-collision between the two vessels off Duwamish Head, in which, it was reported at the time that “'women fainted in fright.'” As a result of this incident, charges were brought against Capt. Carl Freese of the Bainbridge and Capt. George W. Keeney of Doncella.

In 1911 the original gasoline engine was replaced with a new 75 horsepower Troyer-Fox gasoline engine assembled by the Astoria Iron Works, of Astoria, Oregon.

In 1922, Captain Norman I. Drigge, of Friday Harbor, Washington had Bainbridge rebuilt at the Jensen shipyard in Friday Harbor. He renamed the vessel Speeder. A 90-horsepower Gulwosen-Grei diesel engine was installed, and the rebuilt vessel had two smoke stacks. Following reconstruction, the vessel was 87 feet (27 m) long and had a passenger capacity of 100 persons. Under Driggs, Speeder was run between Bellingham and Anacortes, Washington by way of points in the San Juan Islands, including Deer Harbor, Orcas, Shaw Island, and Friday Harbor.

In 1924, Speeder with other motor launches, including Alverene were running in the San Juan Islands, and facing heavy competition from the powerful Crosby Marine Corporation, which had placed the ferry Mount Vernon on the San Juan route. Speeder was later operated on the Bellingham-San Juan Islands by the W.H. Kasch Navigation Co., owners of Alverene.

In 1927, Speeder was back in the ownership of Eagle Harbor Transportation Company, whose principals then were E.L. Frank and J.B. Burns. In that year, Franks and Burns sold their two vessels, Speeder and the steamer Bainbridge to Kitsap County Transportation Company through an intermediary, Arthur E. Burr. Kitsap County Navigation Company was then under the control of John L. Anderson, whose wish to acquire the state-issued route certificate held by Eagle Harbor Transportation Co. was the motive for the purchase. E.L. Frank stayed on as chief engineer of the Bainbridge after the ownership transfer. KCTC put Speeder on the Seattle-Winslow route.

== Later years ==
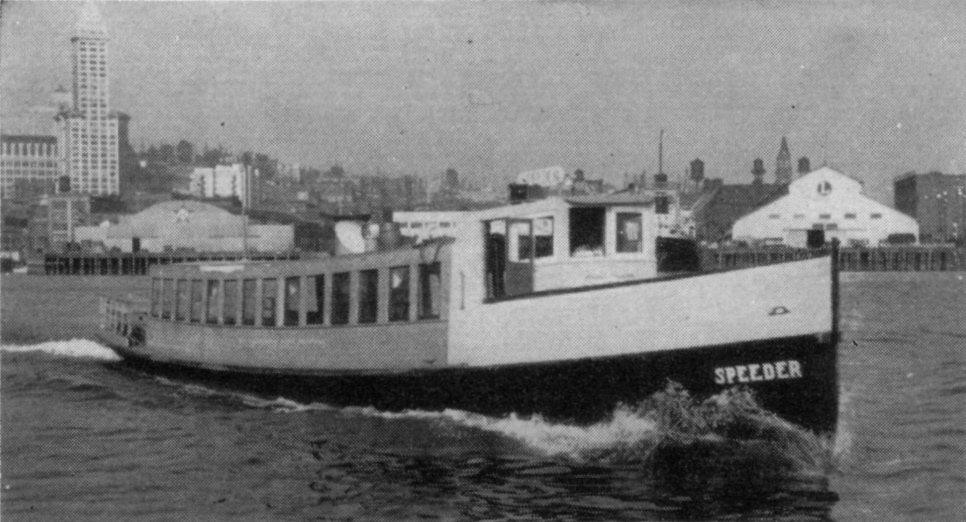
Speeder with modified cabin structure, 1942 or later.

In 1935 Speeder came into the ownership of Puget Sound Navigation Co. when PSN acquired Kitsap County Transportation Co. and the entire KCTC fleet. Speeder was not operated by PSN however, and seems to have been idle for a number of years following the purchase. In 1942, Speeder was acquired by Boles Harbor Island Ferries. The cabins of the vessel were cut down and the vessel was then and placed on a route running shipyard workers from downtown Seattle to the yards on Harbor Island. Master of the vessel in this service was Joe D. Williamson, who later became known as a prominent maritime photographer. It is also reported that Speeder made runs to Bremerton during this period.

As of 1966, Speeder was still operational, and was then owned by Seattle Pacific University.
