= Joe D. Williamson =

American photographer and historian

- Born: March 28, 1909
- Died: February 26, 1994 (aged 84)
- Occupations: Sailor and photographer

Joe D. Williamson (March 28, 1909 – February 26, 1994) was a sailor and a maritime photographer and historian who worked in the Puget Sound region.

== Career ==
In 1937 Williamson opened his own photograph shop on the Seattle Waterfront, near Colman Dock and the Grand Trunk Pacific dock. During World War II, Williamson was master of the motor vessel Speeder which transported shipyard workers from downtown Seattle to shipyards on Harbor Island.

In 1948, Williamson was one of the five founders of the Puget Sound Maritime Historical Society ("PSMHS"). He was also its first president, serving from 1948 to 1950. In 1959, Williamson was doing business as Marine Transportation Company, and owned a 45-foot long harbor launch, the Susan Jane, which was powered by a 141 horsepower (105 kW) gasoline engine. In 1959, he sold the Susan Jane to Boyd Burchard. Williamson also owned a motor yacht called Photo Queen, which was 50 feet long. In 1962, Williamson closed his photograph shop and moved to Bainbridge Island, Washington.

Williamson's collection of over 35,000 maritime photographs was purchased by the Puget Sound Maritime Historical Society in 1980. It was said of Williamson that he would one day be considered the equal of the famous logging photographer Darius Kinsey (1869–1945).

== Authorship ==
Williamson was listed as the co-author or a contributor in a number of books, including:

- Gibbs, Jim A., and Williamson, Joe D., Maritime Memories of Puget Sound, Schiffer Publishing, West Chester PA 1987 ISBN 0-88740-044-2
- Newell, Gordon R., and Williamson, Joe D., Pacific Coastal Liners, Superior Publishing, Seattle WA (Bonanza Books ed. 1959).
- Newell, Gordon R., and Williamson, Joe D., Pacific Steamboats, Superior Publishing, Seattle WA (1958)
- Newell, Gordon R., and Williamson, Joe D., Pacific Tugboats, Superior Publishing, Seattle, WA (1957)
