= Puget Sound Maritime Historical Society =

- Formation: 1948
- Type: Historical society
- Headquarters: Seattle, Washington
- Website: http://www.pugetmaritime.org/

The Puget Sound Maritime Historical Society (PSMHS) is located in Seattle, WA.

== Publications ==
They provide publications such as:

- Sea Chest, a quarterly journal or newsletter that reaches over 700 members.
- Alaska Steam
- Glory of the Sea
- From the Bridge

== History and organizational structure ==
The Puget Sound Maritime Historical Society, was founded in 1948 by Joe D. Williamson, James A. Gibbs Jr., Austen D. Hemion, Thomas E. Sandry, and Robert Leithead. Since that time, the society has had forty Presidents. The PSMHS is an independent 501(c)3 non-profit run by volunteer support. The board, officers, and key staff are volunteer positions.

== Partnership and collections ==
The society has a partnership with the Museum of History and Industry (MOHAI), which they have maintained for over 50 years. They collaborate on both short and long term exhibits open to the public. They also collaborate on public programming oriented toward the PSMHS audience and share storage and exhibit space. They are currently involved in the planning for new exhibit galleries at the South Lake Union Armory Building, which is being renovated with a presumed opening date in 2012.

=== Puget Sound Maritime History Museum ===
The Puget Sound Maritime History Museum is located at Chandler's Cove at South Lake Union. People can also visit the PSMHS collection and library at MOHAI. The PSMHS collection includes more than 2500 objects, such as ship models and other artifacts; more than 70,000 negatives, prints, and slides. They also have more than 5000 entries in their library catalog and 6000 entries specifically of ship plans and ephemera. Specific photographic collections include the Williamson Historical, Austen D. Hemion, and the Lloyd Stadum collections.

== See also ==
- List of historical societies in Washington (state)

== References and external links ==
- http://www.pugetmaritime.org/, retrieved April 2009.
- https://web.archive.org/web/20060909033642/http://www.seattlehistory.org/, retrieved April 2009.
- http://www.destinationheritage.org/maritime.html, retrieved April 2009.
