= Devils Churn =

Narrow inlet on the Oregon Coast, United States

Coordinates: 44°17′04″N 124°06′40″W

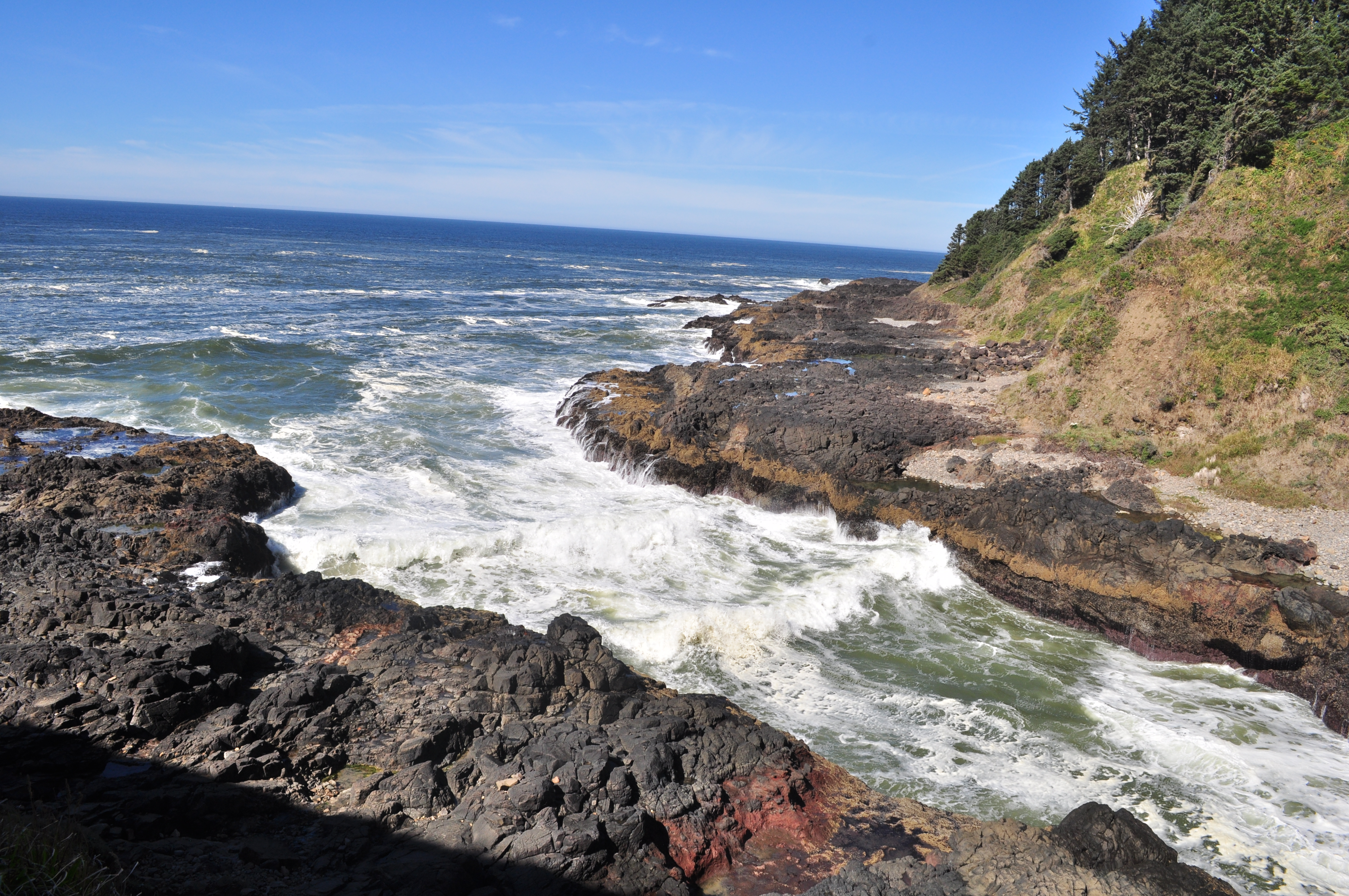

Devils Churn is a narrow inlet of the Pacific Ocean in Lincoln County, Oregon, United States, south of Yachats. It is located in the Siuslaw National Forest and is accessible via the Restless Waters trail from the Cape Perpetua Scenic Area visitor center or the U.S. Route 101 overlook. Access to the trail requires a United States Forest Service pass.

The inlet developed over many thousands of years as wave action carved into the basalt shoreline, first forming a deep sea cave whose roof eventually collapsed. As the tide comes in it can throw spray several hundred feet into the air when the waves reach the end of the churn. Visitors are urged to be cautious when visiting the churn, as it can be dangerous. In 2021, a man visiting the churn died from drowning after attempting to jump across the water.
