= Smelt Sands State Recreation Site =

State park in Oregon, United States

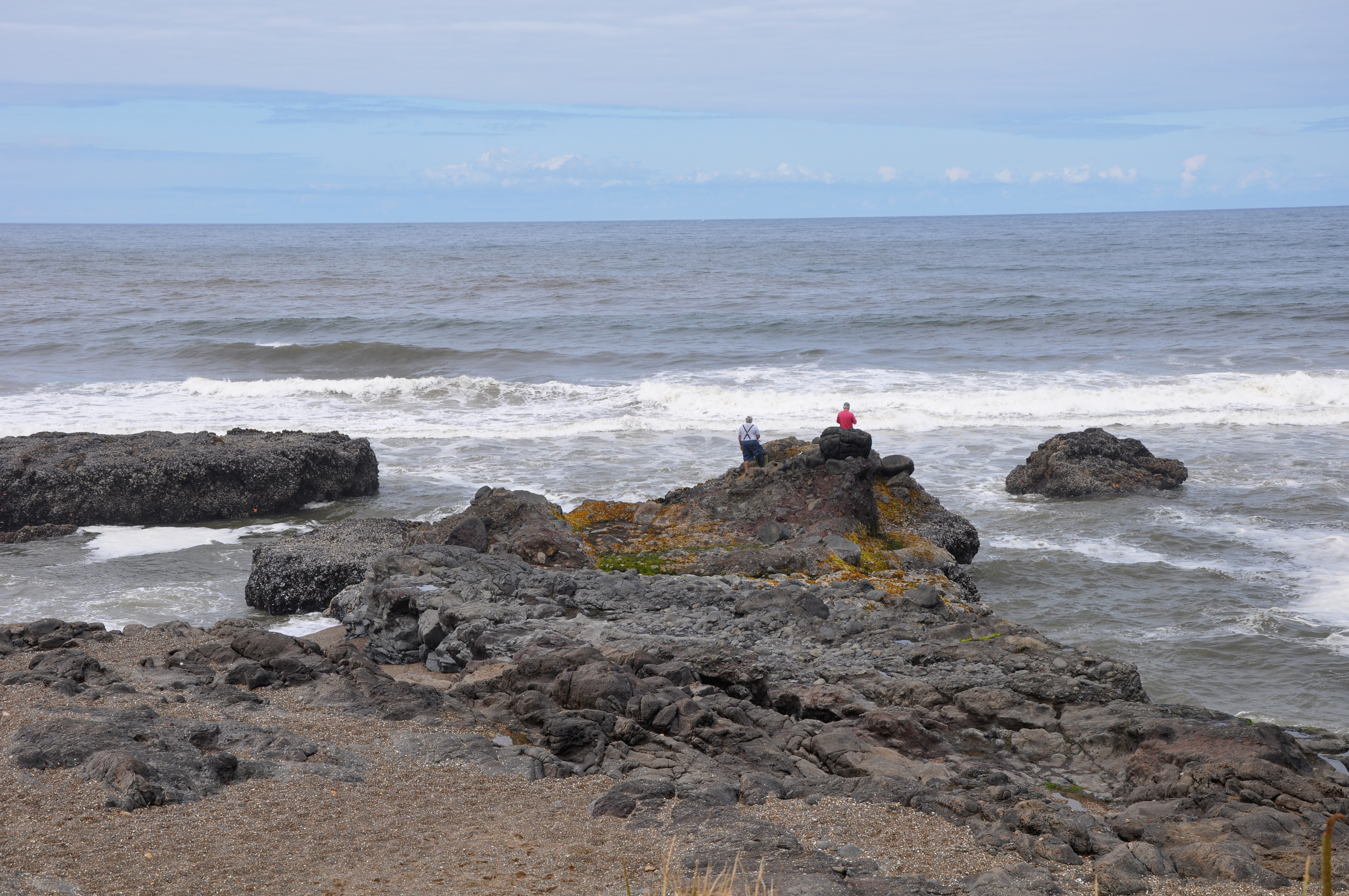
- Fishing at Smelt Sands

- Location within Oregon Location within the United States
- Type: Public, state
- Location: Yachats, Lincoln County, Oregon
- Coordinates: 44°19′19″N 124°06′21″W
- Operator: Oregon Parks and Recreation Department

Smelt Sands State Recreation Site is a state park in the U.S. state of Oregon, administered by the Oregon Parks and Recreation Department.

== See also ==
- List of Oregon state parks
