= Yachats, Oregon =

- City
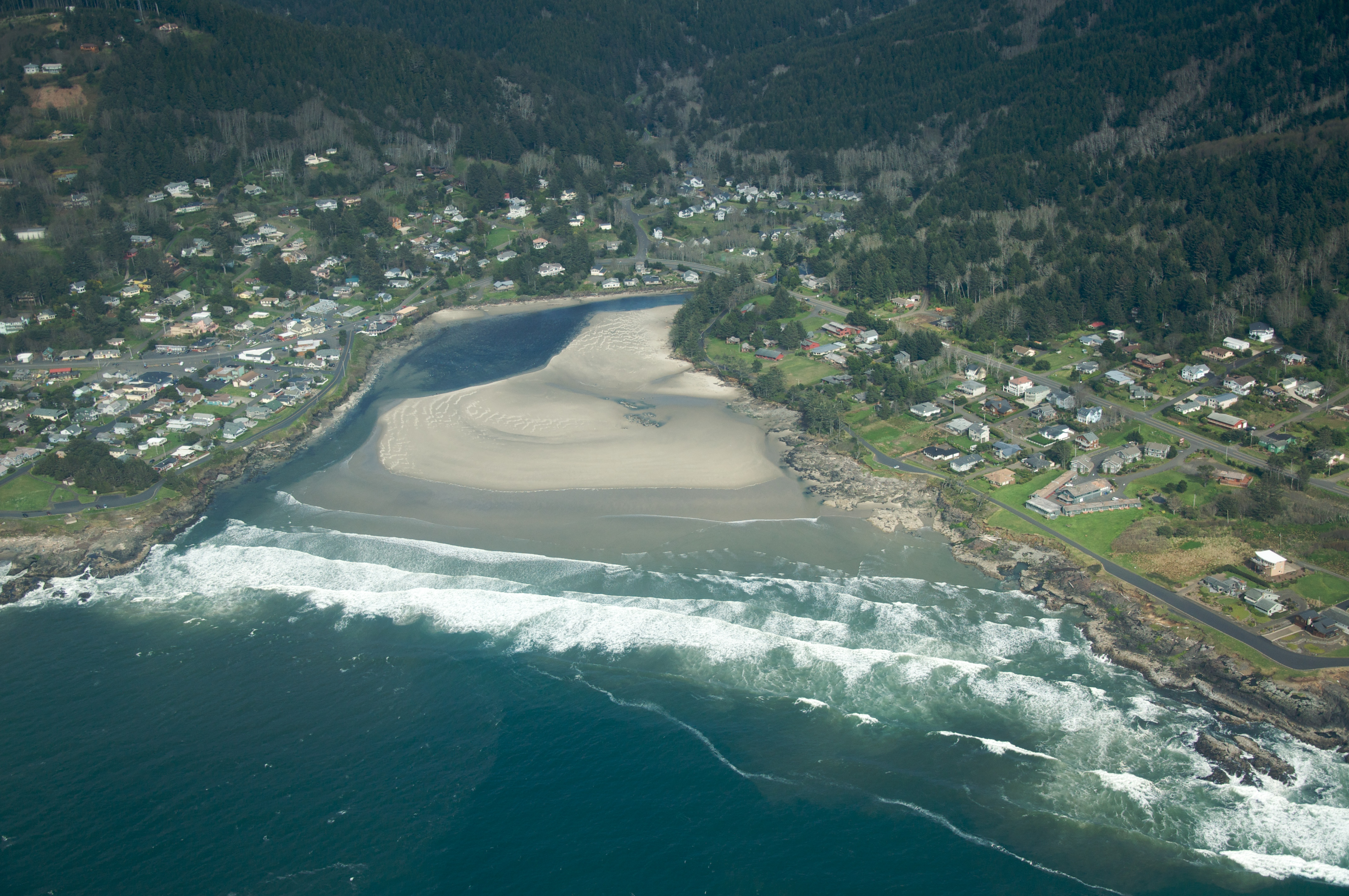
- Aerial view of Yachats
- Nickname: Home of the World's Largest Ocean
- Motto: Gem of the Oregon Coast
- Location in Oregon
- Coordinates: 44°18′46″N 124°06′08″W
- Country: United States
- State: Oregon
- County: Lincoln
- Incorporated: 1967

Government
  - Mayor: Craig Berdie

Area
  - Total: 0.92 sq mi (2.39 km^{2})
  - Land: 0.91 sq mi (2.36 km^{2})
  - Water: 0.012 sq mi (0.03 km^{2})
- Elevation: 190 ft (58 m)

Population (2020)
  - Total: 994
  - Density: 1,091.5/sq mi (421.43/km^{2})
  - Demonym: Yachatian (yah-HAY-shun)
- Time zone: UTC-8 (Pacific)
  - Summer (DST): UTC-7 (Pacific)
- ZIP code: 97498
- Area code: 541
- FIPS code: 41-84200
- GNIS feature ID: 2412313
- Website: yachatsoregon.org

Yachats (/ˈjɑːhɑːts/ YAH-hahts) is a small coastal city in the southernmost area of Lincoln County, Oregon, United States. According to Oregon Geographic Names, the name comes from the Siletz language and means "at the foot of the mountain". There is a range of differing etymologies. William Bright says the name comes from the Alsea placename yáx̣ayk^{y} (IPA: /ˈjaχajkʲ/). At the 2020 census, the city's population was 994.

== History ==
Archeological studies have shown that the Yachats area has been inhabited for at least 1,500 years. Remains of a pit-house in Yachats have been radiocarbon dated at approximately AD 570 . Yachats is built on seashell middens and numerous graves left by its past inhabitants. Excavations for construction of buildings and U.S. Route 101 uncovered a great many skeletons and artifacts. Most of these became part of the fill dirt forming the base of the current highway and city.

For many centuries, the Native Americans in this area were hunter-gatherers who migrated between summer camps and winter residences. The Alsea Tribe had as many as 20 permanent villages (used on an annually rotating basis) on the Alsea River and the central Oregon coast. Archeological and linguistic evidence support the existence of a southern Alsea village known as the Yahuch band, located on the coast at the Yachats River. By 1860, the Yahuch band was extinct, many having succumbed to European diseases such as smallpox and tuberculosis.

In order to open up land in the Coos Bay area for homesteading in the early 1860s, the U.S. Army forcibly marched the Coos and Lower Umpqua Indians 80 miles (130 km) north over rugged terrain to the Alsea Sub-Agency reservation in Yachats where the peaceful Indians, treated by the Army as though they were prisoners of war, were incarcerated. Amanda's Trail, named for a blind Indian woman who suffered greatly on the march, was dedicated on July 19, 2009. The trail climbs 800 feet (240 m) from downtown Yachats to the summit of Cape Perpetua where it links with the extensive trail system of the Siuslaw National Forest.

In Yachats the hunter-gatherer tribes were forced to learn to make a living by agriculture. Crops planted near the ocean failed, resulting in many deaths from starvation. Approximately 300 Indians died in just 10 years. Twelve years after the Alsea Sub-Agency had opened, the Indians were allowed to establish a trail and develop agricultural plots up the Yachats River Valley, where they were able to grow potatoes, oats, wheat, and corn. They were also allowed to return to hunting. Once the Indians had built a new life there, the U.S. government opened up the area for homesteading in 1875, and once again, forced the Indians to move—some returned to their ancestral homelands, others went 40 miles (64 km) north to the Siletz Reservation. Many of the Indians died during this relocation.

Homesteaders used the Indian farms and trails to develop the Yachats area. In 1892 the first post office was established in Yachats (called Oceanview until it was renamed Yachats in 1917). Until Yachats could be reached by a macadam road, rains made it impossible for the mail to be carried by car. The Roosevelt Memorial Highway (now Highway 101), carved out of the rock of Cape Perpetua in 1931, changed all this by opening up a route from the town of Florence. Despite the early difficulties of reaching Yachats, the tourist industry began in 1905 with the conversion of a chittum bark warehouse into the first hotel. Today tourism is the city's main industry.

Yachats was part of the war effort in both world wars. Spruce was needed for airplanes during World War I, and in 1918 the U.S. Army Signal Corps under the Spruce Production Division wanted to commence logging of the Blodgett Tract area, an area about 2 miles (3.2 km) north of Yachats. A 23.5-mile-long (37.8 km) logging railroad, the Alsea Southern Railroad, needed for transporting logs to the Yaquina River was completed by the Spruce Production Division from South Beach, Oregon (near Newport, Oregon) to Yachats on November 8, 1918, just three days before the war ended. Logs could then be floated on the river to the mill in Toledo, Oregon. A private company, the Pacific Spruce Corporation under its Manary Logging Company subsidiary, purchased the railroad and completed a large centralized logging facility called "Camp 1" north of Yachats in September 1922. Camp 1 contained a machine shop, locomotive shed, bunkhouses, bungalows, mess hall, school, and commissary. Manary Logging and its successors continued the logging operations in the area until 1937.

Early in World War II, the West Shelter built by the Civilian Conservation Corps (CCC) near the top of Cape Perpetua was used as an observation site and radar station for the detection of enemy submarines and aircraft. In Yachats, foxholes and gun emplacements were installed along the ocean drive. Military personnel were housed in a local skating rink and the Ladies Club was rented for recreation. After the war, the U.S. Coast Guard discovered Japanese mines that had floated onto the beaches. These were hauled out to sea and destroyed.

The Little Log Church is a historical museum displaying many artifacts relating to Yachats's past. The church, built in 1926, was designed in the shape of a cross. Sir Robert Perks, who owned most of Yachats at the time, provided the property; the logs were donated as well and the work was contributed by local citizens. The museum is now owned by the city.

== Demographics ==
Historical population
Census	Pop.	Note	%±
1970	441		—
1980	482		9.3%
1990	533		10.6%
2000	617		15.8%
2010	690		11.8%
2020	994		44.1%
U.S. Decennial Census

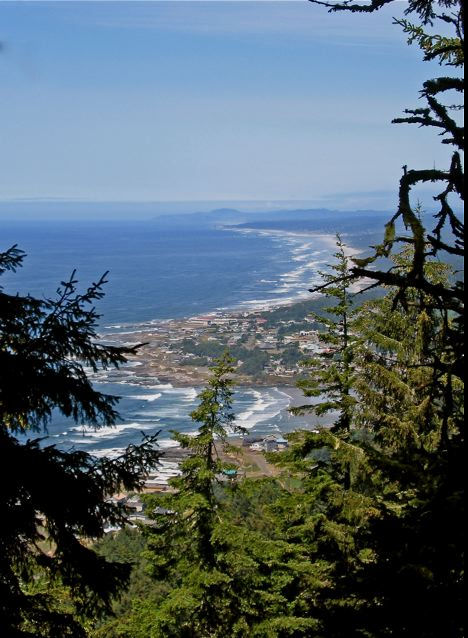
Yachats from Cape Perpetua

=== 2020 census ===
As of the 2020 census, Yachats had a population of 994. The median age was 65.4 years. 8.0% of residents were under the age of 18 and 51.0% of residents were 65 years of age or older. For every 100 females there were 83.7 males, and for every 100 females age 18 and over there were 82.4 males age 18 and over.

99.2% of residents lived in urban areas, while 0.8% lived in rural areas.

There were 559 households in Yachats, of which 11.3% had children under the age of 18 living in them. Of all households, 40.4% were married-couple households, 18.6% were households with a male householder and no spouse or partner present, and 33.6% were households with a female householder and no spouse or partner present. About 42.2% of all households were made up of individuals and 29.0% had someone living alone who was 65 years of age or older.

There were 961 housing units, of which 41.8% were vacant. Among occupied housing units, 64.4% were owner-occupied and 35.6% were renter-occupied. The homeowner vacancy rate was 3.9% and the rental vacancy rate was 5.6%.

Racial composition as of the 2020 census
Race	Number	Percent
White	888	89.3%
Black or African American	2	0.2%
American Indian and Alaska Native	6	0.6%
Asian	5	0.5%
Native Hawaiian and Other Pacific Islander	0	0%
Some other race	28	2.8%
Two or more races	65	6.5%
Hispanic or Latino (of any race)	59	5.9%

=== 2010 census ===
As of the United States Census of 2010, there were 690 people, 400 households, and 198 families residing in the city. The population density was 758.2 inhabitants per square mile (292.7/km^{2}). There were 807 housing units at an average density of 886.8 per square mile (342.4/km^{2}). The racial makeup of the city was 95.2% White, 0.1% African American, 1.7% Native American, 0.6% Asian, 0.7% from other races, and 1.6% from two or more races. Hispanic or Latino residents of any race were 4.8% of the population.

There were 400 households, of which 5.8% had children under the age of 18 living with them, 40.8% were married couples living together, 7.5% had a female householder with no husband present, 1.3% had a male householder with no wife present, and 50.5% were non-families. 42.8% of all households were made up of individuals, and 22.3% had someone living alone who was 65 years of age or older. The average household size was 1.72 and the average family size was 2.22.

The median age in the city was 62.3 years. 4.9% of residents were under the age of 18; 3.4% were between the ages of 18 and 24; 10.8% were from 25 to 44; 39.5% were from 45 to 64; and 41.4% were 65 years of age or older. The gender makeup of the city was 46.7% male and 53.3% female.

=== 2000 census ===
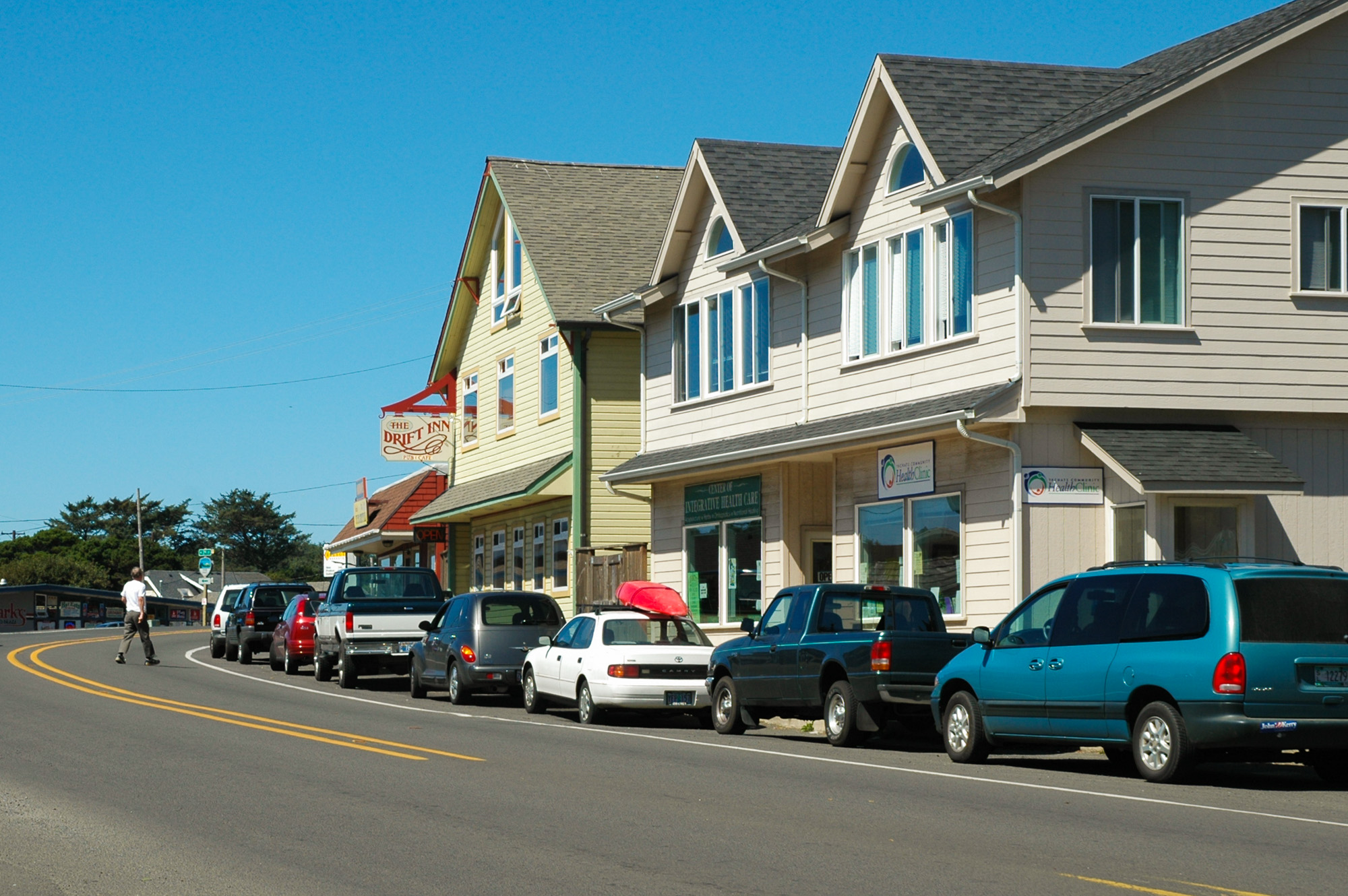
Highway 101 through Yachats, 2004

As of the census of 2000, there were 617 people, 333 households, and 185 families residing in the city. The population density was 693.1 inhabitants per square mile (267.6/km^{2}). There were 619 housing units at an average density of 695.3 per square mile (268.5/km^{2}). The racial makeup of the city was 96.27% White, 0.16% African American, 0.32% Native American, 0.81% Asian, and 2.43% from two or more races. Hispanic or Latino of any race were 2.76% of the population.

There were 333 households, out of which 10.5% had children under the age of 18 living with them, 46.8% were married couples living together, 7.2% had a female householder with no husband present, and 44.4% were non-families. 37.8% of all households were made up of individuals, and 15.3% had someone living alone who was 65 years of age or older. The average household size was 1.85 and the average family size was 2.34.

In the city, the population was spread out, with 11.7% under the age of 18, 3.9% from 18 to 24, 13.0% from 25 to 44, 39.4% from 45 to 64, and 32.1% who were 65 years of age or older. The median age was 56 years. For every 100 females, there were 83.6 males. For every 100 females age 18 and over, there were 82.3 males.

The median income for a household in the city was $32,308, and the median income for a family was $41,250. Males had a median income of $36,875 versus $31,806 for females. The per capita income for the city was $24,143. About 12.8% of families and 14.1% of the population were below the poverty line, including 34.7% of those under age 18 and none of those age 65 or over.

Of city residents age 25 or older in 2000, 94.0% achieved a high school education or higher, compared to the national average of 80.4%, and 40.3% held a bachelor's degree or higher compared to 24.4% nationally.

== Economy ==
The principal industries of Lincoln County are lumber, fishing, tourism and recreation, and food products manufacturing. Tourism is Yachats's main industry.

== Geography ==
Yachats is the southernmost city in Lincoln County. It is bounded by the Central Oregon Coast Range on the east and the Pacific Ocean on the west. To the south is a rugged portion of highway around and just south of Cape Perpetua, connecting the city to Lane County on U.S. Route 101. Yachats is almost exactly equidistant between the two most populous coastal cities in Lincoln and Lane counties, respectively, being 23 miles (37 km) north of Florence, 8 miles (13 km) south of Waldport, and 23 miles (37 km) south of Newport. The city straddles the Yachats River and estuary. According to the United States Census Bureau, the city has a total area of 0.92 square miles (2.38 km^{2}), of which 0.91 square miles (2.36 km^{2}) is land and 0.01 square miles (0.03 km^{2}) is water.

=== Climate ===
The climate of Yachats is relatively mild throughout the year because of the moderating effects of the ocean currents. Temperatures rarely drop below 30 °F (−1 °C) in the winter or rise above 75 °F (24 °C) in the summer. The highest recorded temperature, however, was 100 °F (38 °C) in July 1961 and the record low was 1 °F (−17 °C) in December 1972. Snow is uncommon and only occurs in rare offshore flow events with deformation banding in Arctic fronts and overrunning low pressure systems that move inland to the south, but rainfall is quite heavy through the winter months and several storms come out of the Gulf of Alaska each winter.

Climate data for Yachats, Oregon (1991–2020)
Month	Jan	Feb	Mar	Apr	May	Jun	Jul	Aug	Sep	Oct	Nov	Dec	Year
Mean daily maximum °F (°C)	53.3 (11.8)	53.8 (12.1)	54.7 (12.6)	56.8 (13.8)	59.1 (15.1)	62.2 (16.8)	64.2 (17.9)	64.6 (18.1)	64.5 (18.1)	61.2 (16.2)	55.7 (13.2)	52.4 (11.3)	58.5 (14.7)
Daily mean °F (°C)	47.9 (8.8)	47.5 (8.6)	48.2 (9.0)	50.1 (10.1)	53.1 (11.7)	56.2 (13.4)	58.0 (14.4)	58.2 (14.6)	57.4 (14.1)	54.5 (12.5)	50.0 (10.0)	46.6 (8.1)	52.3 (11.3)
Mean daily minimum °F (°C)	42.4 (5.8)	41.3 (5.2)	41.6 (5.3)	43.3 (6.3)	47.2 (8.4)	50.2 (10.1)	51.8 (11.0)	51.7 (10.9)	50.3 (10.2)	47.7 (8.7)	44.4 (6.9)	40.8 (4.9)	46.1 (7.8)
Average precipitation inches (mm)	11.85 (301)	8.74 (222)	9.66 (245)	6.56 (167)	4.35 (110)	3.07 (78)	0.91 (23)	0.91 (23)	2.09 (53)	6.24 (158)	10.72 (272)	13.19 (335)	78.29 (1,987)
Average snowfall inches (cm)	0.3 (0.76)	0.4 (1.0)	0.0 (0.0)	0.0 (0.0)	0.0 (0.0)	0.0 (0.0)	0.0 (0.0)	0.0 (0.0)	0.0 (0.0)	0.0 (0.0)	0.0 (0.0)	0.2 (0.51)	0.9 (2.27)
Source: NOAA

== Arts and culture ==
=== Annual cultural events ===
The Yachats la de da Parade is held each July 4 at noon. It features anyone in town who wants to participate. Some of the regular entries include the Yachats Umbrella Drill Team, a belly dancing troupe, and a Yachats Fire Department truck accompanied by Dalmatian miniature goats. Starting in 2012, the Oregon Central Coast PFLAG (Parents and Friends of Lesbians and Gays) have also marched in the parade. For the past several years, the Yachats Youth and Family Activities Program (YYFAP) has run a (rubber) duck race in the Yachats estuary shortly following the parade. Then, in the evening, an extensive fireworks display is launched out over the ocean.

The Yachats Music Festival brings 20 to 30 of the world's major classical musicians for four concerts throughout a weekend in July. The Yachats event is the summer festival for Four Seasons Arts, an organization that presents annual recitals at Carnegie Hall and the Lincoln Center. This music festival has graced Yachats annually since 1981.

Each October, Yachats is the site of the Yachats Village Mushroom Festival. Some of the world's leading experts in mycology provide exhibits, give talks, and guide forest walks. There is also a culinary mushroom-growing workshop. Restaurants in Yachats participate in a Fungi Feast with wild mushroom cuisine. Mushroom-inspired art and music can be found at a number of venues around the town.

During the first weekend of November, the city hosts the Yachats Celtic Music Festival, with performances at several venues, including the auditorium of the Yachats Commons. Many of the world's finest Celtic musicians perform there, traveling from Scotland, Ireland, Canada, and various regions of the U.S. to participate. Workshops are held for teaching dances and the playing of instruments such as the bodhran and the tin whistle.

At the Cape Perpetua Scenic Area, the visitor center hosts Whale Watching Weeks in winter and in spring. About 400 gray whales feed along the coasts of Oregon, Washington, and British Columbia in the summer. Generally, whales are in the Cape Perpetua area from July through mid-November. These whales can be seen close to shore while feeding. The visitor center also sponsors a Tidepool Discovery Days program each summer and provides guided tidepool walks. The Heceta Head Lighthouse, located 13 miles (21 km) south of Yachats, holds a Victorian Christmas Open House each December. Besides the usual guided tours of the historic lighthouse, the Queen Anne style keeper's house is thoroughly decorated in a Victorian manner. Visitors are entertained with holiday musical performances and treats.

=== Museums and other points of interest ===
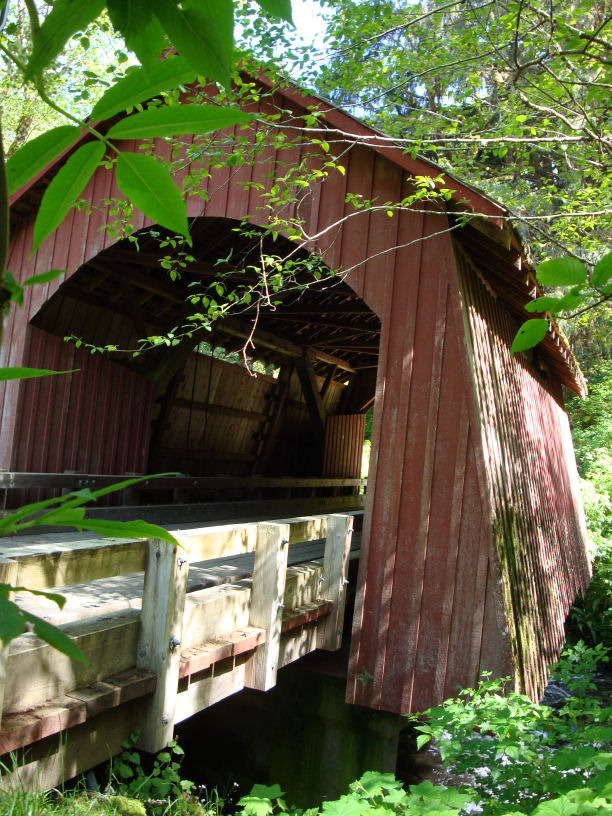
North Fork Yachats Covered Bridge

The Little Log Church and Museum, built in 1926, originally served as an Evangelical Church and later as a Presbyterian Church. Today it is owned and managed by the City of Yachats and houses a large collection of local historical artifacts. It is also a popular venue for weddings, memorials, concerts, and fine arts exhibits. Each Valentine's Day, a wedding vow renewal ceremony, open to any couple, is held there.

The North Fork of the Yachats Bridge is a covered bridge in the Yachats River Valley, about 9 miles (14 km) east of Yachats. It was completed, at a cost of $1,500, in 1938 and was the last bridge of veteran bridge builder Otis Hamer. A replica was constructed on the site in 1989, and again a replica was completely reconstructed in 2014 at a cost of over $750,000 from approximately two-thirds federal and one-third local tax dollars in the public interest of tourism. It features the queen-post truss style found in few covered bridges today and has ribbon openings under the roof to provide light to the bridge's center. Its span is 42 feet (13 m) long, making it one of the shortest covered bridges in the Pacific Northwest. Parking and turnaround past the bridge remains obstructed by an adjacent resident, due to ongoing protest of road legalization which established that area NW of the bridge as the current terminus of County Rd. 805.

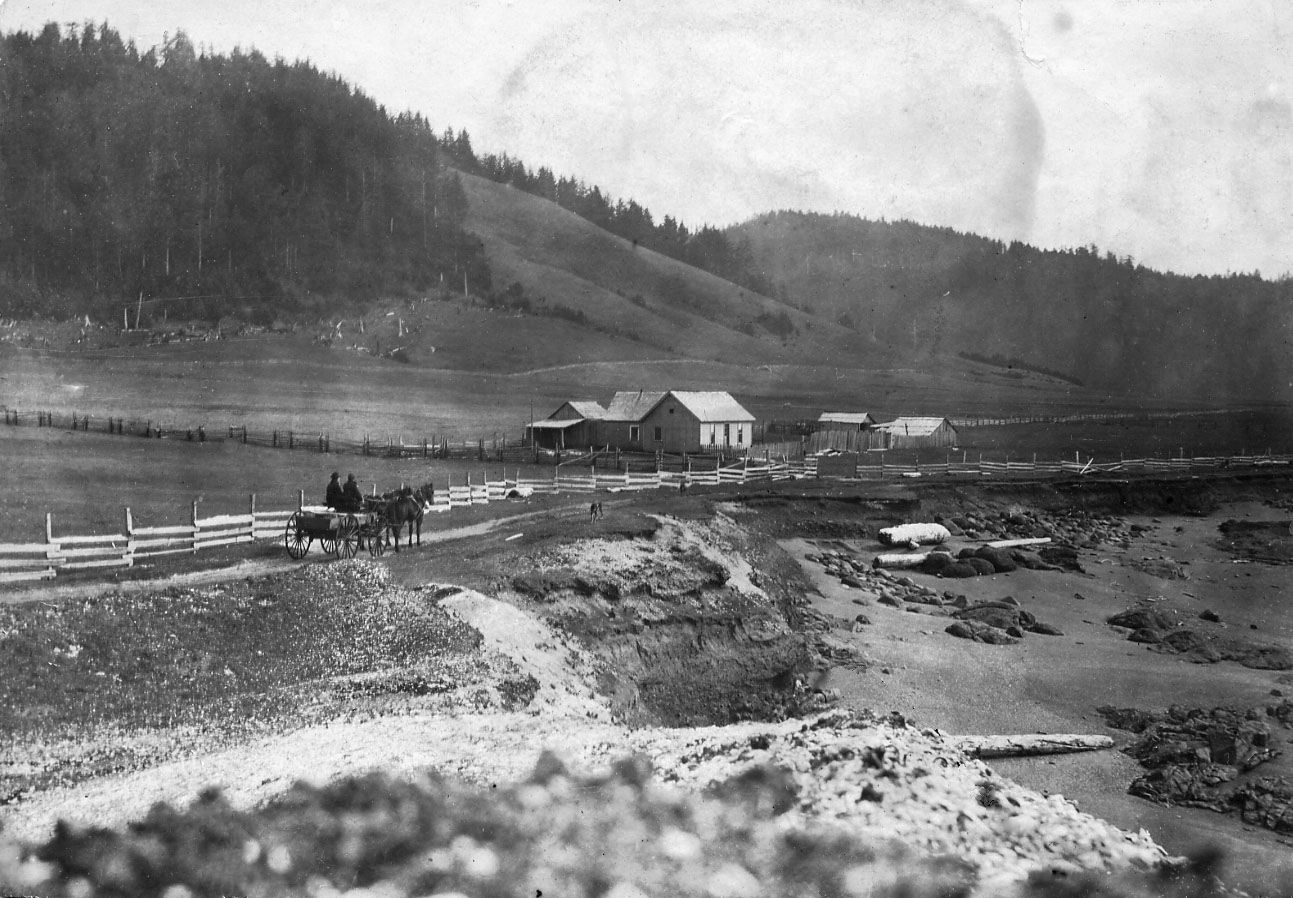
Yachats 804 Trail in 1892. Shell midden is in foreground, Horizon Hill is in background.

At one time, the Yachats 804 Trail was part of the major "thoroughfare" running between Yachats and Alsea Bay in Waldport, 8 miles (13 km) to the north. For many centuries it was used by Native Americans traveling between the bay and the Yachats River (but only during low tide). Later it was called County Road 804 when it was used for carriage and buggy traffic from the late 19th century until U.S. Highway 101 was built in the 1930s. The historic trail is a footpath that provides views of crashing surf, tidal pools, and native vegetation. Part of the Oregon Coast Trail system, it is maintained by the Oregon Parks and Recreation Department. It extends 0.75 miles (1.21 km) north from a public parking area in Smelt Sands State Recreation Area.

The sanctuary of the Yachats Community Presbyterian Church is lighted by six windows featuring gold-hued panes made of agates collected from the local beaches. The area of these windows totals 217 square feet (20 m^{2}). They are believed to be the world's only windows made of agate.

The Yachats Commons was built in the 1930s and used as a school until 1983. In 1990, the building was bought by the city to serve as a community center. It now houses the city government offices and hosts a wide variety of events, including monthly free movie nights, play readings and drum circles (open to the public), seniors' luncheons, and concerts of the Yachats Big Band (with ballroom dancing). Periodically, concerts by the Oregon Coast Chamber Orchestra and plays, musicals, and revues by One of Us Productions are performed on the stage in the large auditorium, and a number of art and craft shows are held at the Commons as well. From May through October the Commons is the site of the outdoor Yachats Farmers Market.

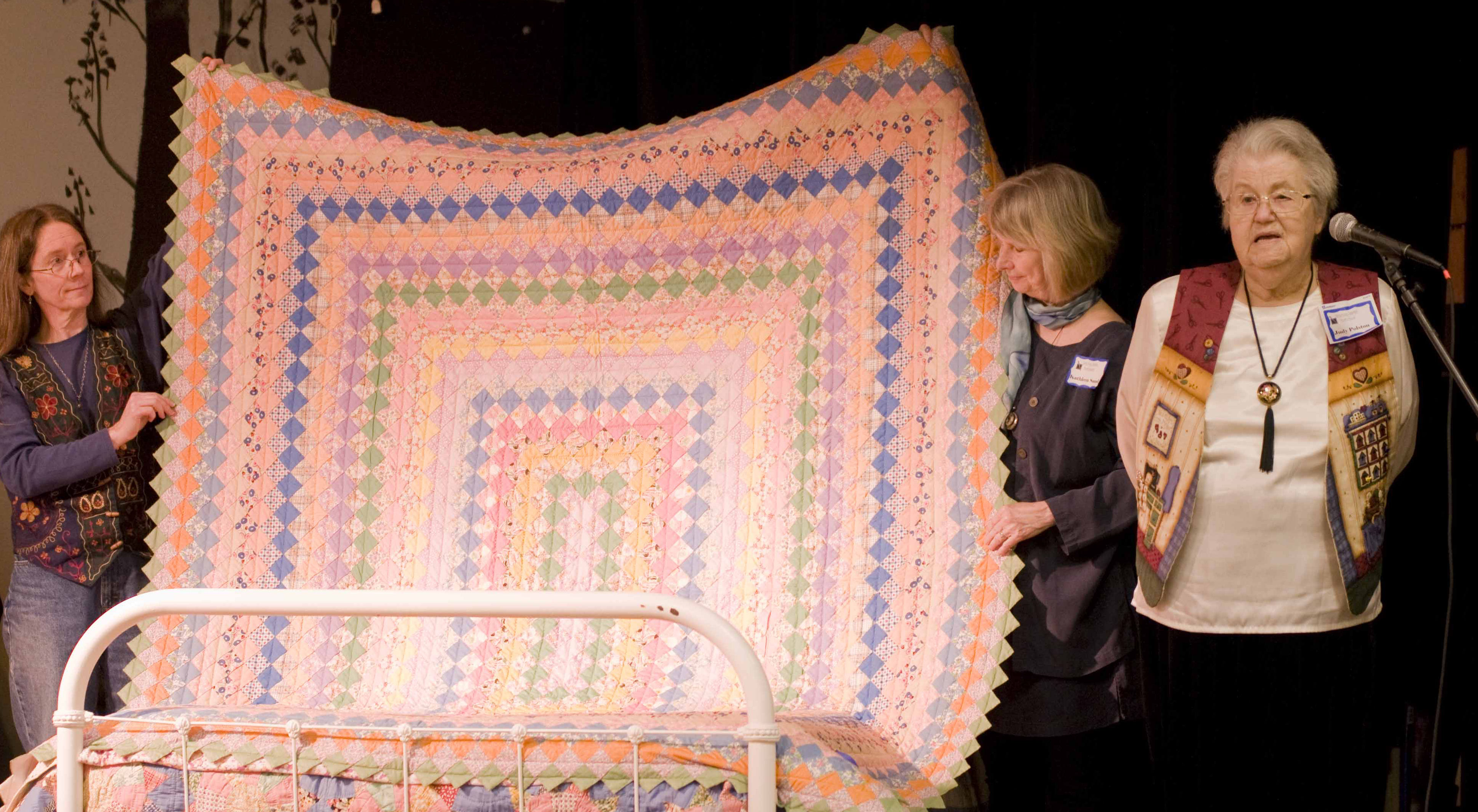
The Yachats Academy of Arts & Sciences sponsored "Stitching Stories," a regional quilt festival held in the Yachats Commons in 2011.

The Yachats Academy of Arts & Sciences sponsors numerous educational and entertainment events, most of which are held at the Commons. Presentations include speakers, films, workshops, exhibitions, and seminars on various topics relating to art, science and the humanities.

The Commons also serves as the venue for premieres of locally filmed movies. The Yachats International Film Festival is devoted to the filming and showing of such films as Ghoul from the Tidal Pool. A feature-length, tongue-in-cheek version of the 1950s horror movie genre, this film was made by an all-amateur production team of writers, actors, and crew. The star of the film is local youth Jordan Ostrum.

The Yachats Public Library hosts a perpetual exhibition of paintings, drawings, and photographs by the Yachats Arts Guild. The exhibited works are changed every few weeks. Also, the library houses the Yachats Seed Bank, a repository of vegetable seeds offered free to gardeners. The Seed Bank displays a wide selection of cookbooks, gardening manuals, and guides for developing community sustainability. In addition, the library provides high speed Internet access over its Wi-Fi connection. Computers are available to the public during regular hours. Library cards are free and visitors can check out books while they vacation in Yachats.

== Parks and recreation ==
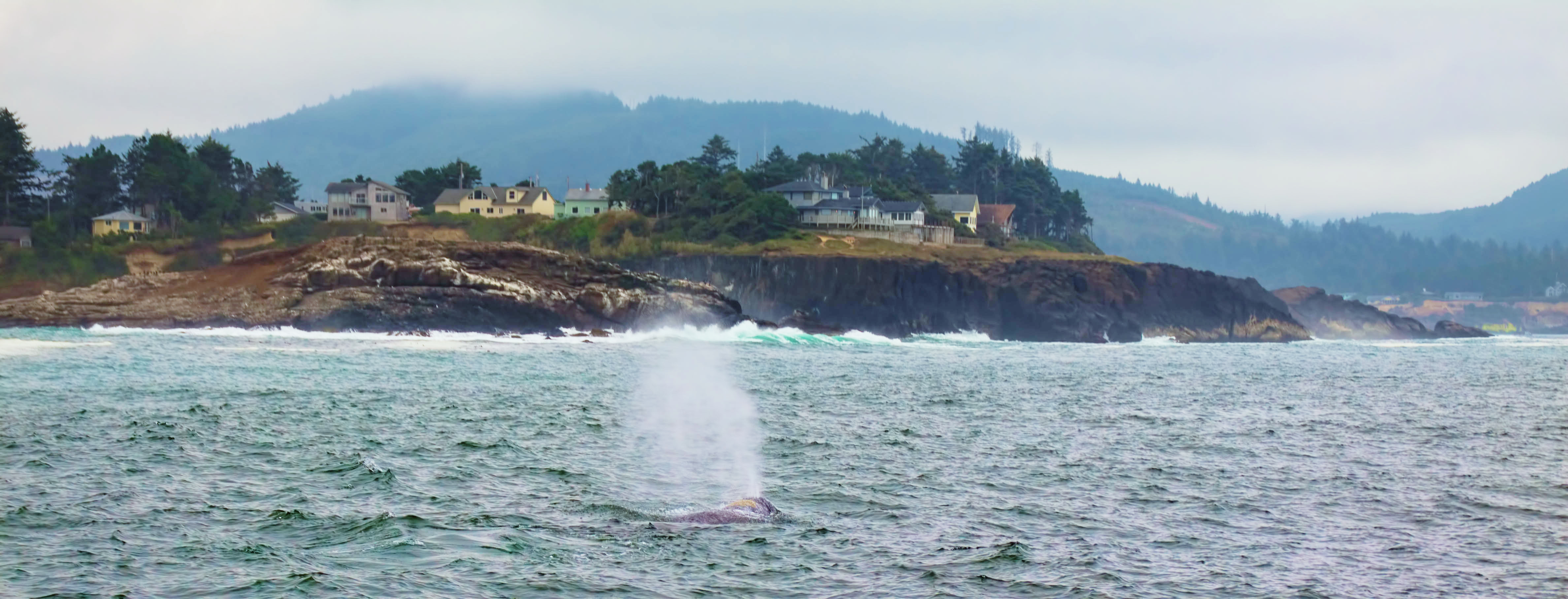
A gray whale swims offshore near Yachats.

The Yachats area is home to a rich variety of plant and animal life. Its natural history affords the study of marine, montane, and riparian ecological communities and their complex interactions. The following natural attractions are dedicated to the protection, study, and exposition of the plants and wildlife of the central Oregon coast.

The Siuslaw National Forest borders Yachats on the east and consists of over 630,000 acres or 2,500 square kilometers (about five-eighths the area of the state of Rhode Island) extending from Coos Bay in the south to Tillamook in the north. The forest has numerous hiking trails, including those through the virgin stands of Sitka spruce, western hemlock, and Douglas fir in the Cummins Creek and Rock Creek Wilderness areas a few miles south of Yachats. Another network of hiking trails north of Yachats leads to summits such as those of Cannibal Mountain and Burnt Timber Mountain.

The Siuslaw National Forest features Cape Perpetua, located about 2 miles (3 km) south of Yachats. Named by Captain James Cook on March 7, 1778, this promontory rises to 803 feet (245 m) above sea level, making it the highest point on the Oregon coast. Its West Shelter observation point is a popular site for watching migrating gray whales. At the foot of the cape, the power of the waves has carved a rugged inlet called the Devil's Churn. Around on the north slope of the cape, the privately owned and operated Cleft of the Rock Lighthouse is visible from the U.S. 101 Highway.

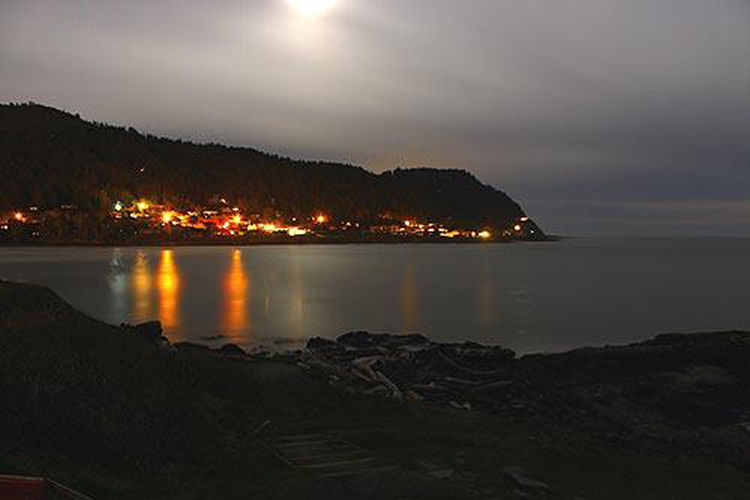
The lights of Yachats as seen from across the estuary

Yachats Ocean Road State Natural Site is located on the south side of the mouth of the Yachats River. It forms a 1-mile-long (1.6 km) strip on the bank overlooking the river's estuary and the ocean. Picnic tables are available and a stairway leads down to the beach on the north end of the park. At Agate Cove on the south end of the park, waves crashing against the basalt rocks provide spectacular spouts from blow holes.

Yachats State Recreation Area is a day use only park located on the north side of the mouth of the Yachats River. It includes a viewing deck jutting out from the headlands 0.25 miles (0.40 km) west of downtown Yachats. It offers viewing of whales and other wildlife, tide pools, kite flying, fishing, and picnicking. Restrooms are available.

Smelt Sands State Recreation Site is a beach located on the northern edge of Yachats. At one time large numbers of smelt (a small relative of the salmon) came ashore here during annual runs. These runs have diminished in recent years. The beach can be reached by walking the historic 804 Trail, 0.75 miles (1.21 km) each way, from the parking area to the south end of the park. In January 2013, the Coastal Safety Marker was installed in Smelt Sands State Park to remind visitors about the danger of sneaker waves. The marker tells the story of two high school seniors from Eugene, Oregon, who were hit by a sneaker wave and drowned here on February 5, 2011.

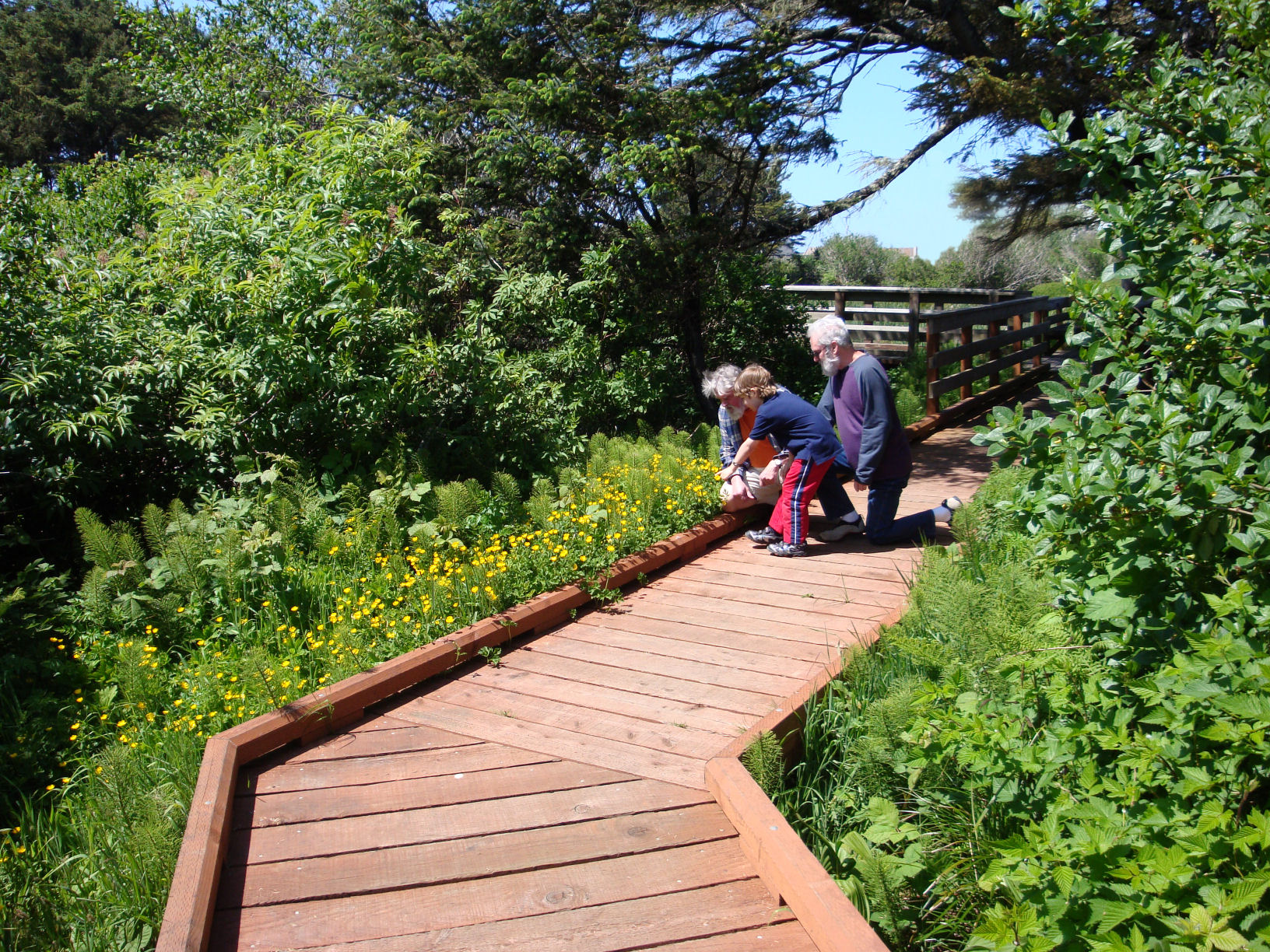
Boardwalk over wetlands in the Yachats Community Park

Yachats Community Park is a restored marshland in the city's center. The park's boardwalks and paths present a wide variety of native plants and wildlife, including a preserved spruce forest. Migrating waterfowl visit the wetlands regularly, and ospreys nest on platforms provided especially for them. The park includes a picnic shelter, peace garden, tree house, and benches.

Gerdemann Botanical Preserve is a 3.5-acre (1.4 ha) native woodland on the northern edge of Yachats and the western edge of the Siuslaw National Forest. The garden contains and preserves the botanical collection of horticulturalists James and Janice Gerdemann. Among the native Sitka spruce, western hemlock and wildflowers, the garden is a unique experimental outdoor laboratory, featuring a great many exotic species such as South African honeybush, New Zealand and Tasmanian tree ferns, Chinese fig hazel, Australian Grevillia, and Chilean flame and lantern trees. Today the garden is dedicated to botanical research and education.

Ten Mile Creek Sanctuary is a 216-acre (0.87 km^{2}) reserve 7 miles (11 km) south of Yachats. This protected stand of Sitka spruce and western hemlock is home to the federally listed species of marbled murrelet and northern spotted owl as well as other species such as the Roosevelt elk, black-tailed deer, cougar, black bear, and bald eagle. Ten Mile Creek has runs of steelhead trout, Chinook salmon, and threatened coho salmon. The sanctuary is under the management of the Audubon Society, and offers extensive educational programs in addition to its conservation efforts.

== Government ==
Yachats has a council–manager form of government, including a mayor and four councilors. The positions are non-partisan and unpaid; the mayor serves a two-year term and the councilors serve four-year terms. The city has four commissions: The Planning Commission, The Public Works and Streets Commission, The Library Commission, and The Parks and Commons Commission.

== Education ==
Yachats is served by the Lincoln County School District. Kindergarten through eighth grade students attend Crestview Heights School in Waldport, and ninth through twelfth grade students attend Waldport High School. The closest colleges are Oregon Coast Community College in Newport (with a branch in Waldport) and Lane Community College in Florence.

== Media ==
Published monthly, The Yachats Gazette provides hardcopy and online community news, including interviews and features about local people, businesses and attractions. Two other publications cover the Yachats area: the South Lincoln County News and the Newport News-Times. No radio or television stations are located in the Yachats area.

== Infrastructure ==
Yachats is on U.S. Route 101. Renovation of Highway 101 shoulders in 2017 has caused some problems, and due to pedestrian ability to stop traffic at will some local residents have dubbed Yachats "the biggest little traffic jam on the Oregon coast." The closest airport is Wakonda Beach State Airport R33, a 2,000 ft × 30 ft (610 m × 9 m) grass airstrip near Waldport. Yachats has no rail service, but local bus transportation is provided by Lincoln County Transit.

The City of Yachats provides water and sewer services. Drinking water comes from Salmon and Reedy creeks. Electricity is provided by Central Lincoln Public Utility District and telephone service by Pioneer Telephone Cooperative. Solid waste disposal and cable are provided by private businesses.

The closest hospitals are Samaritan Pacific Communities Hospital in Newport and Peace Harbor Hospital in Florence. Health care is available in Waldport at Waldport Family Medical Center, Samaritan (Waldport) Clinic, and Waldport Physical Therapy and Sports Medicine.

Yachats Rural Fire District has three fire stations. Law enforcement is provided by the Lincoln County Sheriff's Department and the Oregon State Police.

== See also ==
- Cleft of the Rock Lighthouse
