= Cape Perpetua =

Headland on the coast of Oregon, US

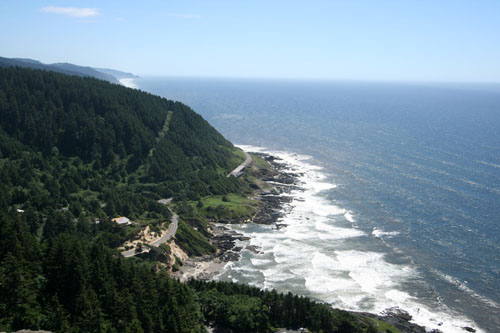
- Cape Perpetua Whispering Spruce view

- Location within Oregon
- Location: Lincoln County, Oregon, USA
- Nearest city: Yachats, Oregon
- Coordinates: 44.2872°N 124.114°W
- Governing body: United States Forest Service

Cape Perpetua is a large forested headland projecting into the Pacific Ocean on the central Oregon Coast in Lincoln County, Oregon. The land is managed by the United States Forest Service as part of the Siuslaw National Forest.

== Location ==
Cape Perpetua is located about 2 miles (3.2 km) south of Yachats, Oregon, along U.S. Route 101. It is a typical Pacific Northwest headland, forming a high steep bluff above the ocean. At its highest point, Cape Perpetua rises to over 800 feet (244 m) above sea level. From its crest, an observer can see 70 miles (113 km) of Oregon coastline and as far as 37 miles (60 km) out to sea on a clear day.

== History ==
- Cape Perpetua Shelter and Parapet
- U.S. National Register of Historic Places
- U.S. Historic district
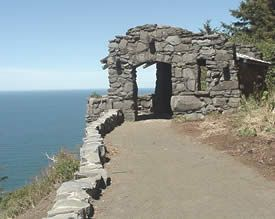
- West Shelter observation point

- Location within Oregon Location within the United States
- Nearest city: Yachats, Oregon
- Built: 1933
- Architect: Civilian Conservation Corps; United States Forest Service
- NRHP reference No.: 88002016
- Added to NRHP: March 17, 1989

For at least 6,000 years, Native Americans hunted for mussels, crabs, sea urchins, and clams along the coast near Cape Perpetua. Cape Perpetua was part of the southern territory of the Alsea people. In their language the Cape was named Halqaik, which might mean something like 'exposed place'. Evidence of their lives can still be found in the huge piles of discarded mussel shells that lie along the shore near the Cape Perpetua Visitor Center.

The cape was named by Captain James Cook on March 7, 1778, as he searched for the Pacific entrance to a Northwest Passage. Cook named the cape Perpetua because it was discovered on St. Perpetua's Day.

The area became part of the Siuslaw National Forest in 1908. In 1914, the United States Forest Service cut a narrow road into the cliff around Cape Perpetua and constructed a wooden bridge across the Yachats River, opening travel between the small community of Yachats and Florence to the south. The wooden bridge was replaced in 1926 with a steel structure. The Cape Perpetua section of the Roosevelt Memorial Highway (now Highway 101) was built in the 1930s.

In 1933, a Civilian Conservation Corps (CCC) camp was built at the foot of the cape just north of Cape Creek, near where the Cape Perpetua Visitor Center is located today. The CCC constructed the Cape Perpetua campground, a network of trails, and the West Shelter observation point near the top of the cape. During World War II, the West Shelter observation point was used as a coastal watch station, and a large coastal defense gun was temporarily installed. An SCR-270B radar was installed at an undetermined location to take advantage of the height of the promontory.

The Cape Perpetua Shelter and Parapet were listed on the National Register of Historic Places in 1989.

== Cape Perpetua Scenic Area ==
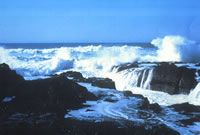
Devil's Churn near Cape Perpetua

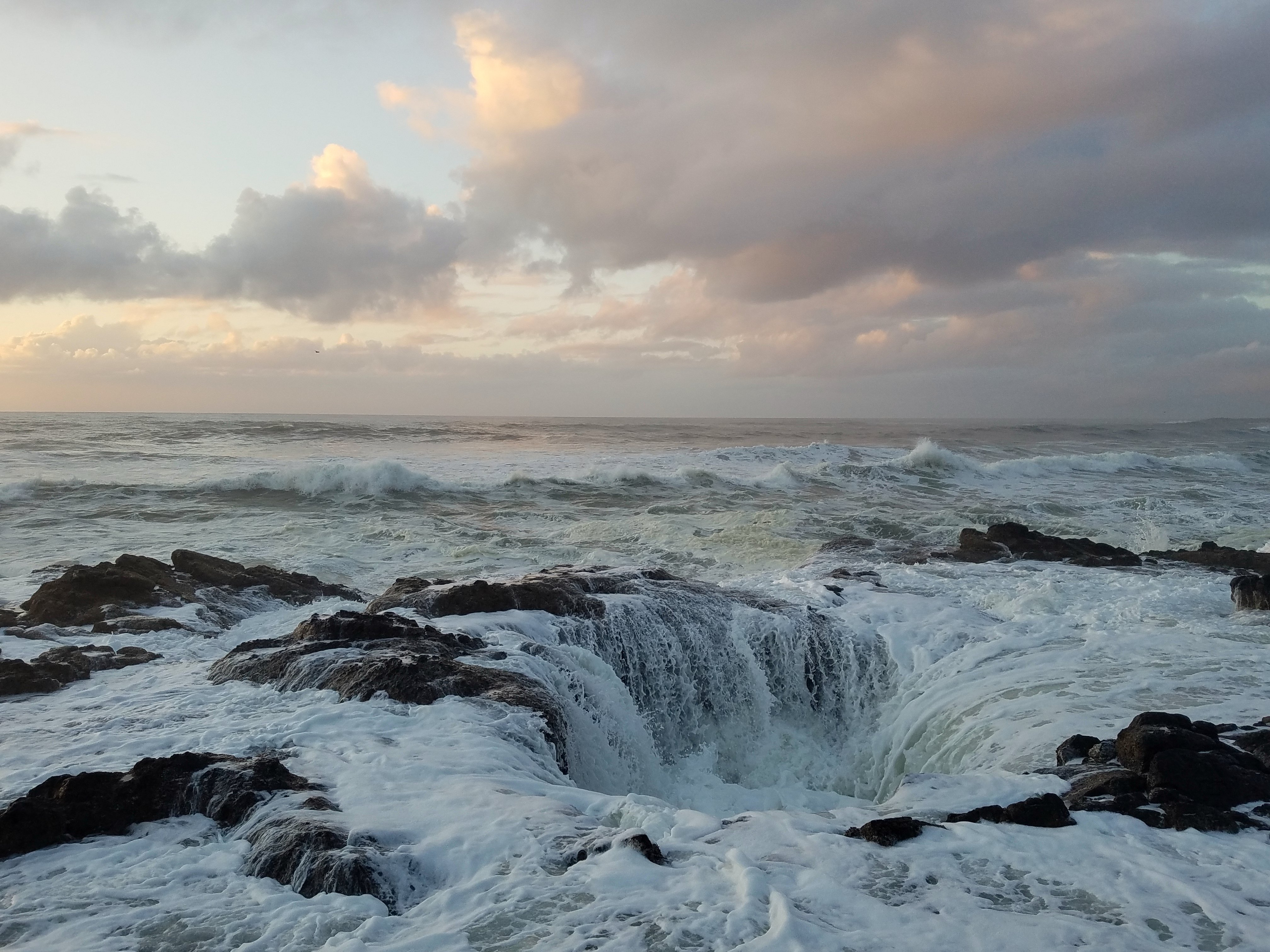
Thor's Well

The Forest Service created the Cape Perpetua Scenic Area and built the Cape Perpetua Visitor Center in the 1960s to highlight the unique beauty of the central Oregon Coast. The scenic area includes 2,700 acres (1,100 ha) of old growth spruce, Douglas fir, and western hemlock.

Camping, picnicking, hiking, sightseeing, whale watching, and a visitor center with daily programs are all available within the Cape Perpetua Scenic Area. There are 26 miles (42 km) of interconnected hiking trails in old growth forests that lead to Pacific Ocean tide pools. One of the trails leads to a 600-year-old giant Sitka spruce known as the Silent Sentinel of the Siuslaw. This tree stands more than 185 feet (56 m) high, and has a 40-foot (12 m) circumference at its base. On September 15, 2007, this ancient spruce was designated an Oregon Heritage Tree by the State of Oregon to recognize its exceptional age and size and ensure its protection.

Along the Cape Perpetua coastline, there are several unique features as well. The Devils Churn is a long crack in the coastal rock that fills with each ocean wave, occasionally exploding as incoming and outgoing waves collide. The Spouting Horn at Cook's Chasm and Thor's Well on the plateau nearby are both salt water fountains driven by the power of the ocean tide. Thor's Well is at 44.278421°N 124.113499°W. Spouting Horn is at 44.277497°N 124.112994°W. Both Thor's Well and Spouting Horn are best seen approximately an hour before high tide to an hour after high tide. How spectacular the sights are is a function of the height of the high tide and the direction and size of the swells. The wind can also be a factor. Devil's Churn, Spouting Horn and Thor's Well are popular with visitors; however, all three can be dangerous, especially at high tide and during winter storms.

The Cape Perpetua Visitor Center is located two miles (3 km) south of Yachats. The visitor center has views of the ocean and coast from its deck. It is also used to watch migrating gray whales. The visitor center has natural history and cultural exhibits, an interactive children's science area, a theater with nature films, and a bookstore. An SCR-270B radar was installed on the site in 1943 in response to the bombing of Mt. Emily, Brookings, Oregon.

== See also ==
- Heceta Bank, offshore
- Siletz Reef
