= Yachats River =

Coordinates: 44.30836°N 124.10772°W

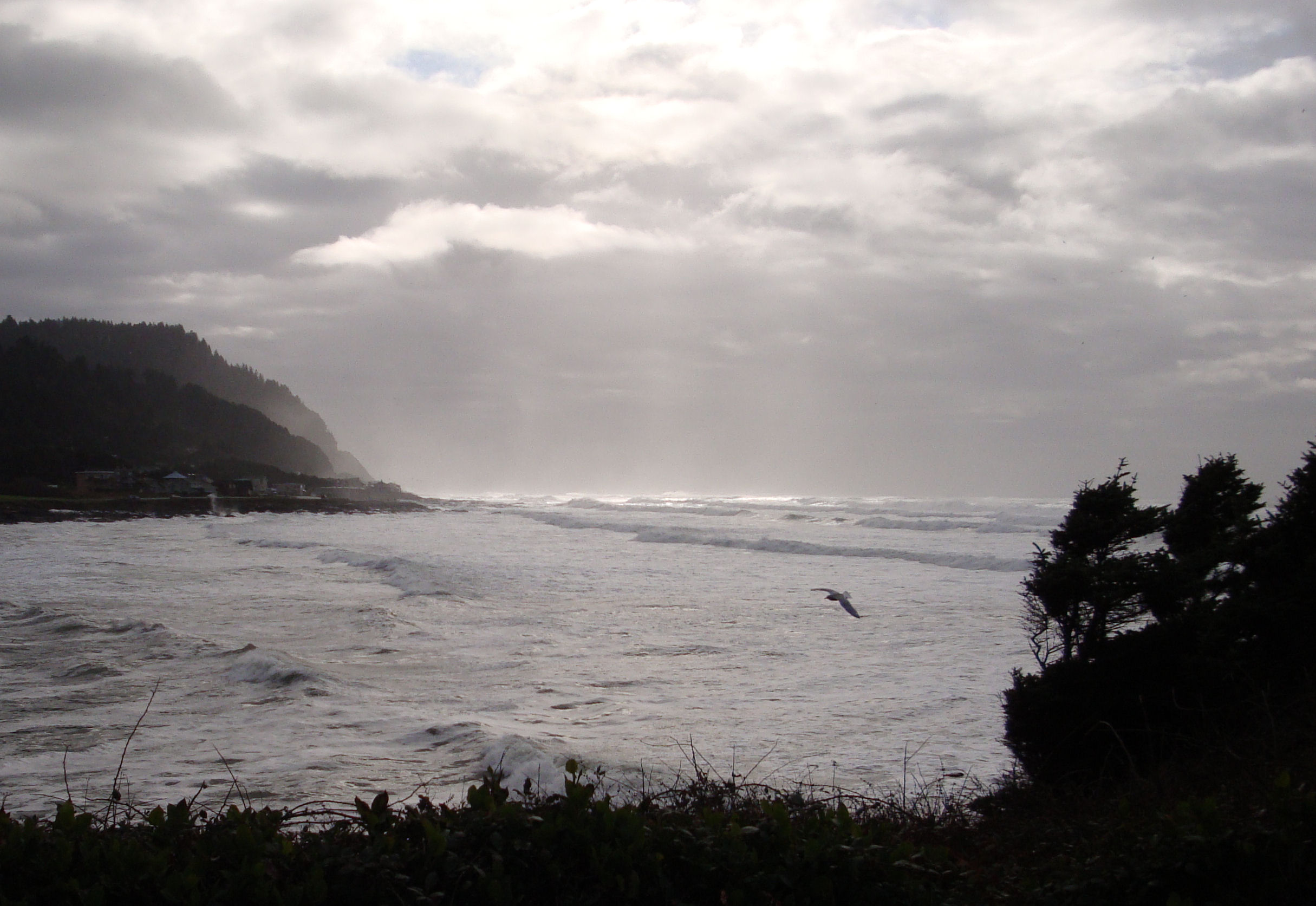
- Mouth of the Yachats River

Location
- Country: United States

Physical characteristics
- Source
  - location: Central Oregon Coast Range
  - elevation: 1,200 ft (370 m)
- Mouth
  - location: Pacific Ocean
  - elevation: sea level
- Length: 15 mi (24 km)
- Basin size: 44 sq mi (110 km^{2})
- Discharge
  - average: December: 350 cu ft/s (9.9 m^{3}/s); September: 19 cu ft/s (0.54 m^{3}/s)

The Yachats River (/ˈjɑːhɑːts/ YAH-hahts) is a short river on the central Oregon coast, about 60 miles (100 km) west-north-west of Eugene. The name is the native name meaning at the foot of the mountain.

The river begins about 12 miles (19 km) east-south-east of Yachats, Oregon, in steep, thick forest, a half mile north of Klickitat Mountain and flows northward about three miles (5 km), joins Grass Creek then about 0.4 miles (640 m) later joins with School Fork and turns westward. Keller Creek and Stump Creek join after about a mile (1.6 km) of meandering, followed after a half mile (800 m) by Neiglick Creek at river mile 10 (river kilometer 16). The river bed widens significantly and levels out to become very slow moving and turns northward about a half mile, then westward at river mile 8 (river kilometer 13). It meanders westward the rest of the way to the ocean. The sand and stone beach at the river bar is normally very shallow, which allows the tide to change the length of the river as much as a mile.

Named tributaries from source to mouth are Grass Creek, School Fork, then Keller, Stump, and Neiglick creeks followed by the North Fork Yachats River. Below that come Axtell, Helms, Werner, Bend, Clear, Carlson, Dawson, Beamer, South Beamer, Marks, Reedy, and Salmon creeks.

== Gallery ==
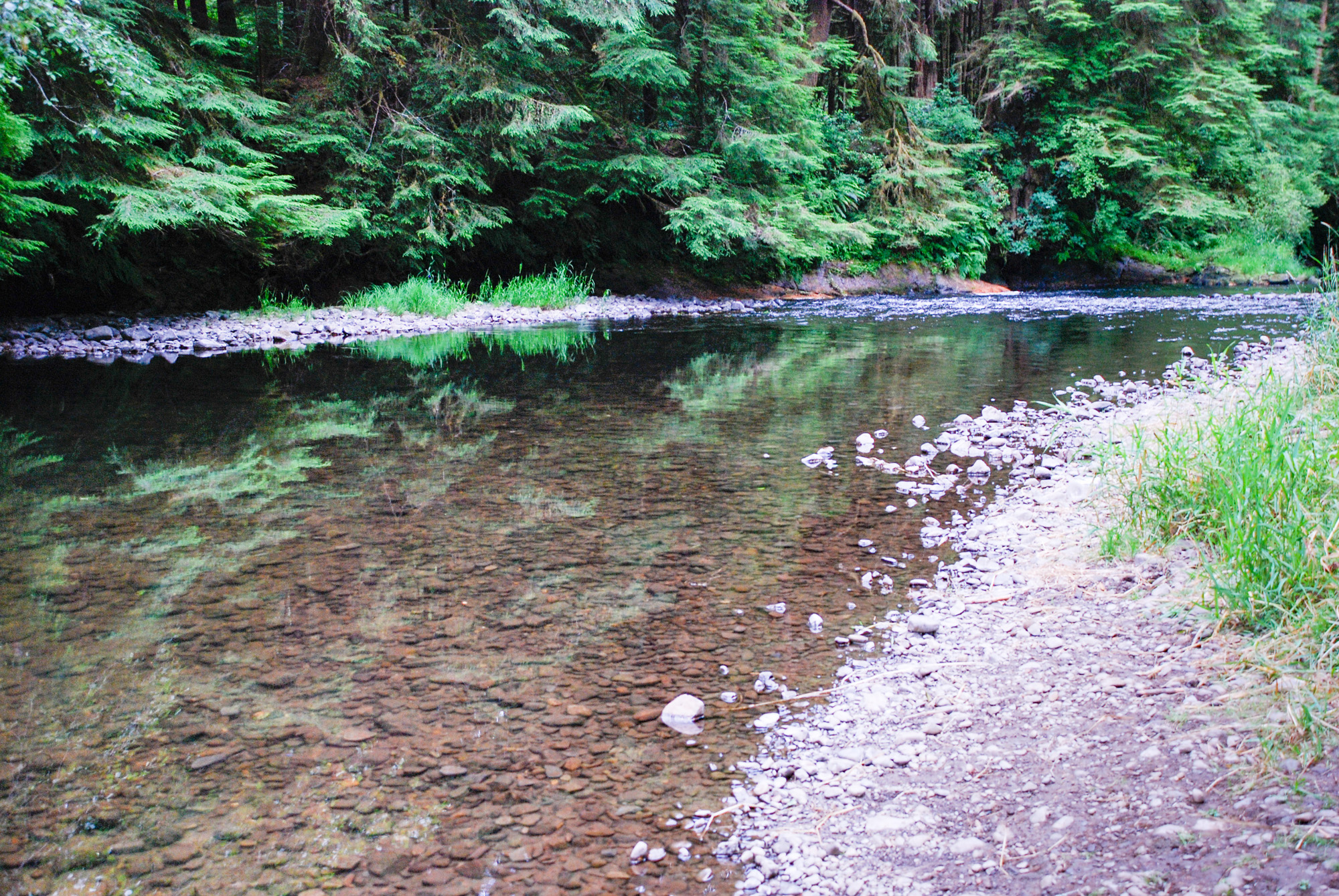
Yachats River, July 2010.

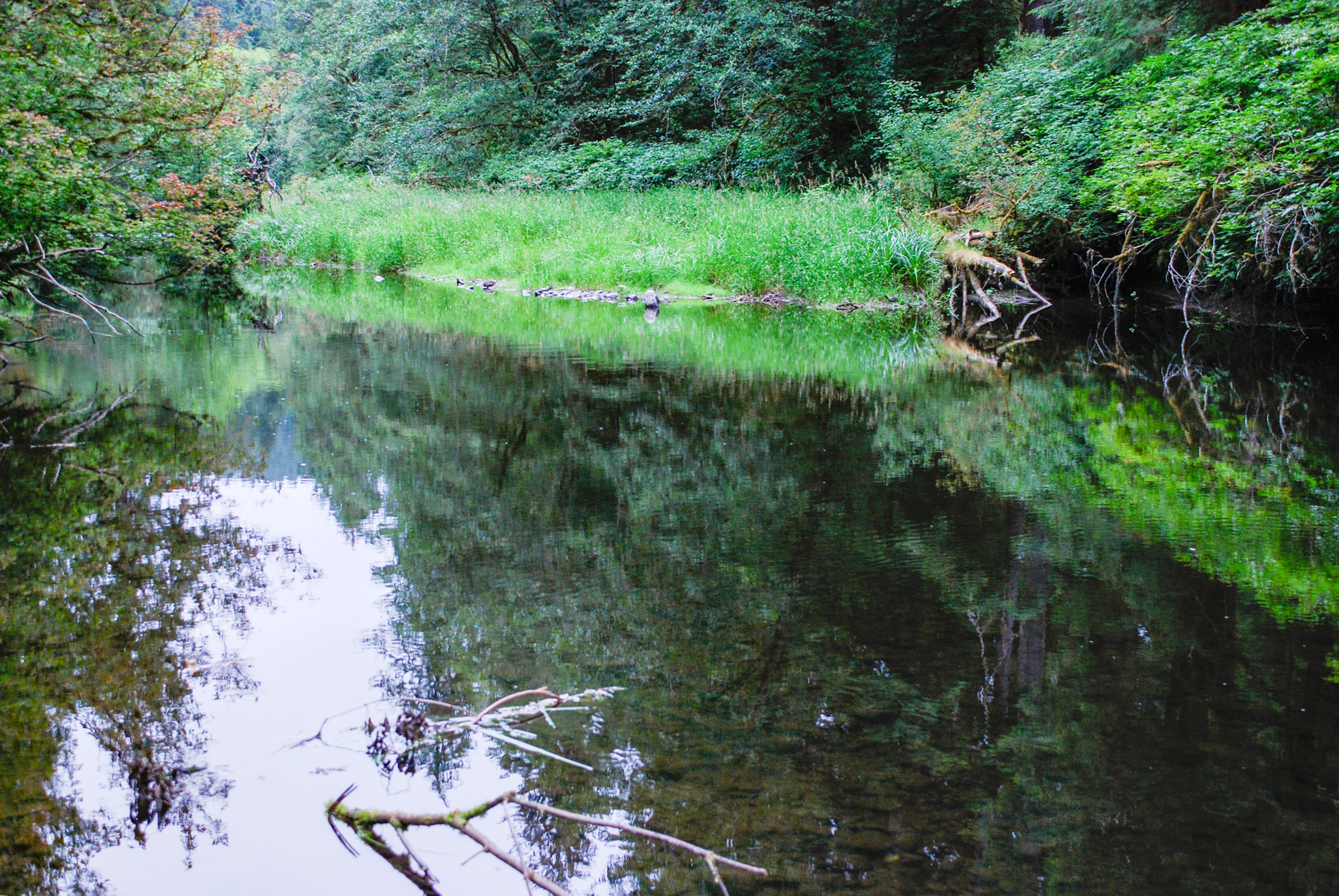
Yachats River, July 2010.

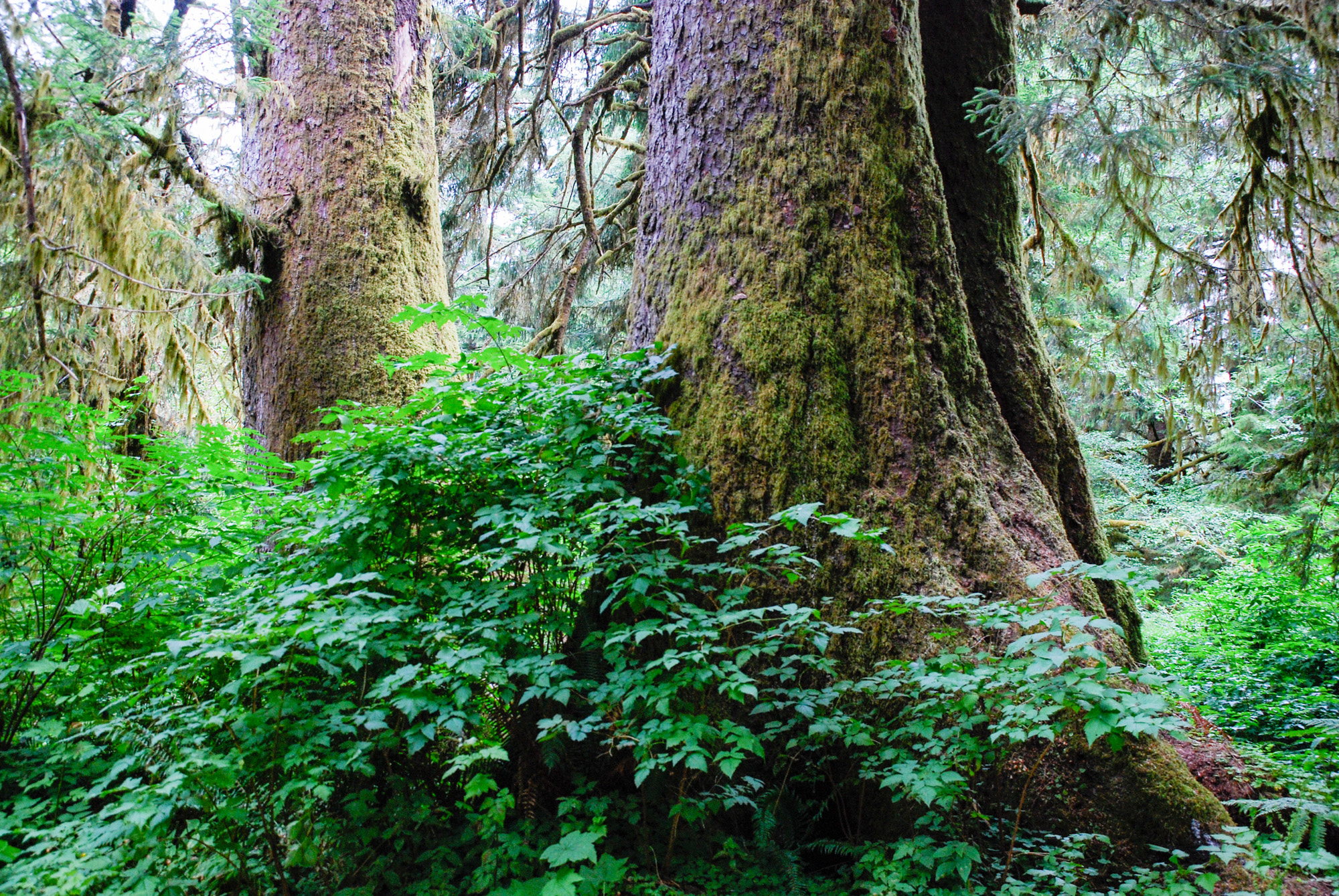
Sitka spruce on Yachats River Road.

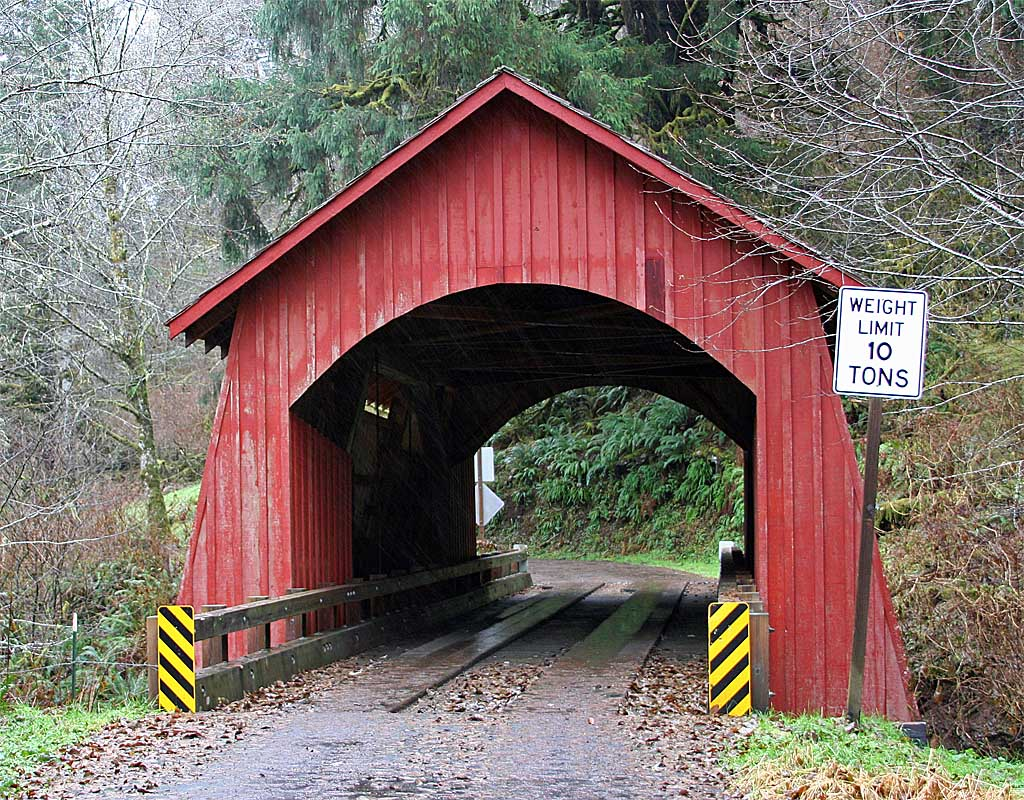
North fork Yachats River

== See also ==
- List of Oregon rivers
