= Coquille (steamboat) =

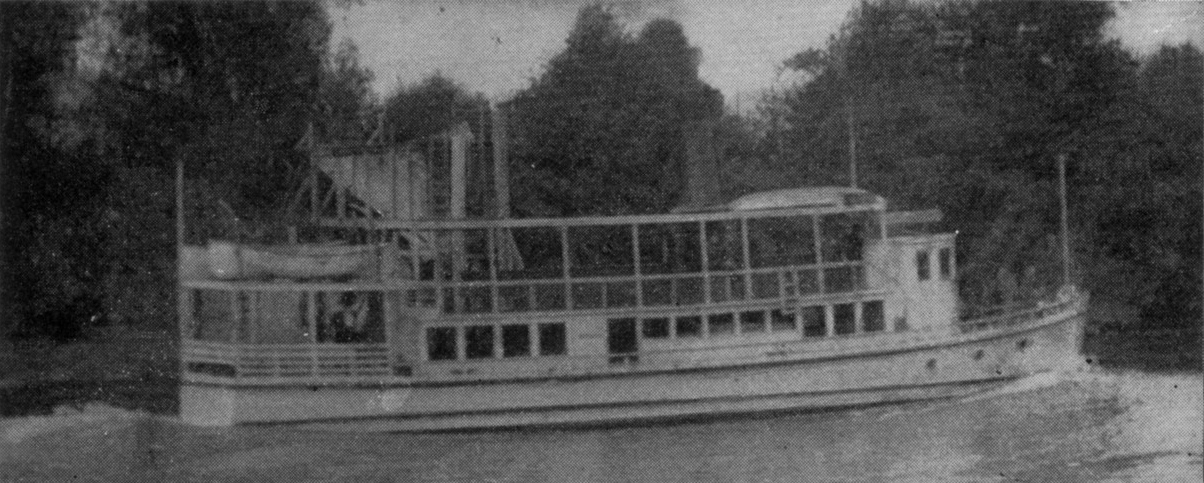
- Coquille as built.

History
- Name: Coquille
- Port of registry: Coos Bay, OR, later Astoria, OR
- Builder: Frank Lowe, Coquille, Oregon
- Launched: October 10, 1908
- In service: 1908
- Identification: U.S. 205472
- Notes: Converted to a towing boat for log rafts in 1916.

General characteristics
- Type: Inland passenger-freight, later, towing
- Tonnage: As built: 63 gross, 46 net tons, varied later.
- Length: 76.7 ft (23.38 m)
- Beam: 15.7 ft (4.79 m)
- Depth of hold: 7.9 ft (2.41 m)
- Decks: as built: one, altered later.
- Installed power: steam engine
- Propulsion: propeller
- Notes: Converted to towboat in 1916.

Coquille was a steamboat built in 1908 for service on the Coquille River and its tributaries. Coquille served as a passenger vessel from 1908 to 1916, when the boat was transferred to the lower Columbia River. Coquille was reconstructed into a log boom towing boat, and served in this capacity from 1916 to 1935 or later.

== Initial construction ==
Coquille was built by Frank Lowe at Coquille, Oregon in 1908 for the Coquille River Navigation Company for passenger service on the Coquille River. The vessel was steam-powered and propeller-driven. The hull was built from Port Orford cedar. On completion, the overall size of the vessel was 63 gross and 46 net tons. Coquille was 76.7 ft (23.38 m) long, with a beam of 15.7 ft (4.79 m) and 7.9 ft (2.41 m) depth of hold. The official steamboat registry number was 205472.

Coquille was launched on October 10, 1908.

== Reconstruction ==
Coquille was rebuilt several times. With the addition of new machinery and an upper cabin in 1912 or 1913, the boat was measured at 77 gross and 60 net tons. While still in passenger service, Coquille was reconstructed again, and reduced somewhat in size, to 62 gross and 46 net tons. Coquille was reconstructed a third time, in 1916, when the vessel was converted to towing service.

== Collision with Wolverine ==
On September 16, 1909, a rival boat, the motor vessel Wolverine collided with Coquille, at Johnson's Mill. No damage was sustained by either vessel.

On October 18, 1909, it was reported that two steamboat inspectors and a secretary had departed Portland, Oregon bound by steamer to Coos Bay to investigate first the collision of the ocean-going steamer Breakwater with the riverine steamer Alert, and second, the charges that had been brought by Orsan R. Willard, owner of Wolverine against T.R. Panter, owner of the river steamer Coquille to the effect that while Wolverine had been docked, Coquille had been deliberately rammed into the launch. The hearing on the Willard accusation was scheduled to be held on October 23, 1909, in Coquille, Oregon.

On October 28, 1909, the Steamboat Inspection Service announced its decision. The license of Orsan R. Willard, master of Wolverine would be suspended for 30 days, and the license of Thomas W. Panter, master of Coquille, would be suspended for 60 days.

== Second deck added ==
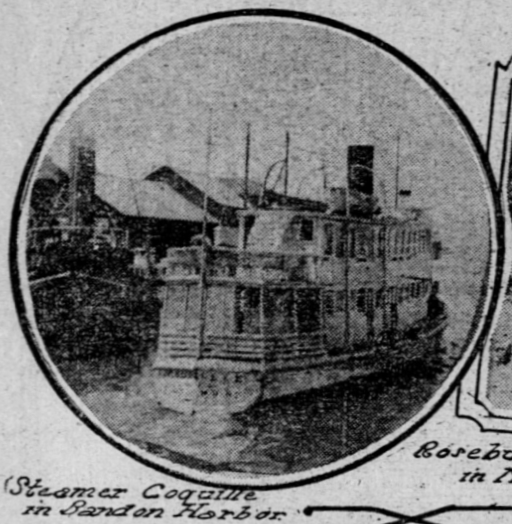
Coquille in 1913, with upper cabin added.

Coquille was intended to be the fastest vessel on the Coquille river, but this did not prove to be the case. As built, Coquille had a single cabin. In 1912 or 1913 a second, upper, cabin was added to Coquille. Unfortunately this made the vessel top-heavy, so that when the steamer came around the sharp bend in the river near Prosper, all passengers had to move to the lower cabin to stabilize the boat.

The upper deck was added under the direction of Hank Dunham, who also had a more powerful engine installed at the same time. The engine was new, and had been built in Portland, Oregon. This made the vessel top-heavy, so that "in anything like a wind swayed so that people were afraid to ride on her." This occasioned a second reconstruction, which occurred sometime before the sale of the vessel to Portland interests in January 1916. These changes were reported to have been satisfactory.

== Child overboard ==
On December 23, 1912, it was reported that a child, a young girl, had fallen overboard near the Lyons and Johnson mill at Bandon. The child was not missed on the steamer for 15 minutes. She was found and rescued by the mill's engineer, who heard her crying and found her floating on her back in the deep water under the mill wharf.

In January 1913, there were four vessels operating on the Coquille River which transported both passengers and freight. Of these, two ran from Bandon to Myrtle Point and the other two covered only the route from Bandon to Coquille. In addition to these four vessels, there were two passenger only boats operating on the river between Bandon and Coquille, the steamer Coquille and the motor vessel Wolverine.

In January 1913, Coquille made two round trips daily between Bandon and Coquille City, and had been doing so since June 1, 1912. The steamer left Bandon at 6:00 a.m. and 1:00 p.m. and arrived in Coquille at 9:30 a.m. and 3:30 p.m. From June 1, 1912, to January 1, 1913, Coquille had carried about 21,000 passengers, which worked out to about 100 passengers per day. The steamer was reported to have Morris chairs for passengers, electric lighting and "many other conveniences of modern river travel."

== "Deportation" of IWW sympathizer ==
On the afternoon of July 11, 1913, the citizens of Bandon "deported" a newspaper editor, Dr. Bailey K. Leach, a chiropractor, because he had published editorials sympathetic to the Industrial Workers of the World, who were rumored to be planning to "invade" Bandon, by placing Dr. Leach on board Coquille, bound for Coquille City, with orders never to return. Dr. Leach was reported to have been "accompanied by a committee of Bandon businessmen" while on board Coquille. In addition, the steamer Favorite, "loaded with businessmen" accompanied Coquille on the journey upriver. According to the UPI story, "[t]here were no sympathizers to object to the deportation of Dr. Leach, and he was a sorry figure, alone and friendless. Practically the entire citizenship was present to witness his departure ..."

== Sinking ==
On February 18, 1914, Coquille was reported to be back in service after having been recently raised. Following rebuilding at Prosper, Coquille was reported to be making better speed.

== Transfer to Myrtle Point Transportation Company ==
On November 20, 1915, the owners of Coquille, the Coquille River Transportation Company sold out all their interests in the river transport business to their chief competitor, the Myrtle Point Transportation Company, which was composed primarily of the numerous Panter family. At this time, the stock of the Coquille River Transportation Company was held by C.W. Ashton and E.W. Schetter, with O.R. "Ott" Willard having sold his interests the previous summer.

With the purchase of Coquille, and the Coquille River Transportation company's other boat, the motor vessel Charm, Russell Panter and the Panter family now controlled eight vessels on the river. The other Panter boats were the gasoline launches Pronto, Norma and Maple, and the sternwheelers Telegraph, Dora, and Myrtle.

The new owners now controlled all river transport on the Coquille except for two remaining opposition boat, Dispatch and Favorite, both owned by the Farmers Transportation Company.

A new schedule was put out, with Coquille leaving Coquille at 7:00 a.m., and, on the return trip, departing Bandon at 2:00 p.m., making one round-trip per day. Stacy Panter would be the new pilot and Carl Donaldson would be the new engineer.

== Transfer to Columbia River ==
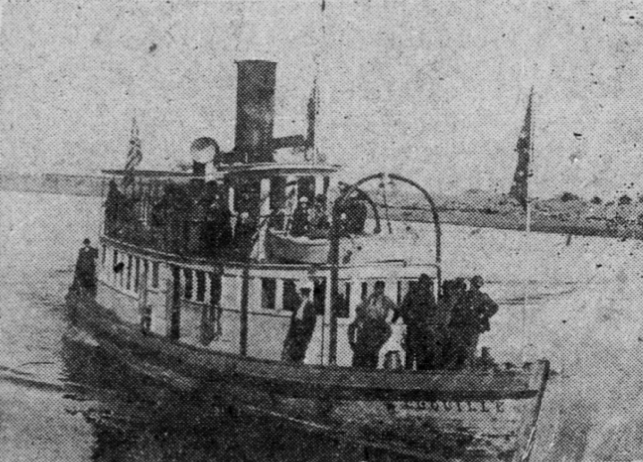
Coquille in 1916, prior to reconstruction as towboat.

On January 25, 1916, it was reported that the previous week a sale of the Coquille to the Shaver Transportation Company, a Columbia River towing concern, had been concluded. The vessel would be transferred as soon as weather permitted. Shaver at that time was a large concern with a dozen or more boats in operation.

The new owners intended to place Coquille in service on the Willamette River. At this time, the overall size of the vessel was 62 gross and 46 net tons, with a length of 76.7 ft (23.38 m), beam of 15.7 ft (4.79 m) and depth of hold of 7.5 ft (2.29 m).

The sale occurred after Capt. J.W. Shaver, of Shaver Transportation, travelled to the Coquille River to inspect the vessel. Myrtle Point Transportation Company agreed on the sale price, and further agreed to transfer the vessel to the Columbia.

Favorable weather for the transfer came about the next month. On February 17, 1916, Coquille departed Bandon at 9:50 am., passed by Coos Bay en route to the Columbia River. Coquille arrived at Astoria on February 19, 1916. The vessel was intended to be placed into towing service.

Shaver planned to reconstruct Coquille for towing by, among other things, eliminating the passenger accommodations, cutting away the after section of the vessel's deckhouse, leaving one stateroom on each side, and lowering the smokestack to allow the boat to pass under bridges. Coquille burned coal on the trip to the Columbia, but Shaver planned to convert the vessel into an oil-burner. It was reported that Shaver intended to use Coquille on the lower Columbia river to bring logs out of creeks and sloughs, so that larger vessels could tow them to Portland. Although the length and beam of the vessel were unaffected, this reconstruction reduced the overall size of Coquille to 53 gross and 36 net tons. The home port for Coquille was changed to Astoria.

== Sale by Shaver ==
On February 28, 1918, Shaver Transportation sold Coquille to Knappton Mill and Lumber Company. The new owners placed Capt. J.H. Lamley in charge of Coquille, which they planned to use to tow log rafts the Grays and Deep rivers, both of which were Washington state tributaries of the lower Columbia river. This sale left nine boats in the Shaver flotilla. Coquille had been the only propeller-driven steamer belonging to Shaver.

== Service with Knappton Towing ==
On May 2, 1919, when Coquille and another Knappton towboat, Defender were towing the hulk Ontepro down the Columbia River, the tow struck a drawbridge at Youngs Bay belonging to the Spokane, Portland & Seattle Railway. On December 4, 1919, a lawsuit was filed against the Knappton Mill company in federal district court, which sought $8,756.37 in damages. Coquille remained in service with the Knappton Towboat Company as of July 1, 1922.

Coquille was still registered as being in service in 1935, with a home port of Astoria, under the ownership of the Knappton Towing Co. Crew at that time was shown as five, and the vessel's machinery was listed as generating 225 horsepower. Knappton Towing's office was located at the foot of 14th Street, in Astoria.

== Modern cultural depiction ==
Murals showing Coquille and other steamboats were painted on the exterior walls of the Coquille City Hall in 1997.

== See also ==
- Steamboats of the Coquille River
