= Wolverine (motor vessel) =

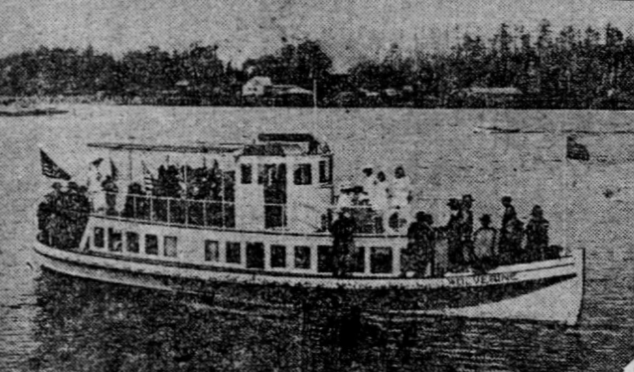
- Wolverine sometime prior to 1913.

History
- Name: Wolverine
- Owner: Orsan R. Willard
- Port of registry: Coos Bay, Oregon
- Builder: Max Timmerman, Coos Bay, Oregon
- In service: 1908
- Identification: U.S. 204972

General characteristics
- Type: Inland passenger
- Tonnage: 14 gross tons, 10 net tons
- Length: 50.3 ft (15.33 m)
- Beam: 10.2 ft (3.11 m)
- Depth of hold: 4.8 ft (1.46 m)
- Installed power: gasoline engine, 50 horsepower
- Propulsion: propeller
- Crew: one

Wolverine was a launch powered by a gasoline engine that operated on the Coquille River on the southern coast of Oregon, United States, from 1908 to the 1920s. Later the boat operated on Coos Bay, and, in the mid-1930s, was transferred to Eureka, California. Wolverine is principally known for its early service as a high-speed passenger vessel.

== Design and construction ==
Wolverine was built in Marshfield, Oregon in 1908 at the boatyard of Max Timmerman. J.F. Haehnel was one of the builders.

The original owners of were Capt. Orsan R. "Ott" Willard and Capt. E.D. Stuller, who were also to operate the boat themselves. Willard had commanded the steamboat Antelope when that vessel was operating as a fishing tender on the Coquille River in 1906.

The plans for Wolverine showed the boat to be 56 ft (17.07 m) (or 61 ft (18.59 m)) long, with a beam of 10 ft (3.05 m) feet. and depth of hold of 4 ft (1.22 m). Officially the dimensions of the boat turned out somewhat different. In 1911, the registered measurements for Wolverine were 50 ft (15.24 m) long, 10.2 ft (3.11 m) beam, and 4.8 ft (1.46 m) depth of hold. Wolverine was 14 gross and 10 net tons in overall size.

Passenger capacity was reported to be 75. Total required crew was only one. Power was to be supplied by a 50-horsepower Wolverine engine, which was reported to have been able to drive the boat at "a speed far beyond anything ever turned out on Coos Bay", or according to another report, 15 miles per hour. The official merchant vessel registry number was 204972.

== Launch and delivery ==
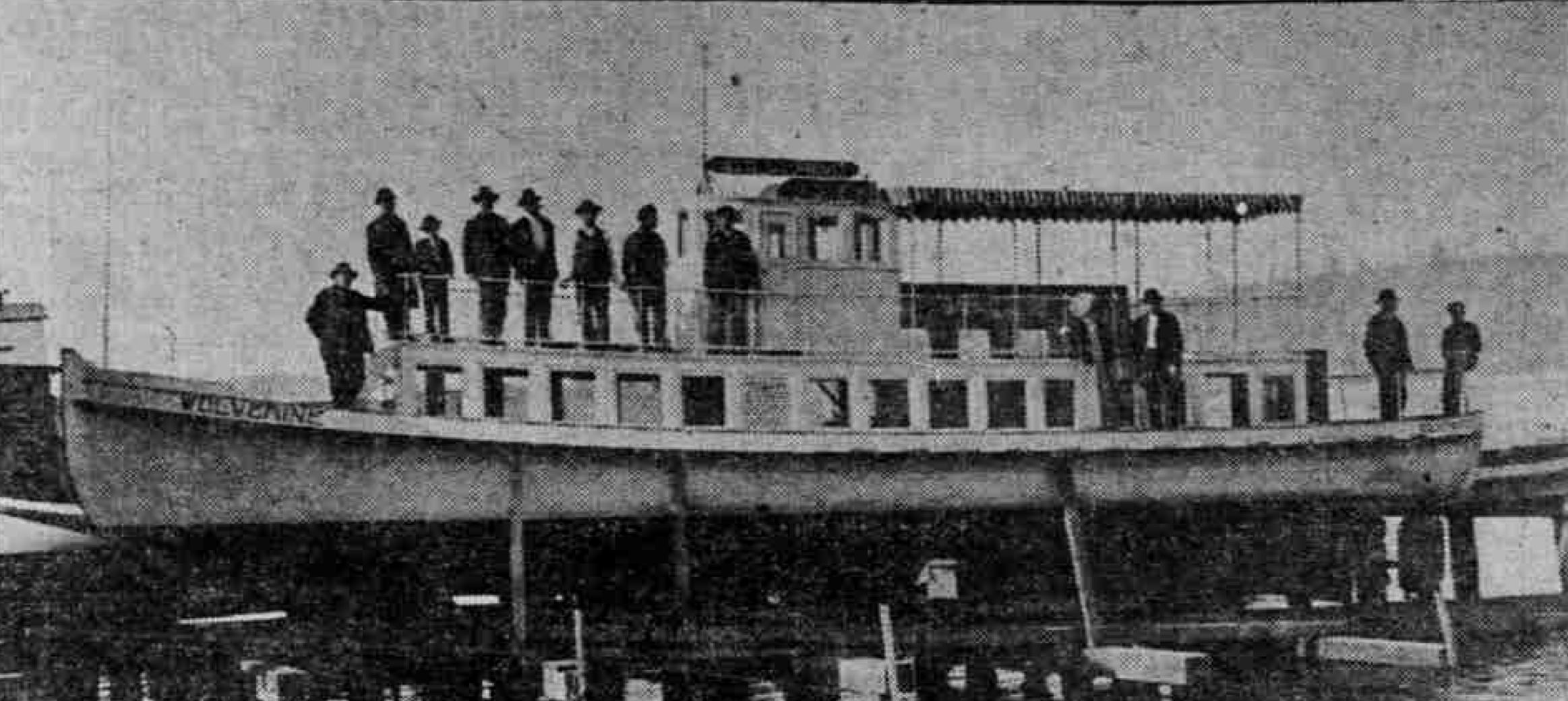
Wolverine on shipways at the Max Timmerman yard in Marshfield, prior to launch

Wolverine was launched late in the afternoon of April 2, 1908. The boat was christened at its launching by Miss Mary Peterson, of Marshfield. With the boat having been built in Coos Bay, it was necessary to take it out into the open ocean to the Coquille River to be placed into service, which "attracted much attention, as it was built for river rather than open sea work."

On April 22, 1908, Wolverine ran from Empire, Oregon south down the coast to Bandon in about 2.5 hours, much better time than had been expected. A number of Marshfield men were taken on the trip, including Mayor Straw.

Wolverine departed Empire at 5:20 pm. The seas were reported to have been heavy. Wolverine safely passed both the Coos Bay and Coquille River bars, and arrived in Bandon at about 8:00 p.m. Hundreds of people came to the Bandon docks to see the arrival of the new vessel and greet the people from Coos Bay. One of the passengers found a telephone station in Bandon and placed a telephone call back to Marshfield to report the boat's arrival.

== Operations ==
Wolverine at Coquille, sometime between 1908 and 1914. Steamer Favorite visible on right.

Once in service, Wolverine met the morning train from Marshfield at Coquille City. Wolverine made the river trip from Coquille City to Bandon in two hours, making a substantial improvement in the overall traveling time from Marshfield to Bandon, which had previously taken an entire day. The improved service was expected to greatly benefit the business interests of Bandon and also the smaller inland towns. In January 1909, Wolverine was described as a "popular" boat.

The distance on the river from Bandon to Coquille City was 26 miles.

In April 1910, Wolverine made one round-trip per day on this route, for a total of 52 river miles travelled daily.

On February 9, 1913, it was reported that Wolverine and the steamboat Coquille carried about one-half of the passengers traveling between Coquille City and Bandon. The other four vessels then operating on the river accounted for the rest. From June 1912 to January 1, 1913, Wolverine carried 13,000 passengers, compared with Coquille's 21,000 (about 100 per trip) during the same period.

In January 1913, there were four vessels operating on the Coquille River that transported both passengers and freight. Of these, two ran from Bandon to Myrtle Point and the other two covered only the route from Bandon to Coquille. In addition, there were two passenger-only boats operating on the river between Bandon and Coquille. These were the steamer Coquille and the motor vessel Wolverine.

== Ownership changes ==
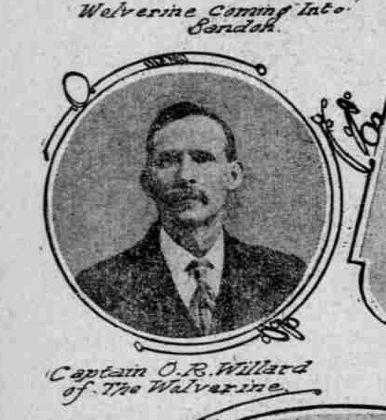
Capt. Orsan R. Willard, photo published January 1913

In July 1908, Orsan R. Willard bought out the one-half interest of E.D. Stoller in Wolverine, which the newspaper described as "that neat little boat." On August 1, 1908, it was announced that F.F. "Eli" Swearingen of Coquille had bought a one-half interest in the Wolverine. In January 1909, Willard had bought out Swearingen's share, and had returned to being sole owner of Wolverine. By April 1910, O.R. Willard was the sole owner of Wolverine.

In May 1914 Captain Charles Ashton, and Captain O.R. Willard and associates took over operation of Wolverine, Coquille and the motor vessel Charm. Captains Thomas White and Gurley Doak would take over operation of the sternwheeler Dispatch and were going operate it in freight service between Bandon and Coquille.

In 1925, Carl W. Egenhoff, of Marshfield, was shown as the owner of Wolverine. Ownership changed by 1926, to Ed Sprague, of North Bend, Oregon. Ownership passed to Philip J. Keizer by 1927.

== Collisions with Coquille ==
On the Saturday before January 19, 1909, the steamer Coquille collided with Wolverine. Wolverine pulled up to the landing at Rocky Point to pick up some passengers. Coquille, a boat owned by the competing Coquille River Transportation Company, was closely following Wolverine and became caught in the river current, causing Coquille to butt into Wolverine before Captain White, of Coquille, could regain control of his vessel. Wolverine was badly damaged, but the full extent could not be estimated until boat could be evaluated, which the two companies concerned agreed to settle by arbitration.

On September 16, 1909, there was a second collision between Coquille and Wolverine, this time at Johnson's Mill. Capt. W.T. Panter had been in charge of Coquille at the time of the collision. Capt. O.R. Willard was in charge of Wolverine. No damage was sustained by either vessel. However, by October 5, 1909, Orsan R. Willard, owner of Wolverine, had filed a charge with the U.S. Steamboat Inspection Service against T.R. Panter, owner of the river steamer Coquille to the effect that while Wolverine had been docked, Panter had deliberately rammed Coquille into Wolverine. Several affidavits from passengers on the Wolverine were included with the charges.

On or before October 18, 1909, two steamboat inspectors and a secretary had departed Portland, Oregon, bound by steamer to the Coos Bay region to investigate, among other things, the collision of September 16, 1909, between Wolverine and Coquille, and the charges that had been brought. The hearing on the Willard accusation was scheduled to be held on October 23, 1909, in Coquille, Oregon. On October 28, 1909, the Steamboat Inspection Service announced its decision. The license of Orsan R. Willard, master of Wolverine, would be suspended for 30 days, and the license of Thomas W. Panter, master of Coquille, would be suspended for 60 days.

== Accidents ==
In November 1909, Captain Willard was keeping Wolverine tied to a floating log boom on his place on the Coquille River. The previous Monday night the river rose rapidly in what was called a "freshet". A log raft came down the river and somehow jammed into Wolverine and tore off the vessel's propeller.

On February 21, 1910, it was reported that in a driving rain Wolverine collided with a smaller gasoline boat that was occupied by a Coquille physician, but due to the maneuvering of Captain Willard at the wheel, Wolverine barely struck the smaller boat, so the damage was much less and no one was hurt.

== Further charges against owners ==
In 1915, another Willard-operated boat, Dora came into fierce competition with the gasoline launch Charm run by the Panters. In January 1915, there was a collision between Dora and Charm, and the captains of the vessels, O.R. Willard, of Dora, and Allen Panter, of Charm, each claimed the collision was the other's fault.

Following the collision, the crews of the two vessels exchanged intemperate words, and someone was said to have thrown a gaspipe through a window on one of the vessels, while it was also claimed that someone had heaved a can of coal oil at the Dora. Someone concerned about passenger safety contacted Sheriff Johnson, who in turn referred the matter to the Steamboat Inspection Service. The inspectors instructed captains Willard and Panter to each submit written reports of the incident.

On February 3, 1915, following a two-day trial before inspectors Edwards and Fuller, the U.S. Steamboat Inspection Service suspended, for 20 months each, the licenses of Captains Walter Panter and Allen Panter, as well as that of engineer William Panter, all of the Myrtle Point Transportation Company, as well as the licenses of Capt. O. R. Willard and engineer Elmer Willard, both of the Coquille River Company. Both the Panters and the Willards were barred from operating any vessel on the Coquille River or anywhere else.

== Later years ==
On July 13, 1915, it was announced that Captain Willard had sold his interest in the Coquille River Transportation Company and would refit Wolverine as the nucleus of another steamboat line. However, the next day, in another newspaper, it was reported that a Captain Lloyd "will run the gasoline boat Wolverine built on Coos Bay and run for a long time by Captain Willard on the passenger run between Coquille and Bandon." The newspaper also stated that Wolverine "is to be taken south and will be remodeled."

By August 1915, Wolverine had been inactive for two years. There had been an announcement on June 29, 1915, that Wolverine had been sold and would be transferred to California for use on the Sacramento River. However, not long later, on July 13, 1915, there was another announcement that Wolverine was to be operated independently by Captain Willard. A week later, Captain Willard was reported to be "rebuilding the Wolverine, which has been tied up for some time" to establish a new transportation line between Bandon and Coquille City. Wolverine was to be made larger with a more powerful engine installed.

Wolverine appears to have remained out of service until and possibly after January 25, 1916, when it was reported that the boat was "tied up". On that date, Capt. Willard was reported to have "got the Wolverine in shape and ran her a couple of days." Willard was also reported at the same time to be running Wolverine on the river in competition with another line.

Wolverine was still registered in 1925. The boat was transferred to service on Coos Bay by that time. In 1926, Wolverine was operating out of Marshfield in miscellaneous service. This continued until 1934, when the boat was under the ownership of E.E. Sprague, of North Bend.

In 1935, Wolverine was still listed on the registry of merchant vessels, but with a new home port of Eureka, California, and a new owner, William Kay.

== See also ==
- Steamboats of the Coquille River
- Coos Bay Mosquito Fleet
