= Dispatch (sternwheeler) =

American steamboat

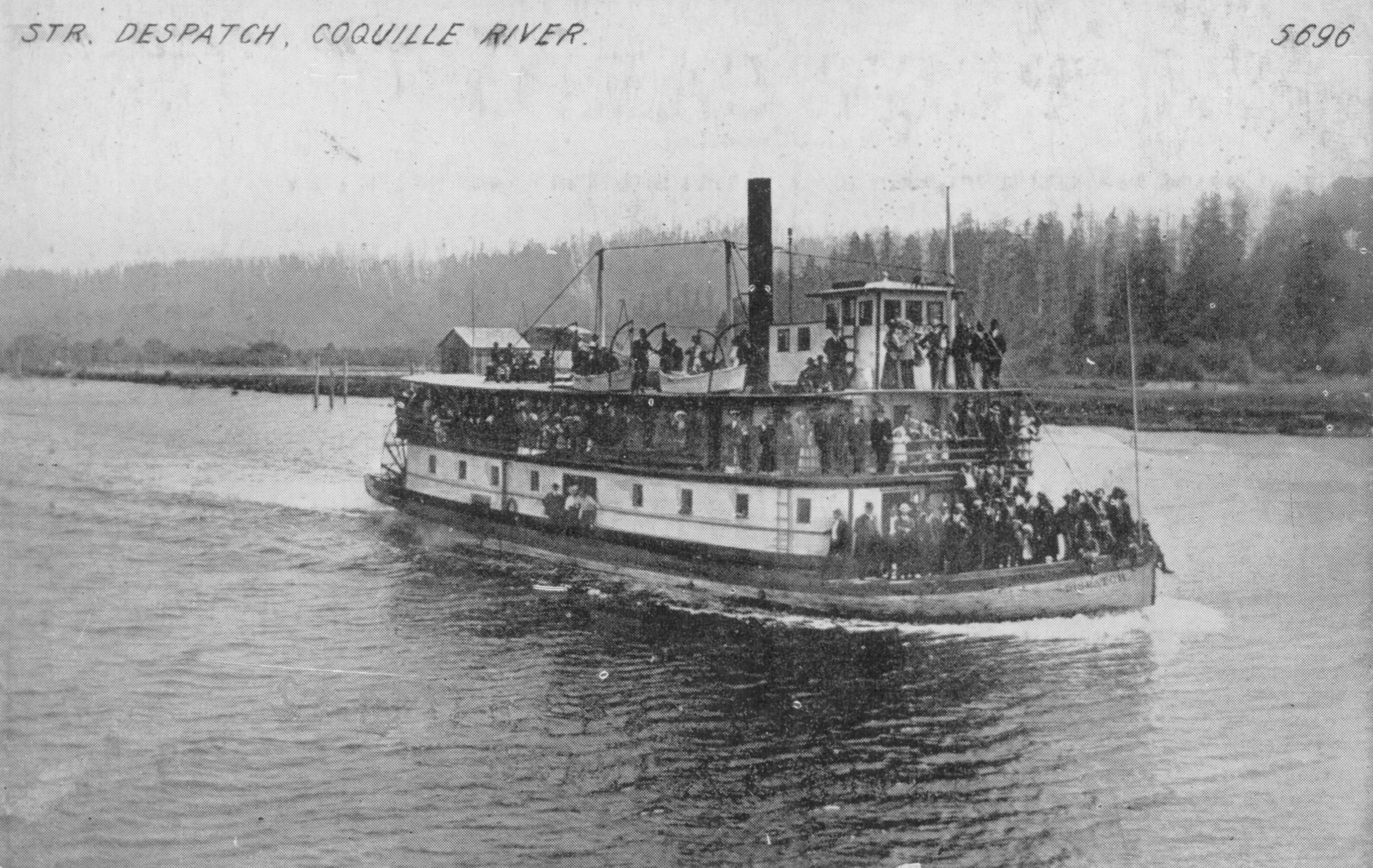
- Dispatch on the Coquille River circa 1910

History
- Name: Dispatch
- Port of registry: Coos Bay, Oregon
- Builder: Charles Trigg, Parkersburg, Oregon
- Cost: $18,000
- In service: 1903
- Identification: U.S. 200081
- Notes: Operated as John Wildi after 1920.

General characteristics
- Type: Inland passenger/freight
- Tonnage: 250 gross tons; 167 net tons
- Length: 111.4 ft (33.95 m)
- Beam: 24.5 ft (7.47 m)
- Depth of hold: 4.7 ft (1.43 m)
- Decks: two
- Installed power: Twin steam engines, horizontally mounted.
- Propulsion: Sternwheel
- Crew: Five (5).

Dispatch was a sternwheel steamboat that was operated on the Coquille River on the southern Oregon coast from 1903 to 1920. The name of this vessel is sometimes seen spelled Despatch. This sternwheeler should not be confused with an earlier and somewhat smaller sternwheeler, also named Dispatch, that was built at Bandon, Oregon, in 1890, for which the 1903 Dispatch was a replacement.

== Construction ==
Dispatch was built in 1903 at Parkersburg, Oregon by Charles Trigg. Dispatch was 111.4 ft (33.95 m) long, with a beam of 24.5 ft (7.47 m) and depth of hold of 4.7 ft (1.43 m). The overall size of the vessel was 250 gross and 167 net tons. The official registry number was 200081 and the required number of crew was five.

Dispatch was reported to have cost $18,000 to construct and was said to have been "one of the finest river steamers ever built in this part of Oregon".

== Owners ==
For twenty-four years (1903 to 1927), Dispatch operated on the route on the Coquille River from Bandon to Coquille City. During this time, Dispatch was owned by the Coquille River Steamboat Company, the Farmers Transportation Company, and the Coquille River Transportation Company.

On July 18, 1907, it was announced that the five steamers then operating on the Coquille River were to come under new management. A new corporation was to be formed with a capital stock of $50,000. C.J. McLean and H.G. Stratton, of Portland, and F.A. Smith, of St. Johns, were among those interested in the corporation. Liberty and Dispatch were to have new boilers, and Antelope would be overhauled.

On July 17, 1914, Dispatch was owned by the Coquille River Transportation Company. On that date, Dispatch was advertised as departing Bandon daily at 7:00 a.m.

== Operations ==
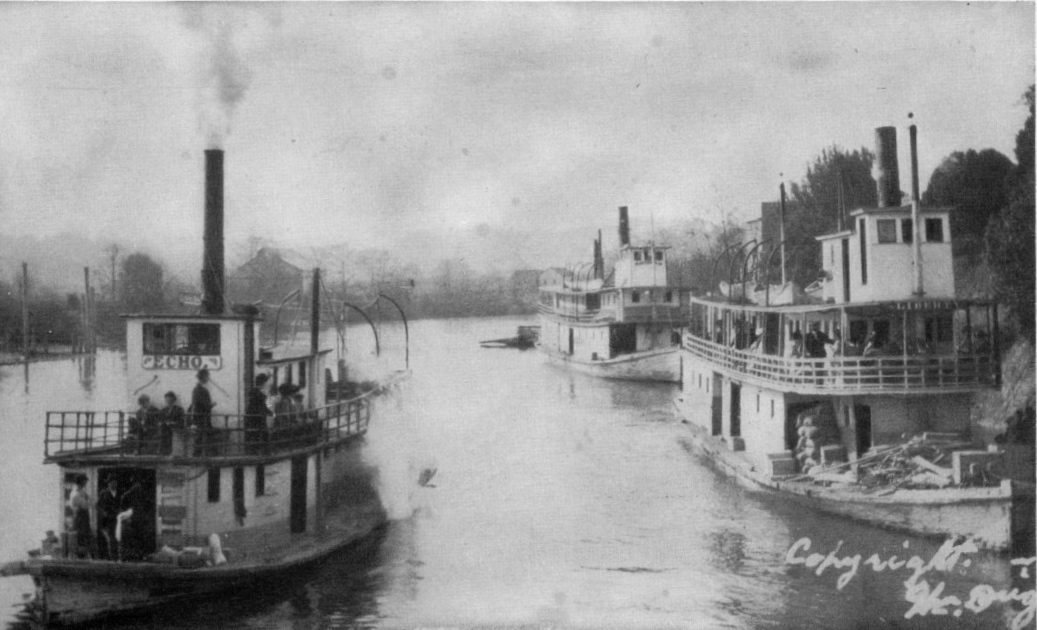
Echo (left), Liberty (right), and Dispatch (center-right) at Coquille circa 1910

In 1903, Dispatch became one of a number of steamboats competing for freight and, especially, passenger business on the Coquille River. Three boats, Dispatch, Liberty, and Reta were then leaving Bandon each morning. Favorite left Coquille City in the morning for Bandon and returned to Coquille City in the evening. It was anticipated that Antelope, once fishing season ended, would be put on the Bandon-Coquille City run, making a total of five steamers daily operating on the route. Reta carried the mail so as to allow Dispatch to make better time.

As of March 17, 1904, Dispatch, under Captain Thomas White, departed Bandon every morning except Sunday at 7:30 a.m., bound for Coquille City. Passengers could make connections at Coquille City at 10:30 a.m., either with the train or with the steamer Myrl. Dispatch then left Coquille City at 12:30 p.m., returning to Bandon at 4:30 p.m. This same schedule was still in effect on May 18, 1905.

With the fall harvest in 1904, the owners of the steamers decided to take advantage of the need for fodder in the towns along the river. On September 1, 1904, Dispatch, and the steamers Liberty and Favorite offered to deliver baled hay (grass and clover) to Bandon or Coquille City at a price of $11 per ton.

In October 1908, Dispatch, under F.D. White, master, departed Bandon daily at 7:00 a.m. arrived at Coquille City at 9:30 a.m., then departed Coquille City at 1:00 p.m. and returned to Bandon at 3:30 p.m. Dispatch advertised "all kinds of steamboat work done at reasonable prices."

Large numbers of people were sometimes transported on the small steamers on the Coquille River. For one baseball game at Bandon, Dispatch came downriver from Coquille with about 400 people aboard, and Telegraph arrived with 150 more.

Vessels like Dispatch typically did not run regular schedules on Sundays. They were however available for Sunday excursion trips, which were a popular means of recreation in those times. In one example, on Sunday, June 23, 1907, Dispatch, along with two other steamers owned by the Coquille River Steamboat company, Liberty and Favorite, were chartered for an excursion to Bandon. This excursion, which was billed as "the finest observation train excursion ever seen on the Pacific Coast", was organized by the Coos Bay, Roseburg and Eastern Railway, would be run on the rail line's tracks south from Marshfield to Coquille City, where transfer would be made to the steamers for the water portion of the excursion downriver to Bandon.

== Groundings and accidents ==
Dispatch somewhere on the Coos River

On Friday, January 15, 1904, Dispatch, then owned by the Coquille River Steamboat Company, ran into a snag which tore a hole in the bow. A hard wind was blowing on the steamer's high superstructure, which made the vessel unmanageable. The only course of action was to beach the vessel.

After Dispatch was beached, the tide went out, causing the steamer to settle, breaking the hog chains, an important structural component, which could cause severe damage to the boat. The initial report was that Dispatch's hull had split in two, with the damage so great that the cost of repair would exceed the value of the vessel. However, a later report, indicated that Dispatch was quickly running again, with "the report of the accident having been much exaggerated."

On October 26, 1904, Dispatch was unloading a cargo of 2,000 cases of canned salmon at Cedar Point, Oregon. These goods were to be shipped by train to Marshfield and thereafter, likely by steamer, to Portland. A tram car was being used to aid in the unloading. The cable for the tram car became unhooked and its load of salmon cases fell into the river. Some of the goods were recovered, but it was necessary to relabel the cans.

On Monday, November 29, 1909, Dispatch was operating near the town of Bandon with a large number of passengers on board, when, in turning around, the vessel was caught by the fast current of the river and carried downriver into the jetty. One of the railings on the Dispatch was broken, and the Bandon life-saving crew had to take off the passengers. Sea conditions on the Coquille River bar were very rough. One witness thought that had the Dispatch not been caught on the jetty, it would likely have been washed out to sea and swamped.

On the morning of April 27, 1910, a small fire was discovered in the hold of Dispatch while the steamer was en route from Bandon to Coquille City. The fire had not progressed far, and was extinguished with the only damage being to a few life preservers.

On the early morning of Saturday, November 29, 1913, Dispatch was blown ashore on the Timmons mud flats just upriver from Moore's mill. The Coquille River life-saving crew and the tug Klyhyam went to the assistance of Dispatch. They took off the passengers and the vessel was refloated at the next high tide.

== Thieves and pilferage ==
Dispatch had a barber shop concession on board, which also sold tobacco. On July 21, 1904, it was reported that the previous Friday night, thieves had broken into the on-board barber shop, by breaking the latch between the shop room and the forward cabin, and taking $18 worth of cigars. The next Sunday night a quantity of tobacco was reported to have been removed from a package.

Freight pilferage was also a problem. On the next to the last trip prior to July 21, 1904, so much freight was stolen off Dispatch that the loss to the company exceeded the amount received for delivering the freight. A local newspaper expressed dismay that these incidents were becoming more frequent, adding that "Salem [the location of the state penitentiary] has a proper retreat for such characters, and they should be forced to emigrate there and be properly attired."

== Mechanical problems ==
Dispatch and Favorite at Coquille City circa 1910

Dispatch was out of service from the fall of 1907 to the spring of 1908 because of mechanical problems. On October 17, 1907, it was reported that Dispatch had been out of service "for some time" waiting for new boilers to arrive from San Francisco. The old boilers had been condemned by the steamboat inspectors. Dispatch had been kept at a dock pending delivery of the boilers, but the week before the October 17 report, it had been necessary to tow the boat upriver to free up the wharf space for active vessels.

On March 28, 1908, it was reported that the new boiler had been placed into Dispatch, and the connections were in the process of being made. The boat was being repainted in white trimmed with red. The new boiler was larger than the old one, and was expected to drive the vessel at a greater speed. The boat was expected to be back in operation by April 1, 1908, or a few days later.

By May 10, 1908, Dispatch was back in service, being scheduled that day to pick up a train-load of excursionists from Marshfield at Cedar Point, transport them to Bandon, arriving at 10:45 a.m., and then depart Bandon at 5:00 to return to Cedar Point to catch the train back to Marshfield.

Late in the afternoon of Saturday November 7, 1908, near Prosper, Oregon, a shaft pin, which connected the sternwheel's driving arm to the wheel itself, broke while Dispatch was underway, causing severe damage, estimated at $1,000, before the machinery could be halted. No one was injured, which was reported to have been "almost miraculous." It was initially estimated that it would take at least six weeks to repair the damage. The sternwheel steamer Liberty was called on to take over Dispatch's run on the Coquille River, which resulted in a delay of Liberty's then-scheduled transfer to Coos Bay service.

== Fire at shingle mill ==
On the afternoon of the Wednesday before June 13, 1916, at about 4:00 pm, fire broke out in the boiler room of the Kruse shingle mill, on the river near Prosper. Dispatch had just left the dock at Prosper when the fire was observed. The boat came alongside the mill and fought the fire with the on-board fire fighting equipment. Although there was some damage from the fire, the prompt intervention of Dispatch prevented the fire from spreading throughout the mill.

== Collision with Telegraph ==
On January 22, 1917, near Prosper, the sternwheeler Telegraph, under the command of Capt. Allan R. Panter, collided with Dispatch. Capt. Thomas O. White, of Dispatch, attributed the collision to "'pure cussedness'", apparently on the part of Captain Panter. As a result of this collision the license of Captain Panter was suspended for thirty days. About a year previously, Captain Panter's license had been suspended for 18 months, but the suspension time had been reduced following Panter's appeal. There had been a number of similar incidents on the river, and rivalry between the competing steamboat lines was thought to be the principal reason for the Coquille River cases being investigated by the steamboat inspectors.

== Loss of a crewman ==
On March 22, 1920, the drowning of a Dispatch crewman was reported. D.A. Davis, age 19, fell off the boat while milk was being loaded at the Walstrom wharf. No one saw him fall into the water, and he was not noticed missing until someone saw him disappear below the water's surface, 100 feet away from the boat, having been washed there by the tide.

== Transfer to Coos Bay ==
After 1920, Dispatch was transferred to Coos Bay and operated out of Marshfield under the name John Wildi.

== Modern cultural depiction ==
Murals showing Dispatch, Coquille and other Coquille River steamboats were painted on the exterior walls of the Coquille City Hall in 1997.

== See also ==
- Steamboats of the Coquille River
