= Telegraph (1914 sternwheeler) =

- Telegraph

History
- Name: Telegraph
- Owner: Myrtle Point Navigation Company
- Port of registry: Coos Bay, Oregon
- Builder: Herman Bros., Prosper, Oregon
- Launched: February 22, 1914
- In service: 1914
- Identification: U.S. 212094
- Fate: Abandoned

General characteristics
- Type: Inland passenger
- Tonnage: In 1915: 96 gross register tons, 63 net register tons
- Length: In 1915: 103 ft (31.39 m) In 1923: 85 ft (25.91 m)
- Beam: 16.2 ft (4.94 m)
- Depth of hold: In 1915: 4.3 ft (1.31 m); in 1923: 4.3 ft (1.31 m)
- Decks: one
- Installed power: twin steam engines, horizontally mounted
- Propulsion: sternwheel
- Capacity: About 150 passengers
- Crew: three (3)

Telegraph was a sternwheel steamboat that was operated on the Coquille River on the southern Oregon coast from 1914 to 1927. Telegraph is perhaps best known for having been in involved in collisions with rival steamboats, apparently as a result of fierce competition for business on the Coquille River.

== Design, construction, and launch ==
Telegraph was built at Prosper, Oregon in 1914 for the Myrtle Point Transportation Company. Telegraph cost $9,500 to build, and was launched at the Herman ranch. The designing naval architect was Dudley Collard.

Telegraph was 103 ft (31.39 m) long, with a beam of 16.2 ft (4.94 m) and depth of hold of 3.2 ft (0.98 m). At 96 gross tons, Telegraph was the largest vessel ever built for service on the Coquille River. Maximum passenger capacity was variously reported as 100, 150 to 200, or 200

Telegraph's sternwheel was driven by twin horizontally mounted steam engines, generating a total of 250 horsepower (190 kW). Each engine comprised a single cylinder with a 9-inch bore and a 42-inch stroke. Steam was generated by burning slab wood as fuel, as it was in all other steamers on the river. Passengers would be accommodated with street car-type chairs, and the vessel would have "all the equipment of a modern passenger boat."

Telegraph was launched on February 22, 1914, at the Herman Brothers yard near Prosper, Oregon. As launched, Telegraph was 85 ft (25.91 m) long, and had engines generating 280 horsepower (210 kW) . It was expected to take about a month after the launch to complete the vessel. Once complete, Telegraph was intended to be placed into regular service between Bandon and Myrtle Point.

== Owners ==
Telegraph's original owner was the Myrtle Point Transportation Company. However, on August 21, 1915, it was reported that Telegraph was owned by a competing concern, the Farmer's Transportation Company.

== Entry into service ==
On May 5, 1914 it was announced that Telegraph was complete and would enter into service the following morning, May 6, 1914, on the run between Bandon and Myrtle Point.

On October 16, 1914, Telegraph was reported to be going off the water for a few days at the Prosper boatyard. Telegraph's schedule would be taken over by Dora.

== Rivalry on the river ==
The initial owners of the company were the Myrtle Point Transportation Company, which mostly consisted of the large Panter family. When Telegraph was launched, there was a fierce and ongoing rivalry between the Panters, who owned other boats on the river, and the other operators, in particular (but not limited to) the Willards, who, doing business as the Coquille River Company, were operating the gasoline launch Charm.

In January, 1915, there had been a collision between the Panter-owned sternwheeler Dora and Charm. This resulted in an investigation by the U.S. Steamboat Inspection Service. On February 3, 1915, following a two-day trial before inspectors Edwards and Fuller, the service suspended, for 20 months each, the licenses of Captains Walter Panter and Allen Panter, as well as that of engineer William Panter, all of the Myrtle Point Transportation Company, as well as the licenses of Capt. O. R. Willard and engineer Elmer Willard, both of the Coquille River Company. Both the Panters and the Willards were also barred from operating any vessel on the Coquille River or anywhere else. As a result, the Panters had to hire a new captain for Telegraph, Harvey Dunham, and the Willards.

=== First collision with Charm ===
Motor vessel Charm

Collisions between rival vessels continued. On March 13, 1915, another Panter-owned boat, Telegraph this time, again collided with Charm. The March 11 collision occurred when Telegraph was ahead of Charm, and then stopped at a dock to take on passengers. Charm caught up with Telegraph and had almost passed the sternwheeler when Telegraph pulled away from the dock, with the bow of Telegraph striking Charm just a bit forward of the stern, spinning Charm across Telegraph's bow, and bow-first into the log boom at the landing.

Charm then went bumping along the log boom to a piling, called a "dolphin", securing the end of the boom, where Charm came to a halt. Engines on Telegraph were reversed, but not in time to prevent Telegraph from striking Charm a second time, as the smaller motor vessel was jammed up against the dolphin.

The crew of Charm claimed that they had blown four blasts on the motor vessel's whistle before overtaking Telegraph, but this was denied by the crew of the sternwheeler. Damaged to Charm consisted of three boards near the bow torn away, including damage below the waterline. Charm was laid up on Saturday night on the beach in Coquille City, where the vessel was pumped out and repaired sufficiently to move down river the next day, where Charm was hauled out at a shipyard and repaired more thoroughly. By Tuesday, March 16, Charm was back on its normal run.

On March 16, 1915, formal reports of the collision had reached the office of the U.S. Steamboat Inspection Service in Portland, Oregon.

According to the affidavit of George W. Leneve, master of Charm, at 2:16 pm on March 13, while Charm was en route from Bandon for Coquille City, at a one-half mile downriver from Cedar Point, Charm was ahead of Telegraph when it appeared that Telegraph was about to collide with Charm. Leneve swore that he gave four blasts on Charm's whistle as a warning signal, but this was ignored by Telegraph, which went ahead full speed and rammed Charm, damaging Charm so much that the motor vessel had to be beached to prevent it from sinking. Leneve said the bulwarks on the left side of Charm were damaged, and the fender strake (which protected the hull from damage) had been ripped all along the length of the vessel.

On the Tuesday and Wednesday before March 26, 1915, a hearing was held on the collision before U.S. steamboat inspectors George F. Fuller and E.S. Edwards. The evidence was reported to have shown that the collision was "largely in the nature of an accident." An unlicensed deck hand had been at the wheel of Telegraph at the time of the collision. Although the deck hand was deemed competent to handle the wheel, this was still a violation of the regulations, for which Capt. Henry Dunham, of Telegraph was held responsible. As a result, Dunham's license was suspended for 60 days. Dunham was replaced in charge of Telegraph by T.W. McCloskey, an experienced river man who had mostly worked on the route between Coquille City and Myrtle Point.

=== Second collision with Charm ===
On about September 1, 1915, Charm was backing up at a wharf and struck the bow of Telegraph. There was no damage, and the deck hands on Telegraph did not notice when the boats struck. However, Captain Panter of Telegraph filed a complaint with the steamboat inspectors, and, following an investigation, the license of George Leneve, captain of the Charm, was suspended for 60 days.

=== Collision with Dispatch ===
On January 22, 1917, at 3:40 pm, near Prosper, Telegraph, under the command of Capt. Allan R. Panter collided with the rival sternwheeler Dispatch. Capt. Thomas O. White, of Dispatch, attributed the collision to "pure cussedness" on the part of Captain Panter. Both captains filed reports with the steamboat inspection service. The points on which they agreed were that the steamers had been at Prosper, when Telegraph was backing away from the wharf, and then struck Dispatch on the left side near the rear of the vessel, where the engines were located. Dispatch was leaving the dock at the time. The collision caused the loss of about 20 feet of the rear portion of the cabin structure on Dispatch.

As a result of this collision the license of Captain Panter was suspended for thirty days. About a year previously, Captain Panter's license had been suspended for 18 months, but the suspension time had been reduced following Panter's appeal. There had been a number of similar incidents on the river, and rivalry between the competing steamboat lines was thought to be the principal reason for the Coquille river cases then being investigated by the steamboat inspectors.

== Disposition ==
Telegraph abandoned, June 26, 1941. Part of another sternwheeler, Dora can be seen on the right.

Automobile roads were built in the Coquille Valley in the 1920s, which quickly eliminated most of the demand for riverine passenger and freight service. In 1924, the closing of the Nestil Milk Condensing Plant in Bandon took away a major remaining customer for the boat. Telegraph was abandoned, along with several other steamboats, along the banks of the Coquille River at Lampa Creek.

== Plans in archive ==
In September 1992, five blackline plans on five sheets of Telegraph were donated to the Oregon Historical Society.

== See also ==
- Steamboats of the Coquille River
