= Antelope (steamboat) =

- Antelope at Bandon, Oregon, with a catch of more than 8,000 salmon, photo taken Sunday, October 6, 1906.

History
- Name: Antelope
- Port of registry: Coos Bay, Oregon
- Identification: U.S. 106440

General characteristics
- Type: Inland passenger/freight/towing
- Tonnage: 29.21 gross; 19.65 net
- Length: 60.3 ft (18.38 m)
- Beam: 11.2 ft (3.41 m)
- Depth: 4.6 ft (1.40 m) depth of hold
- Installed power: Steam engine
- Propulsion: propeller

Antelope was a steamboat that was operated on the Coquille River and on Coos Bay on the southern Oregon coast from 1886 to about 1908. Antelope was a versatile boat, which served in various roles, including passenger transport, barge towing, and as a fisheries tender.

== Construction ==
Antelope was built in 1886 at Marshfield, Oregon. The builder was either Capt. Olaf Reed (b.1827). or his brother, Capt. Hans R. Reed (b.1840).

In 1893, Antelope was registered as being 60.3 feet long, with a beam of 11.2 feet, and a depth of hold of 4.6 feet. The vessel measured out at 29.21 gross tons and 19.65 net tons. The registry number was 106440. As of the period 1891–1892, Antelope was fitted with a steam engine with a 10-inch cylinder bore diameter and a 12-inch stroke.

== Operation on the Coquille River ==
It was 23 miles from Bandon to Coquille City. In July 1890, Antelope made two round trips a day on this route. During the year 1890–1891, Antelope was reported to have been "irregularly employed" on the Coquille River.

== Jetty construction on Coos Bay ==
William E. Baines of Marshfield had a contract to supply stone to the Corps of Engineers for the construction of the north jetty at the Coos Bay Bar. The quarry for the stone was on the north fork of the Coos River, about 23 miles from the works. From August 24, 1891, to April 5, 1892, Baines used steamers to push scows loaded with stone from the quarry to the works. At first Baines used the steamer Express, but when that vessel burned, he brought in Antelope to do the work. Baines delivered 100 scow loads of rock from the quarry, with a total weight of 23,923 tons.

On September 20, 1895, it was reported that the steamer Antelope had changed hands, and was going to be withdrawn from the fish trade and placed into competition with the Dispatch on the run to Coquille.

In 1895, Antelope was owned and operated by engineer C.E. Lockwood (b.1858) of Bandon, Oregon. H.W. Dunham (b.1845), and his nephew Capt. Robert J. Dunham.

== Sinking during repair ==
Repairs of small vessels like Antelope were commonly done on the beach. For example, in July 1901, Capt. George Leneve beached Antelope to repair its propeller, which had lost one or two blades. However, there were risks associated with this method. On June 2, 1899, Antelope listed over and sank during the night while on the beach for repairs. The steamer lay with the stern towards the beach, and at high tide only the wheelhouse and part of the after cabin were clear of the water. Using a surf boatThe crew of Coquille River life-saving station boarded the stranded vessel and ran two wire cables under the bow, then ran the cables out to the windlass of the schooner Parkersburgh. After working all day they were able to raise Antelope enough so that the bulwarks were awash. During the following night, one of the cables parted, and the next morning new lines had to be run, from a different schooner and from a tug. The salvors eventually succeeded that morning in raising the Antelope, and pumping it out. The steamer was reported not to have been damaged by the swamping.

== Stranded on tide flats ==
On October 29, 1904, at 8:00 pm during a strong gale from the northwest, Antelope was blown ashore on the tide flats two miles south of the Coquille River life-saving station. Antelope sounded the whistle calling for assistance. The life-saving crew launched the surf boat, and took all eight passengers off from Antelope. The next morning Antelope was able to float free without further aid.

== Passenger service ==
In the fall of 1903, it was anticipated that Antelope, once fishing season ended, would be put on the Bandon–Coquille City run. Counting Antelope, this would make a total of five steamers running daily from Bandon to Coquille, the others being Dispatch, Favorite, Reta and Liberty.

On January 28, 1905, Antelope was scheduled to carry passengers free of charge from Bandon to a ball at Riverton (admission price $1 each). On May 20, 1905, Antelope similarly was scheduled to provide free transport from Bandon to a dance at Parkersburgh, Oregon.

In October 1906, Antelope was in service again as a fishing tender, under the command of Capt. Orsan R. "Ott" Willard. On Saturday, October 21, 1906, 7000 salmon were caught and delivered to the salmon cannery in Bandon, Oregon, and nearly as many were delivered to the cannery at Prosper. On Sunday, October 22, a photograph was taken of Ott Willard, his crew and their "floating palace", the Antelope, with two scows loaded with salmon lashed alongside, as they came to the dock in Bandon.

== Disposition ==
The final disposition of Antelope is unclear. It is possible that the vessel was dismantled in 1908, as it was reported in that year that Antelope's boiler was sold to Charles James and others to be installed in a new shingle mill that was to be built at a place called Two Mile, downriver from Bandon, Oregon.

== See also ==
- Steamboats of the Coquille River
- Coos Bay Mosquito Fleet
