= Echo (1901 sternwheeler) =

Steamboat

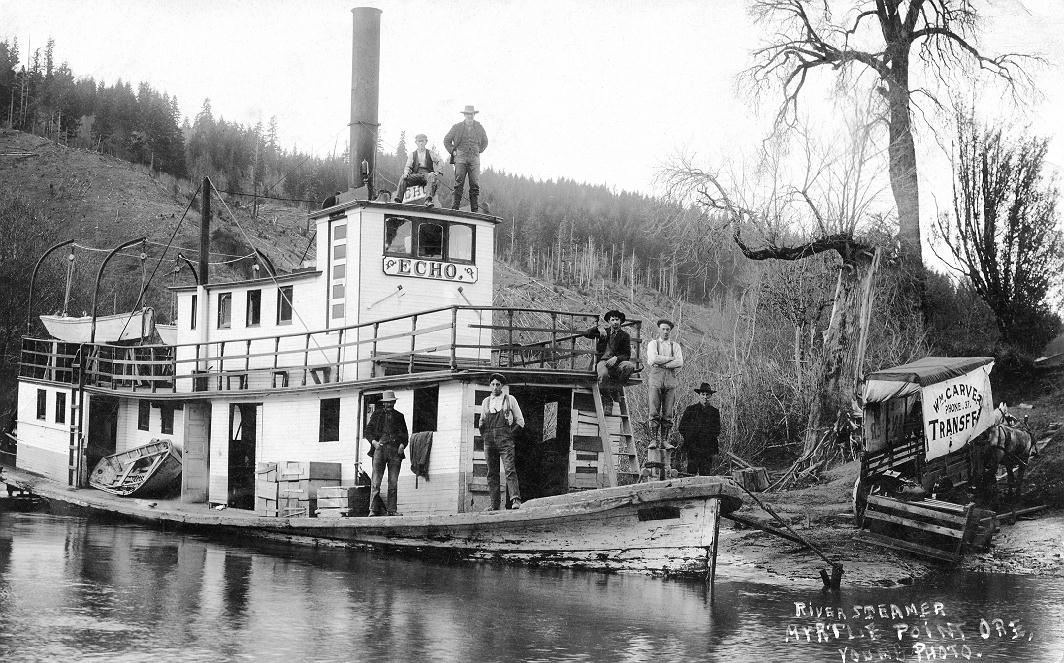
- Echo circa 1902 on Coquille River or tributaries.

History
- Name: Echo
- Port of registry: Coos Bay, Oregon
- Builder: Ellingson, Coquille, Oregon
- In service: 1901
- Identification: U.S. 136887
- Fate: Dismantled
- Notes: Engines to Dora in 1910.

General characteristics
- Type: Inland passenger/freight
- Tonnage: 76 gross tons; 49 registered tons
- Length: 65 ft (19.81 m)
- Beam: 16.4 ft (5.00 m)
- Depth of hold: 2.0 ft (0.61 m)
- Decks: two
- Installed power: Twin steam engines, horizontally mounted.
- Propulsion: Sternwheel

Echo was a sternwheel steamboat that was operated on the Coquille River on the Southern Oregon Coast from 1901 to 1910.

== Construction ==
Echo was built in 1901 at Coquille at the Ellingson yard. Echo was 65 ft (19.81 m) long, with a beam of 16.4 ft (5.00 m) and depth of hold of 2.0 ft (0.61 m), The overall size of the vessel was 76 gross and 49 net tons.

== Operations ==
In 1901 only three steamers served on the river between Coquille and Myrtle Point, these were the propeller Reta (18 registered tons) the sternwheeler Echo (53 registered tons) and Welcome (21 registered tons). Between these three vessels they hauled 1,554 tons of freight upriver and 2,834 tons downriver. Upriver, the biggest single item was general merchandise, 800 tons. Downriver was almost entirely agricultural products, with the biggest single item being 1,035 tons of milk. 10,187 passengers were carried up and downriver.

In October 1908, Echo, under E.H. James, master, departed Myrtle Point every day at 8:00 a.m. arrived at Coquille City at 10:00 a.m., then departed Coquille City at 1:00 p.m. and returned upriver to Myrtle Point at 4:00 p.m.

== Collision with Dixie ==
In the week prior to May 4, 1905, Echo collided with the launch Dixie at Coquille City. Echo's stern was twisted, and Dixie sustained some scratches, but there was no serious damage to either vessel.

== Sinking and salvage ==
At an unknown date, Echo sank in the Coquille River but was raised.

== Ownership change ==
In the first part of February 1910, Echo was operating on the run between Coquille City and Myrtle Point. At this time, the interest of Chief Engineer C.I. Kime in the vessel was bought out by Allen Panter. Allen Panter was the son of Capt. W.R. Panter, who owned the remaining interest in the steamer. Part of the deal also included transfer of an interest in the steamer Myrtle, which was used on the south and north forks of the Coquille River, and on runs upriver from Coquille when the water was low.

== Disposition ==
In 1910, Echo was dismantled and the machinery installed in a new sternwheeler, Dora, which was brought to Myrtle Point on the evening of October 19, 1910, by Captain Panter. Dora was reported to be larger and "better in every way" than the Echo.

== See also ==
- Steamboats of the Coquille River
- Echo (sternwheeler 1865)
- Echo (steam tug)
