= Steamboats of the Coquille River =

Main method of transportation in the Coquille River

Coquille River steam navigation
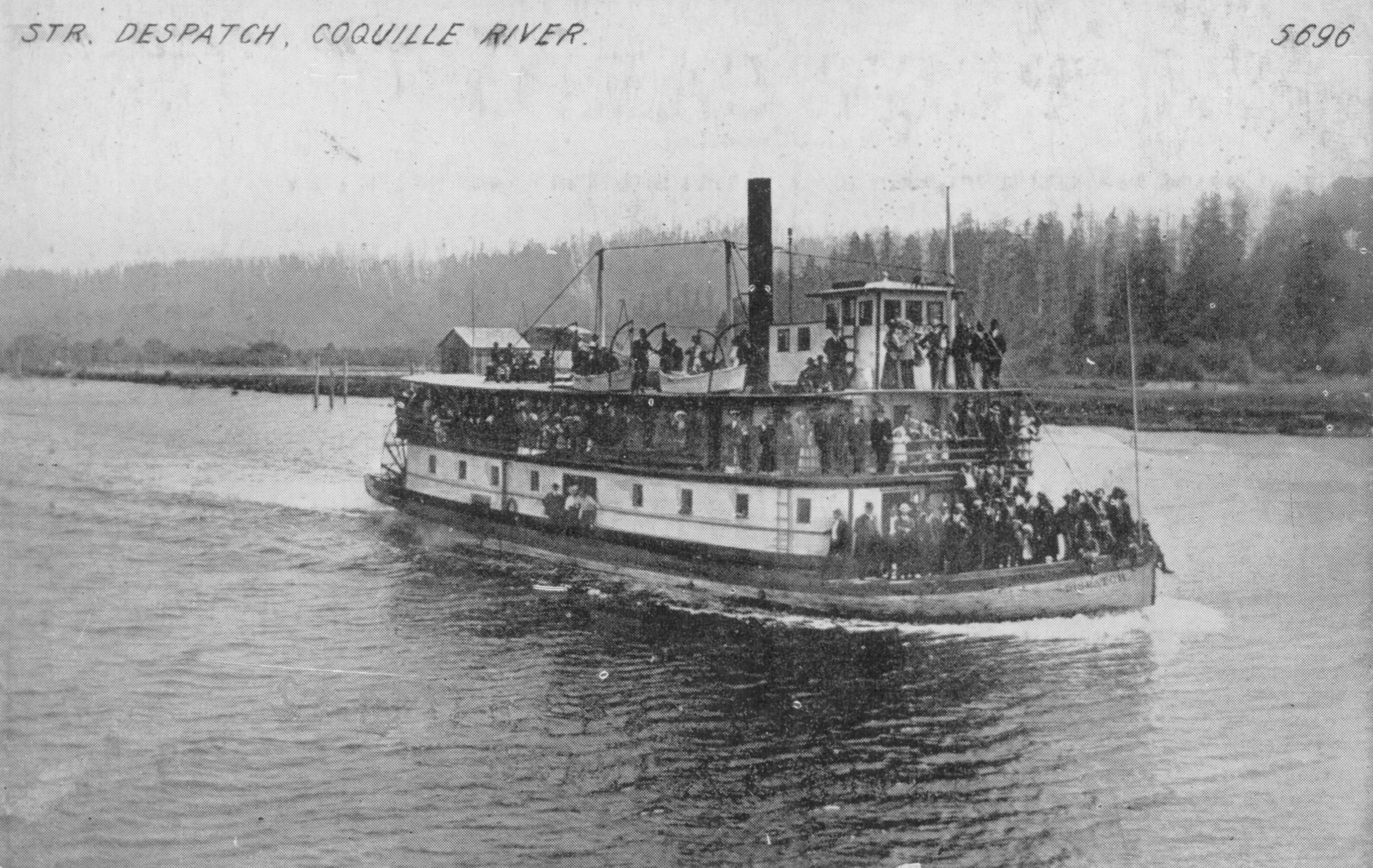
- Locale: Coos County, Oregon
- Waterway: Coquille River
- Transit type: Steamboat

The Coquille River starts in the Siskiyou National Forest and flows through the Coquille Valley on its way to the Pacific Ocean. Bandon, Oregon, sits at the mouth of the Coquille River on the Pacific Ocean. Before the era of railroads and later, automobiles, the steamboats on the Coquille River were the major mode of transportation from Bandon to Coquille and Myrtle Point in southern Coos County, Oregon, United States.

== Business and population expansion ==
Jetty construction at the two jetties at the Coquille River entrance allowed ocean-going ships to enter the mouth of the river and dock at Bandon. Economic activity boomed in Bandon in the early 20th century. A steamship line connected Bandon with Portland and San Francisco. From 1905 to 1910, the population tripled to 1800. Bandon had five sawmills and two shipyards.

== Rise of navigation by steamboats and other small vessels ==
As the river ran inland, it became so narrow that it was said that passengers could amuse themselves by leaning out the windows and picking flowers. William Russell Panter, a descendant of one of the first pioneer families in the area, was apparently one of the first to enter the inland steamboat business. Wm. R. Panter bought a small steamer, Maria, and put her in service above Coquille, towing a boat hauling milk from farms to the first creamery on the Coquille River, which was about two miles (3 km) up the river from Coquille. Panter later organized a run to the Timmons cannery in Bandon, towing a scow loaded with salmon caught by fishermen.

By 1899, a boatyard owned by Arthur Ellingson at Prosper, Oregon, began producing steamboats, starting with the small (26 tons) propeller steamer Reta, which operated on the Coquille and later on Coos Bay. In 1901, the Ellingson yard at Coquille built the sternwheeler Echo (76 tons), she ran for ten years under Captain J.W. McCloskey. Other boats in the early years of the century on the Coquille River included Liberty, which also served in Coos Bay, and Dispatch.

In 1900, S.H. McAdams, who owned a boatyard in Coquille, built the small (30 tons) sternwheeler Welcome. Also that year, Ellingson turned out the propeller steamer Favorite and the gasoline propeller Pastime. In 1901, Ellingson launched Echo and J. Warren, a 10-ton propeller steamer, both for service on the Coquille. Also in 1901, C.H. James launched the 15-ton propeller steamer Venus at Coquille. In 1903, the gasoline-powered Nellie & Cressy (12 tons) was built at Bandon. In 1903, Charles Trigg built Dispatch at Parkersburg, Oregon, for service on the Coquille River. After 1920, Dispatch was operated out of Marshfield as the John Widdi by the Coquille River Transportation Company.

In 1914, Carl Herman, who owned a boatyard at Prosper, Oregon, built the Telegraph for the Myrtle Point Transportation Company, which competed with the gasoline-powered propeller Charm on the Coquille River. Telegraph was (by one source) the last steamboat on the Coquille River. Her owners were able to secure a mail contract for her, but eventually the contract was re-awarded to truck route.

Various small boats were built on the Coquille River over the years, at Prosper, Parkersburg, Coquille, Randolph, and at the Hermann's ranch. These included Myrtle W. (12 tons), built in 1912 at Randolph, and Antelope, Fawn, Venus, and Maple. Carl Herman built many boats of various sizes at his yard at Prosper, including in 1909 the Sunset, (12 tons) and in 1909 the Star (12 tons), built for passenger and towing services on the Coquille River.

== Passengers and cargoes carried ==
Very large numbers of people were sometimes transported on the small riverboats. For one baseball game at Bandon, Dispatch came down from Coquille with about 400 people aboard, and Telegraph arrived with 150. At one point, Telegraph ran eight different Saturdays along the river to carry people to dances, sometimes at Prosper, sometimes at Parkersburg, Lampa and Riverton.

Coal mines in the area, served by the riverine craft, were at Lampa Creek, Panter's Ranch, Riverton, and Coquille. Coal was loaded onto ships bound for San Francisco. Early schools in the area were located at Bandon, Prosper, Randolph, Parkersburg, Lampa Creek, Riverton, Coquille, Arago, Myrtle Point, and Beaver Slough. The Pearcy Hanly ranch, across from Lampa Creek, shipped milk to Bandon on the river steamers for many years. There were a number of sawmills, salmon canneries, and other concerns along the river, including a woolen mill and a match factory at Bandon, all of which seem to have been served by the river boats.

== Rivalry among steamboat owners ==
In 1914, Telegraph (96 tons), the largest sternwheeler ever to serve on the Coquille, was built for the Myrtle Point Transportation Co., and launched at Prosper. She was 103' long, 16.2' on the beam, and with 3.2' depth of hold. Her engines had 9" cylinders with 42" stroke, developing 250 horsepower (190 kW). She was built to outcompete the gasoline-powered Charm, which in turn had been placed on the river to beat the old Myrtle, a considerably less powerful boat than Telegraph. Competition was keen on the Coquille, as a few months after entering service, Telegraph somehow managed to run Charm up on the beach near a narrow spot in the river above Bandon.

== Decline and end of riverine transport ==
The Ellingson yard built Relief in 1916, a 44-ton passenger and freight boat, which turned out to be the last new sternwheeler built on the Coquille River.

In 1924, the gasoline launch Charm was taken off the Coquille River route, and sold to Shaver Transportation Company, who re-equipped her with a 90 horsepower (67 kW) diesel engine and put her in service as a log boom boat.

The Myrtle Point Transportation Company owned the last riverboats on the Coquille. Stockholders of the company were Russell Panter, Walter Panter, William A. Panter, Paris Ward, and the Huffard brothers. Paris Ward owned a ranch near Bandon, and as the demand for riverine transport ended, the Panter family's boats were abandoned at the shore of his ranch, where by 1971 what remained of their hulls had filled up with sand.

Links to photos of the steamboat graveyard at the Ward ranch, all taken on June 26, 1941, showing Myrtle, Telegraph, and Dora beached along the Coquille River near Bandon. Note that while the Salem Public Library Images do not identify these steamers, Marshall does in his book and provides a photograph of the same place, at a slightly different time: Myrtle was apparently abandoned further inshore than Telegraph. This may explain why it appears that only two boats are abandoned on shore in photos taken from the water. Panter also identifies the three abandoned sternwheelers by name.

- Abandoned sternwheeler on the Coquille River, probably Telegraph, 1941
- Another view of same abandoned sternwheeler on Coquille River, showing a second vessel on the right
- Third photo of abandoned sternwheeler and other vessel, from different angle

== Image gallery ==
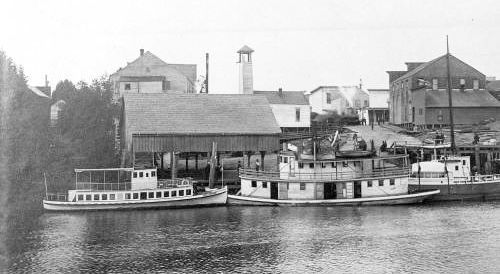
Wolverine, Favorite and Wilhemina at Coquille, circa 1911

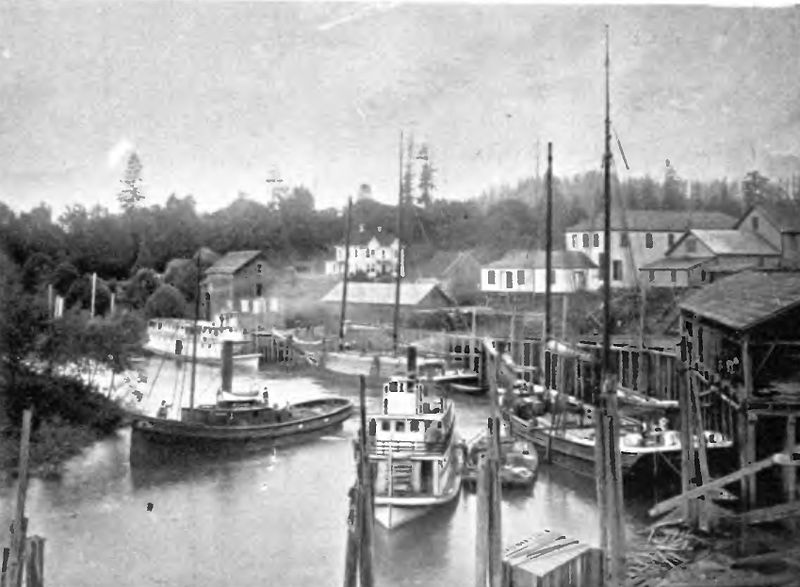
Coquille waterfront, sometime before 1895.

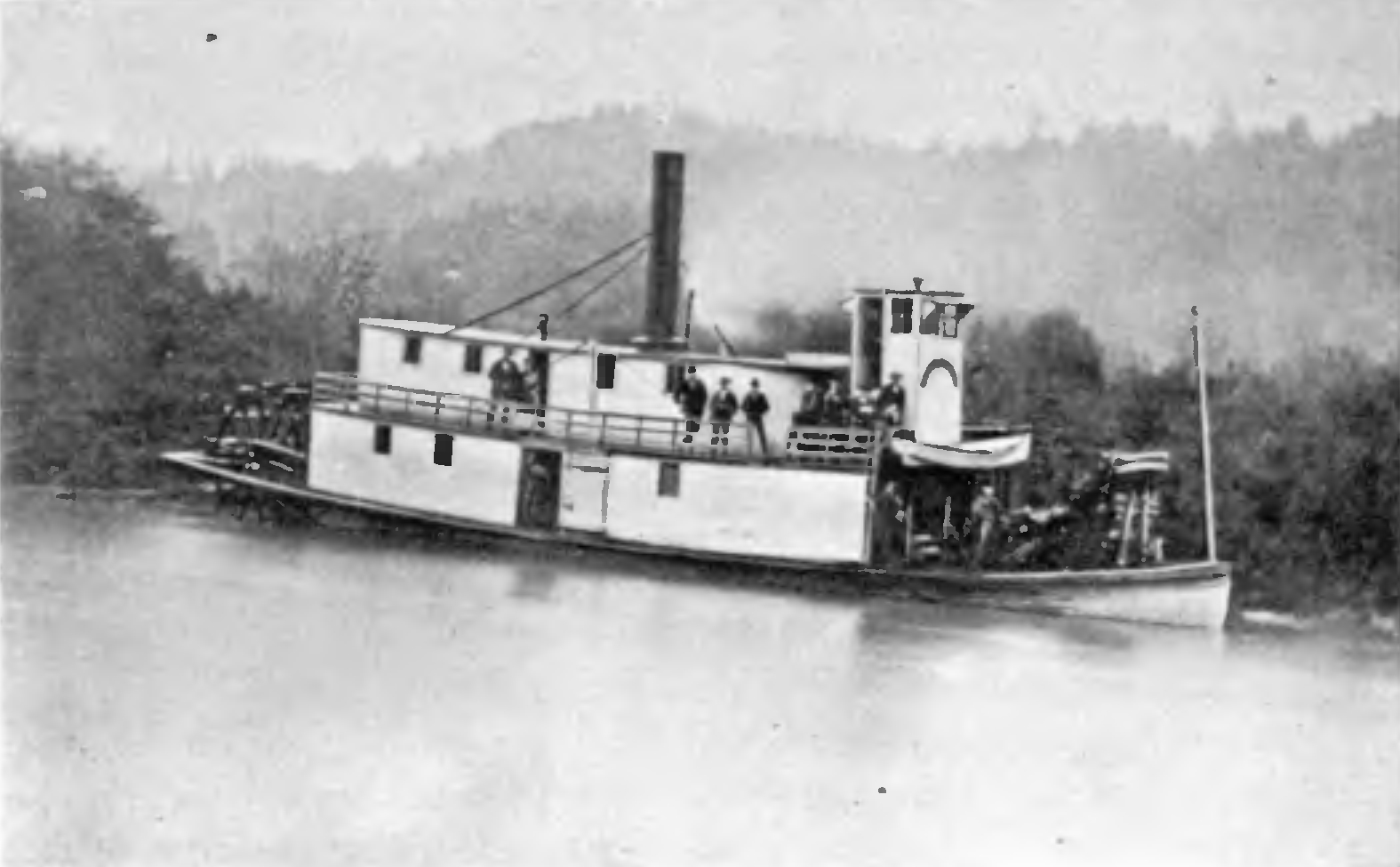
Little Annie

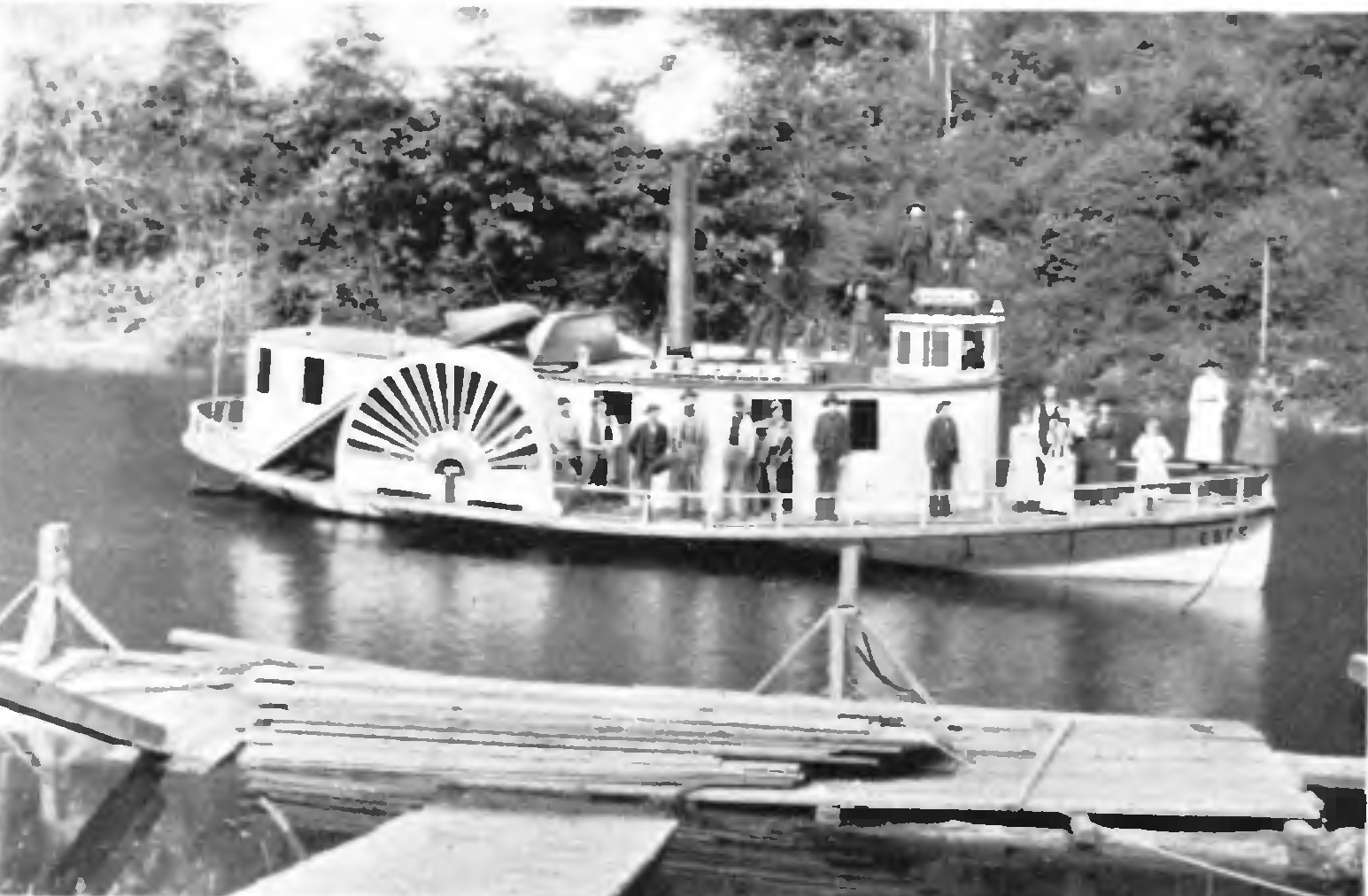
Steamer Coos, sometime before 1895

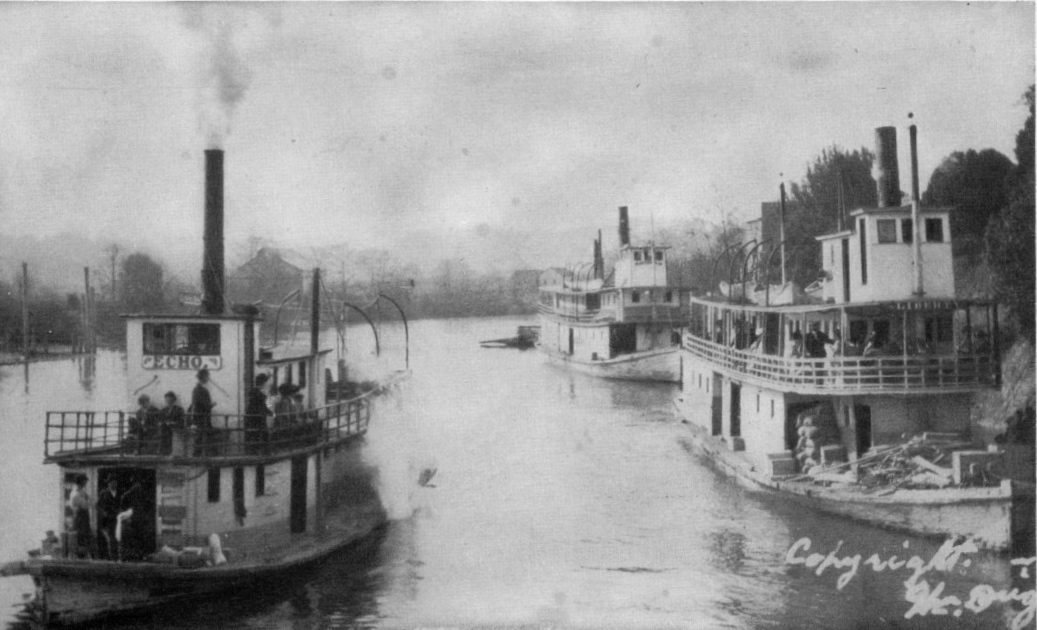
Echo (left), Liberty (right), and Dispatch (center-right) at Coquille circa 1910

== List of vessels on Coquille River ==
Codes for this chart:

Vessel type codes are: Prop = propeller-driven; stern = sternwheel-driven; side = side-wheel driven; pddl = paddle-driven, sternwheel or sidewheel.

Disposition codes used in this list are:

- A = Abandoned
- B = Burned
- NC = Name change
- O = Operational as of date given
- R = Rebuilt
- T = Transferred (T-Col = Transferred to Columbia River service)
- W = Wrecked by collision or striking ground
- X = Explosion of boiler
- Gr = gross tons; Reg = registered tons

Vessels should not be assumed to have served continuously in the service area shown during the periods shown on this chart; transfer between service areas was common.

Steamboats on the Coquille River
Name	Registry #	Type	Year built	Where built	Builders	Owners	Gross tons	Length		End year	Disposition
Name	Registry #	Type	Year built	Where built	Builders	Owners	Gross tons	ft	m	End year	Disposition
Antelope	106440	prop	1886	Marshfield	Reed, O.		33	64	19.5		
Ceres	125617	prop	1877	Coquille River	Reed, Edward		20	51	15.5	1887	O
Charm (Note: Charm, a motor vessel, was badly damaged by collision with Telegraph 1914, and forced to beach near Bandon. Repaired and ran on Coquille River until sale to Shaver Transportation Co. in 1928.)	211489	prop	1913	Prosper	Herman Bros.		42	75	22.9	1928	T-Col
Coos	125397	side	1874	Empire City			58	58	17.7		
Coquille (Note: Sold to Shaver Transportation Co. transferred to Columbia R., date and ultimate disposition unknown.)	205472	prop	1908	Coquille	Lowe, Frank		63	77	23.5		T-Col
Dispatch (1890) (Note: Disposition unknown, probably abandoned 1904.)	157278	stern	1890	Bandon			158	91	27.7	1904	A
Dispatch (1903) (Note: The 1903 Dispatch was rebuilt as the towboat John Wildi.)	200081	stern	1903	Parkersburg	Trigg, Charles		250	111	33.8	1922	R
Dora (Note: According to Panter, Early River Traffic, Dora was abandoned in 1927 at the Paris Ward ranch.)	208076	stern	1910	Randolph	Herman Bros.	Panter, W.R.	47	64	19.5	1927	A
Echo	136887	stern	1901	Coquille	Ellingson		76	66	20.1	1911	A
Elareto											
Favorite (Note: The Victor West gallery source says Favorite was built at Bandon. McCurdy, at 61, gives Coquille.)	121136	prop	1900	Coquille	Ellingson, A.		63	72	21.9	1917	
Fawn									1909	O	
J. Warren (Note: Shown as a motor vessel on the 1911 register.)	77511	prop	1901	Coquille			10	35	10.7		
John Wildi (Note: Ex Dispatch (1903).)	20081	stern	1922	Parkersburg			173	112	34.1	1927	A
Klihyam (Note: Klihyam was a steam tug.)	205787	prop	1908	Bandon			125	89	27.1		
Liberty		stern	1903	Bandon	Herman Bros.		174	91	27.7	1918	
Limit		prop							1909	O	
Little Annie (Note: According to Timmen, Blow for the Landing, at page 207, in 1890, Little Annie hit a snag and sank near Bandon. Timmen gives the place of construction as Myrtle Point, Oregon.)	40202	stern	1877	Coquille	Rackliff, Wm. E.		86	70	21.3	1890	W
Maple	209300	prop	1911	Randolph			33	62	18.9		
May			1910								
Mary (Note: Only information source for this steamer is the 1874 Annual Registry.)	90469	prop	1874	Coquille River			25				
Mud Hen		stern	1878	Coquille River				32	9.8	1892	
Myrtle (1908)	205908	prop	1908	Prosper			78	73	22.3		
Myrtle (1909) (Note: Myrtle (1909) is reported by the McCurdy Marine History to have been rebuilt as freighter in 1922. Mills, Sternwheelers Up Columbia reports Myrtle was abandoned 1922, this may be a conflict in the sources, or possibly the hull of the 1909 Myrtle was abandoned, with the cabins and machinery being reused. This was a common practice.)	206743	stern	1909	Myrtle Point	Nelson, Nels	Myrtle Point Trans. Co.	36	57	17.4	1922	R
Myrtle (1922) (Note: Panter, Early River Traffic states that by 1940, Myrtle (1922) was abandoned at the Paris Ward ranch.)	222091	stern	1922	Prosper			36	60	18.3	1940	A
Myrtle W. (1909)	206743	stern	1909	Myrtle Point	Nelson, Nels	Myrtle Point Trans. Co.	36	57	17.4		
Nellie and Cressy (Note: Nellie and Cressy also operated in Coos Bay.)		prop	1903	Bandon			12	33	10.1		
Norma			1911								
Pastime		stern	1900	Coquille			11	45	13.7	1901	
Port of Bandon			1938								
Randolph	208074	prop	1910	Randolph			42	60	18.3		
Rainbow	209654	stern	1912	Marshfield	Lowe, Frank	Coos River Trans. Co.	75	64	19.5	1923	A
Relief (1916)	214253	stern	1916	Coquille	Ellingson		44	64	19.5	1927	
Reta	111226	prop	1899	Prosper	Ellingson		26	53	16.2		
Star	206127	prop	1909	Prosper	Herman, Carl		12	40	12.2		
Sunset	206414	prop	1909	Prosper	Herman, Carl	Fredrick Elmore Drane Line	12	40	12.2	1929	A
Telegraph (Note: Telegraph was rebuilt and lengthened to 115' in about 1916. Panter, Early River Traffic, writes that by 1940 Telegraph was abandoned by 1940 at the Paris Ward ranch)	212094	stern	1914	Prosper	Herman, Carl	Myrtle Point Trans. Co.	96	103	31.4	1940	A
Venus	161884	prop	1901	Coquille			15	39	11.9		
Welcome	81707	stern	1900	Coquille	Adams, S.H.		30	56	17.1	1907	W
Wilhelmina	205444	prop	1908	North Bend			95	80	24.4		
Wolverine		prop	1908			O.R Willard, E.D Stuller				1909	O

== See also ==
- Coquille River Light
- Steamboats of the Oregon Coast

== Notes and sources ==
Vessel notes:

Source notes

Sources:

- Marshall, Don, Oregon Shipwrecks, Binford and Mort, Portland, OR 1984 ISBN 0-8323-0430-1
- Mills, Randall V. (1977) [1947]. Stern-wheelers up Columbia: A Century of Steamboating in the Oregon Country. Lincoln, Nebraska: University of Nebraska Press. ISBN 0-8032-5874-7.
- Newell, Gordon R. ed., H.W. McCurdy Marine History of the Pacific Northwest, Superior Publishing, Seattle WA (1966)
- Panter, William, "Early River Traffic on the Coquille," Glancing Back (Pioneer Lore), at 16–19, Vol. I, No. 1, Coos-Curry Pioneer and Historical Association (1971)
- Timmen, Fritz, Blow for the Landing – A Hundred Years of Steam Navigation on the Waters of the West, Caxton Press, Caldwell, ID (1973) ISBN 0-87004-221-1
- U.S. Engineer Office, Portland, Oregon, Preliminary Examination of Coquille River, Oregon, June 14, 1909, United States Congressional serial set, Issue 5732, 61st Cong., 2nd Sess. (1909–1910), p. 60
- Wright, E. W. (1895). Lewis & Dryden's Marine History of the Pacific Northwest. Portland, Oregon: Lewis & Dryden Printing Company.
