= Myrtle (sternwheeler) =

Steamboat

- Myrtle somewhere on the Coquille River or its tributaries. Another vessel of unknown name is on the right.

History
- Name: Myrtle
- Port of registry: Coos Bay, Oregon
- Builder: Max Timmerman, Coos Bay, Oregon
- In service: 1909
- Out of service: 1922
- Identification: U.S. 206743
- Fate: Abandoned

General characteristics
- Type: Inland passenger-freight
- Tonnage: as built: 36 gross; 29 net tons
- Length: as built: 57.4 ft (17.50 m)
- Beam: 15.8 ft (4.82 m)
- Depth of hold: 4.2 ft (1.28 m)
- Decks: one
- Installed power: twin steam engines, horizontally mounted
- Propulsion: sternwheel
- Notes: Shortened by 7.0 ft (2.13 m) in 1922 and converted to freighter.

Myrtle was a steamboat built in 1909 for service on the Coquille River and its tributaries, in Oregon. The ability of this small vessel to reach remote locations on the river system was cited many years later as evidence in support of the important legal concept of navigability.

This steamboat should not be confused with a somewhat larger vessel, also named Myrtle, which was built in 1908 at Prosper, Oregon, but which was home-ported much further north, at Astoria.

== Construction ==
Myrtle was built at Myrtle Point, Oregon, in 1909 for service on the Coquille River with the Myrtle Point Transportation Company. The steamer was 57.4 ft (17.50 m) long, with a beam of 13.8 ft (4.21 m) and depth of hold of 2.9 ft (0.88 m). The overall size of the vessel was 36 gross and 29 registered tons. Myrtle's engines generated 20 horsepower. Total crew specified in the U.S. steamship registry was two. The vessel was assigned U.S. registry no. 206743.

== Placed into service ==
On Monday, September 13, 1909, Myrtle was brought to Coquille for inspection. Some minor changes were anticipated, such as enlarging of the vessels wheel. Once these were effected, Myrtle's owners, Captain Panter, and, from Myrtle Point, Engineer Kimes, planned to place the vessel on the run from Myrtle Point to Coquille, replacing the steamer Echo, which needed to be withdrawn from service for repairs.

== Upper river navigation ==
On account of its small size, Myrtle was able to reach the extreme reaches of navigable waters on the Coquille River system. In December 1911, Myrtle, which normally ran between Coquille City and Myrtle Point, was able to reach Gravelford on the north fork of the Coquille River, at river mile 10, meaning 10 miles up river from the confluence of the north and south forks just downriver from Myrtle Point. In February 1918, Myrtle reached Fox Bridge, at river mile 14.3.

On the east fork of the Coquille River, which begins at river mile 10, that is, approximately Gravelford, Myrtle was able, in February 1918, to navigate to river mile 1.5 to carry a load of hay to the Weekly ranch.

The south fork of the Coquille River begins just below Myrtle Point and then continues in a general direction east. In December 1912, on the south fork of the Coquille, Myrtle was able to travel to river mile 10 on the south fork to pick up a load of dairy products from a creamery at Broadbent, Oregon.

In the 1970s and early 1980s, the operations of Myrtle were analyzed in terms of whether they, in conjunction with other evidence, rendered the tributaries of the Coquille River navigable and thus by law making them subject to the ownership of the State of Oregon. Myrtle's single trip to the creamery at Broadbent was found, by the report submitted to the state legislature, not itself sufficient evidence that the south fork of the Coquille was navigable.

== Stranding and court case ==
On the night of October 7, 1913, Myrtle and the sternwheeler Dora were pulled away from their mooring and severely damaged. Myrtle Point Transportation Company, the owner of the two vessels, sued the Port of Coquille for damages, alleging that slashings left up river had backed up the flow of water, so with the first rain a surge had come downriver, washing away the boom to which the boats had been moored, and depositing them on a jetty far downriver.

In 1915 the case came to trial before the Coos County Circuit Court, with Judge John S. Coke presiding. Trial took over three days and 41 witnesses testified. One witness who had seen the boom torn away stated that "the brush came down the river with such force and so high that it brushed the county bridge, 35 feet above the water and shook it." The transportation company claimed losses of $2,500, representing $1,000 in damage to the boats, $800 in repairs, and $700 in lost revenues from the boats when they were taken from their run.

The Port of Coquille alleged that the milling company's boom was too far out in the stream and that the boat company had been negligent in mooring their boats to the boom. The port also claimed the boat company was negligent by not posting a night watchman on the boats, and that had steam been kept up, the boats could have avoided being stranded on the jetty. The port also claimed that the lumber company's boom was defective.

The jury however on June 11, 1915, returned a verdict in favor of the boat company, and awarded damages against the Port of Coquille in the amount of $1,750. The port appealed, but the Supreme Court of Oregon ruled against them, finding that the evidence, evaluated in the light most favorable to the prevailing party, that is, the boat company, was sufficient to sustain the verdict.

== Fines for defective equipment ==
In September 1915, as part of a widespread effort by the steamboat inspection service to crack down on safety violations in the Coos Bay area, the owners of the steamer Myrtle (W.R. Panter, T.W. Panter, W.A. Panter, S. Hufford, and Elmer Hufford) were fined $10 for not having an endorsement for change of master for the vessel, $100 for no fog horn, and $100 for having a defective fire extinguisher on board. The occasion for the fines was the then recent (July 24, 1915) disaster in Chicago to the steamship Eastland, The possible remission of fines following compliance was not ruled out by the inspectors.

== Competition ==
Myrtle was opposed by the motor launch Charm, and had difficulty competing with the rival vessel.

== Sinking at the dock ==
In February 1921, Myrtle sank at a dock at Myrtle Point. On board was a cargo consisting of most of a rail car load of canned carrots. The sternwheeler Dora, then also owned by the Panter family doing business as the Myrtle Point Transportation Company, was sent to Myrtle Point to aid in the salvage of Myrtle and the cargo.

== Reconstruction ==
Myrtle, small vessel on lett, abandoned, circa 1941. On right is Telegraph, also abandoned.

In 1922, Myrtle reconstructed by being reduced in length by 7.0 ft (2.13 m) and converted to freight service. The conversion was done at the Herman Bros. yard at Prosper. For a time thereafter James W. Exon, of Portland, Oregon operated the vessel on the river.

== Disposition ==
Myrtle was abandoned along the bank of the Coquille River on the ranch of Paris Ward, one of the shareholders in the Myrtle Point Transportation Company.

== See also ==
- Steamboats of the Coquille River
