= Welcome (sternwheeler) =

American steamboat

- Welcome, circa 1904, somewhere on the Coquille River.

History
- Name: Welcome
- Port of registry: Coos Bay, Oregon
- Builder: S.H. McAdams, Coquille, Oregon
- In service: 1900
- Out of service: January 11, 1907
- Identification: U.S. 81707
- Fate: Broke loose from mooring during flood.

General characteristics
- Type: Inland passenger/freight
- Tonnage: 30 gross tons; 21 registered tons
- Length: 56 ft (17.07 m)
- Beam: 13.5 ft (4.11 m)
- Depth of hold: 2.8 ft (0.85 m)
- Decks: two
- Installed power: Twin steam engines, horizontally mounted
- Propulsion: Sternwheel

Welcome was a sternwheel steamboat that was operated on the Coquille River on the south Oregon coast from 1900 to 1907.

== Design, construction, and launch ==
Welcome was built at Coquille, Oregon, in 1900 by S.H. McAdams The steamer was 56 ft (17.07 m) long, with a beam of 13.5 ft (4.11 m) and depth of hold of 2.8 ft (0.85 m). The overall size of the vessel was 30 gross and 21 registered tons. Power was furnished by twin steam engines, each driving a pitman arm connected to a crankpin on the sternwheel.

== Service and route ==
Welcome was intended to be used for passenger service on the Coquille River. The route on the Coquille ran from Bandon on the coast, upriver to the county sea, Coquille, and then to Myrtle Point, which was near the head of navigation.

In 1901 only three steamers served on the river between Coquille and Myrtle Point, these were the propeller Reta (18 registered tons) the sternwheeler Echo (53 registered tons) and Welcome (21 registered tons). Between these three vessels they hauled 1,554 tons of freight upriver and 2,834 tons downriver. Upriver, the biggest single item was general merchandise, 800 tons. Downriver was almost entirely agricultural products, with the biggest single item being 1,035 tons of milk. 10,187 passengers were carried up and downriver.

== Stranding and rescue ==
On March 7, 1902, at 12:30 pm while en route to Bandon, Welcome became stranded on the north flats of the Coquille River during a very heavy squall, with the wind blowing at gale strength and a rough sea. The vessel was immediately spotted by the personnel at the Coquille River Life-Saving Station, who boarded the steamer and then passed a line to the steamer Favorite. Favorite however was not able to haul Welcome off the bank, and so the life-savers returned to the life-saving station in the surfboat, where they obtained an anchor, hawser, and cables, then rowed back to where Welcome was stranded. They rigged the anchor to Welcome, and that night, when the tide was high, hove the vessel off the bank without damage. Because the master of the Welcome was unfamiliar with the route, and the night was very dark, the keeper of the life-saving station piloted Welcome down to Bandon.

== Disposition ==
Welcome was stranded on January 11, 1907, at Myrtle Point and became a total loss. The vessel broke its mooring lines during high water, drifted into trees, and was damaged beyond repair.
