= Arago, Oregon =

Unincorporated community in the state of Oregon, United States

- Unincorporated community
- Location within the state of Oregon Arago (the United States)
- Coordinates: 43°06′07″N 124°11′32″W
- Country: United States
- State: Oregon
- County: Coos
- Elevation: 30 ft (9.1 m)
- Time zone: UTC-8 (Pacific (PST))
  - Summer (DST): UTC-7 (PDT)
- GNIS feature ID: 1117024

Arago is an unincorporated community in Coos County, Oregon, on the Coquille River, about 6 miles (10 km) south of Coquille. The area's elevation is 30 feet (9 m). The Coquille Rural Fire District provides firefighting services. The Coos County Sheriff and Myrtle Point police provide law enforcement services.

== History ==
The Arago post office was named for Cape Arago, which in turn was named for French physicist and geographer François Arago. The previously suggested name of Halls Prairie was disapproved by postal authorities.
