= Dora (sternwheeler) =

- Dora, somewhere on the Coquille River.

History
- Name: Dora
- Owner: Myrtle Point Transportation Company
- Builder: Herman Bros., Randolph, Oregon
- In service: 1910
- Out of service: 1927
- Identification: U.S. 208076
- Fate: Abandoned

General characteristics
- Type: Inland passenger/freight
- Tonnage: 77 gross tons; 64 registered tons
- Length: 70.3 ft (21.43 m)
- Beam: 15.8 ft (4.82 m)
- Depth of hold: 4.2 ft (1.28 m)
- Decks: two
- Installed power: Twin steam engines, horizontally mounted, 55 indicated horsepower
- Propulsion: Sternwheel

Dora was a sternwheel steamboat that was operated on the Coquille River on the southern coast of Oregon from 1912 to 1923. This vessel should not be confused with a number of other craft of the same name operating at the same time in other parts of North America.

== Design and construction ==
Dora was built at Randolph, Oregon in 1910 by the Herman Brothers. The steamer was 70.3 ft (21.43 m) long, with a beam of 15.8 ft (4.82 m) and depth of hold of 4.1 ft (1.25 m). The overall size of the vessel was 77 gross and 64 registered tons. Power was furnished by twin steam engines, each driving a pitman arm connected to a crankpin on the sternwheel, with 55 total indicated horsepower for both combined. Total required crew was shown as two.Dora was built for Russell Panter, who named the vessel after his daughter. Panter was doing business as the Myrtle Point Transportation Company.

== Service and route ==
Dora was intended to be used for passenger service on the Coquille River. Dora was placed on a route running from Bandon on the coast, to the county seat at Coquille and then upriver to Myrtle Point. Dora served this route in conjunction with the smaller sternwheeler, Myrtle, also owned by the Myrtle Point Transportation Company. Typical service included:

- On Friday, November 14, 1913, Dora transported about 20 residents of Bandon members of the Pythian Sisters to a meeting at Myrtle Point, Oregon.
- On Sunday, February 22, 1914, Dora transported several persons from Bandon to Prosper, Oregon to witness the launching of the sternwheeler Telegraph.

== Competition with rival vessels ==
In 1915, Dora came into fierce competition with the gasoline launch Charm. There was a collision between Dora and Charm, and the captains of the vessels, Willard, of Dora, and Panter, of Charm, each claimed the collision was the other's fault. Following the collision, the crews of the two vessels exchanged intemperate words, and someone was said to have thrown a gaspipe through a window on one of the vessels, while it was also claimed that someone had heaved a can of coal oil at the Dora. Someone concerned about passenger safety contacted Sheriff Johnson, who in turn referred the matter to the Steamboat Inspection Service. The inspectors instructed captains Willard and Panter to each submit written reports of the incident.

On February 3, 1915, following a two-day trial before inspectors Edwards and Fuller, the U.S. Steamboat Inspection Service suspended, for 20 months each, the licenses of Captains Walter Panter and Allen Panter, as well as that of engineer Wm. Panter, all of the Myrtle Point Transportation Company, as well as the licenses of Capt. O. R. Willard and engineer Elmer Willard, both of the Coquille River Company. Both the Panters and the Willards were barred from operating any vessel on the Coquille River or anywhere else.

== Loss of a crewman ==
On November 29, 1918, it was reported that Earl Randall, of Dundee, Oregon, a crewman on Dora, had been lost overboard during his course of duty and drowned. The incident occurred on the Coquille River near Riverton while the vessel was steaming towards Coquille. Randall was last seen walking through the engine room. The next thing that was noticed was his cries for help as he came up to the surface of the river from underwater. The vessel was reversed and a life ring was thrown, but it was too late. Randall's body was recovered two hours later.

== Salvage of Myrtle ==
Dora abandoned, June 21, 1941.

In February 1921, the small steamer Myrtle had sunk at a dock at Myrtle Point. On board Myrtle was a cargo consisting of most of a rail car load of canned carrots. Dora, then owned by the Panter family doing business as the Myrtle Point Transportation Company, was sent to Myrtle Point to aid in the salvage of Myrtle and the sunken vessel's cargo.

== Disposition ==
Dora was abandoned in 1927 along the bank of the Coquille River on the ranch of Paris Ward, one of the shareholders in the Myrtle Point Transportation Company.

== See also ==
- Steamboats of the Coquille River
