= Coquille River Light =

Lighthouse in Oregon, United States

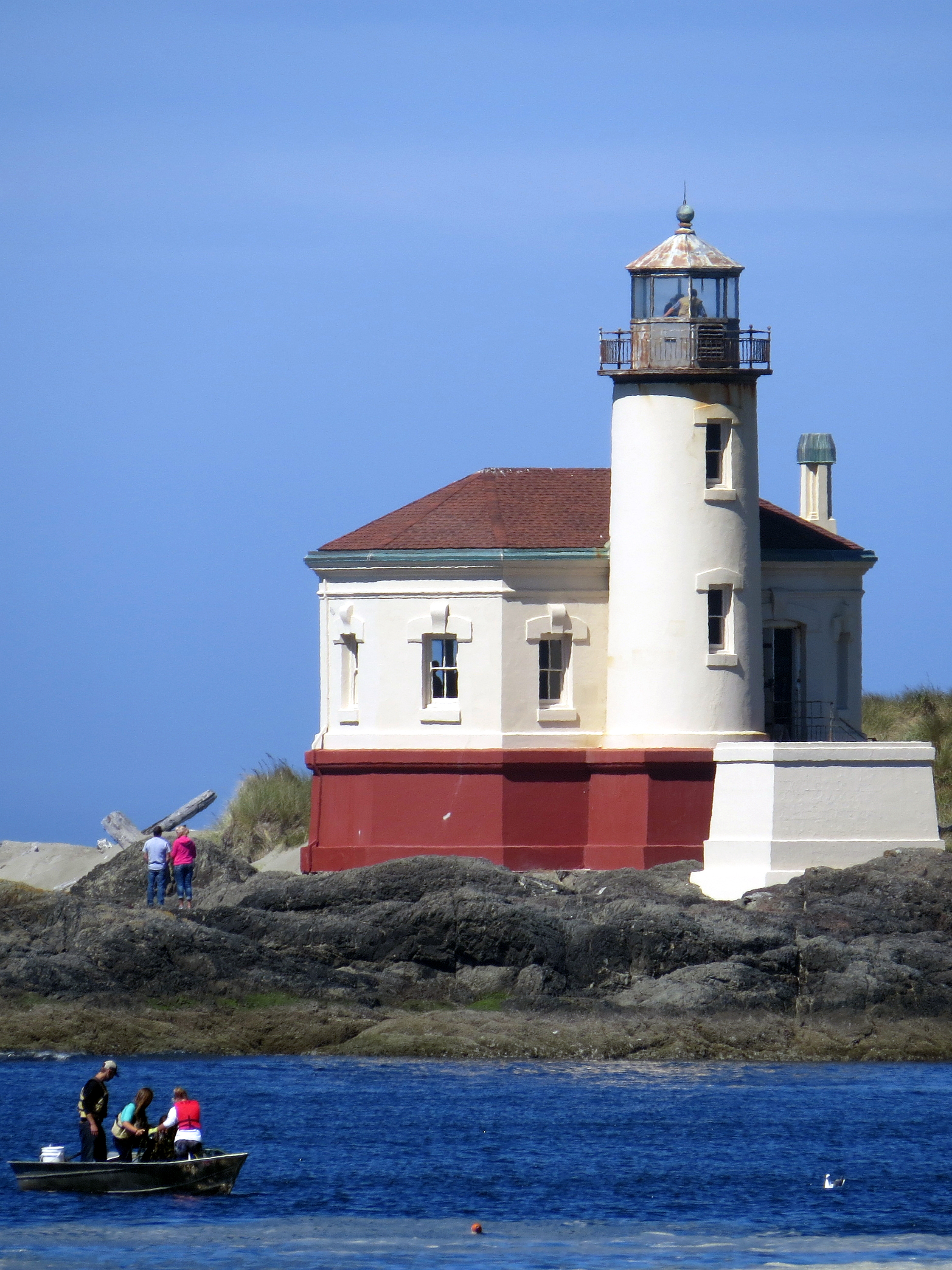
- Coquille River Light
- Location: Bandon, Oregon
- Coordinates: 43.123911°N 124.424222°W

Tower
- Constructed: 1895
- Foundation: Rock/concrete jetty
- Construction: Brick/stuccoed
- Height: 40 feet (12 m)
- Shape: Conical attached to signal building
- Markings: Red and white tower, black lantern
- Heritage: National Register of Historic Places listed place

Light
- First lit: 1896
- Deactivated: 1939
- Focal height: 47 feet (14 m)
- Lens: Fourth order Fresnel (original), Solar (1991)
- Range: 12 nautical miles (22 km; 14 mi) (formerly)
- Characteristic: 28 seconds on, 2 seconds off
- Coquille River Light
- U.S. National Register of Historic Places
- NRHP reference No.: 74001682
- Added to NRHP: March 22, 1974

Coquille River Light (formerly known as Bandon Light) is a lighthouse located near Bandon, Oregon, United States. It is currently maintained by the Oregon Parks and Recreation Department as a part of Bullards Beach State Park.

== History ==
Originally named Bandon Light, Coquille River Light was commissioned in 1895. First lit on February 29, 1896, the light guided mariners past the dangerous shifting sandbars into the Coquille River and harbor at Bandon. The light contained a fourth-order Fresnel lens and connected to the nearby keepers house by a wooden walkway. In September 1936, a large wildfire swept through the surrounding area, and destroyed most of Bandon. The town soon became bankrupt as a result of the decline in shipping. Coquille Light was shut down in 1939 and replaced by an automated light on the south jetty.

The light was originally built with a Daboll trumpet for its foghorn, which was used as the light's fog signal for several years. However, at certain times due to specific weather conditions, the sound of the trumpet would fail at sea, and in 1910 the trumpet was replaced by a more reliable fog siren. While mariners liked the new signal, many Bandon residents did not. The siren would eventually be removed along with the Fresnel lens after the light's decommissioning.

Over the next 37 years, the condition of the light deteriorated due to neglect and vandalism, until 1976, when its first major restoration began. However, by this time, the keepers quarters and other outbuildings had deteriorated past the point of repair, and were eventually removed. In 1991, a new solar powered light was installed in the tower. In the early 2000s, a new set of renovations was being done to the light as an ongoing project, estimated to finish sometime in 2011.

== Present day ==
The lighthouse is owned by the United States Army Corps of Engineers and has been leased by the Oregon Parks and Recreation Department since 2007. The lower level of the lighthouse is open to the public in the summer season. The tower, spiral staircase, and balcony are closed due to safety concerns.

== See also ==
- List of lighthouses on the Oregon Coast
- Steamboats of the Coquille River
- List of Oregon shipwrecks
