= Coos County Logging Museum =

Industrial museum in Oregon, US

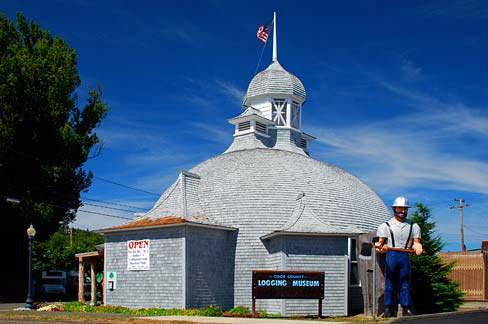
- Location: 705 Maple Street; Myrtle Point, Oregon, USA
- Coordinates: 43°03′51″N 124°08′24″W
- Type: Industrial museum
- Website: loggingmuseum.org
- Reorganized Church of Latter Day Saints
- U.S. National Register of Historic Places
- Area: 4,750 square feet (441 m^{2})
- Built: 1910
- Built by: Thomas Dickson, Charles McCracken
- Architect: Samuel Giles
- NRHP reference No.: 79002050
- Added to NRHP: October 18, 1979

The Coos County Logging Museum is museum in located in Myrtle Point, Oregon, United States. The museum's focus is the historical forest products industry, particularly logging specific to the local area of Coos County which is situated among vast forest preserves. The museum, a non-profit educational institution, is staffed entirely by volunteers, many of whom hail from the logging camps themselves.

The museum building is a shingled dome modeled after the Mormon Tabernacle in Salt Lake City, Utah. The building was listed on the National Register of Historic Places in 1979.

== See also ==
- National Register of Historic Places listings in Coos County, Oregon
