= Riverton, Oregon =

Unincorporated community in the state of Oregon, United States

- Unincorporated community
- Location within Oregon Location within the United States
- Coordinates: 43°09′26″N 124°16′28″W
- Country: United States
- State: Oregon
- County: Coos
- Elevation: 23 ft (7.0 m)
- Time zone: UTC-8 (Pacific (PST))
  - Summer (DST): UTC-7 (PDT)
- Area codes: 458 and 541
- GNIS feature ID: 1136691
- Coordinates and elevation from Geographic Names Information System

Riverton is an unincorporated community in Coos County, Oregon, United States, on Oregon Route 42S, about 12 miles (19 km) up the Coquille River from Bandon. Route 42S is the former alignment of U.S. Route 101.

The townsite of Riverton was platted in 1889. Riverton post office was established in 1890 and named for its situation on the river. Orlando A. Kelly, the first postmaster, was also said to have been the first settler there.

In 1915 Riverton had a population of 200. At that time Riverton shipped coal mined locally by steamboat to California. The first coal mine opened in the county in 1854 and up to a quarter of people worked in what was then the region's most important industry. Riverton served as a coal-mining center for more than 50 years. In 1940, Riverton's population was 150, and the place served as a trading center for farmers who grew peas. The post office closed in 1961. Formerly Riverton Ferry crossed the Coquille there and as of 1969, it was still being operated by the county. At one time the community had a high school and a grade school. Circa 1901, there was a Christian Church and today there is a Riverton Community Church unaffiliated with the former one. As of 2010 there are no stores in Riverton.

== See also ==
- Steamboats of the Coquille River
