= Favorite (steamboat) =

- Favorite

History
- Name: Favorite
- Port of registry: Coos Bay, Oregon, later Empire, Oregon
- Builder: Ellingson, Coquille, Oregon
- In service: 1901
- Identification: U.S. 121136

General characteristics
- Type: Inland passenger/freight
- Tonnage: 63 gross tons, 46 net tons
- Length: 72.4 ft (22.07 m)
- Beam: 13.6 ft (4.15 m)
- Depth: 4.2 ft (1.28 m) depth of hold
- Decks: two
- Installed power: Steam engine
- Propulsion: propeller
- Capacity: About 125 passengers

Favorite was a small steamboat that was operated on the Coquille River, Coos Bay and on the Siuslaw River, in the southern Oregon coast region from 1900 to 1918.

== Construction ==
Favorite was built in 1901 at Coquille at the yard of Arthur Ellingson (born 1875). Favorite was 72.4 ft (22.07 m) long, with a beam of 13.6 ft (4.15 m) and depth of hold of 4.3 ft (1.31 m),

The overall size of the vessel was 63 gross and 46 net tons. Favorite had two cabins and could carry about 125 passengers.

== Change in ownership ==
In May 1901, David Perkins and John Moomaw bought out W.R. Panter's interest in the river transportation business, which included the steamers Dispatch and Favorite. At that time, Favorite had been on the beach having its hull repainted. Once returned to service, Favorite was expected to be making a run from Coquille City to Bandon and back. Capt. Panter and his family were reported to be moving to their ranch downriver from Riverton.

== Attempted salvage of Welcome ==
On March 7, 1902, at 12:30 pm while en route to Bandon, the sternwheel steamer Welcome became stranded on the north flats of the Coquille River during a very heavy squall, with the wind blowing at gale strength and a rough sea. The grounded vessel was immediately spotted by the personnel at the Coquille River Life-Saving Station, who boarded the steamer and then passed a line to the steamer Favorite. Favorite however was not able to haul Welcome off the bank. This was effected the following night by the life-saving crew with the use of an anchor, hawser, and cables.

== Grounding ==
On November 9, 1907, Favorite grounded on a tide flat just upriver from Bandon. The sternwheeler Liberty made the trip in its place.

== Return and resignation of Captain Willard ==
On July 23, 1907, it was reported that Capt. Ott Willard would return as master of Favorite, which he had formerly commanded. On November 12, 1907, Captain Willard gave notice that he would resign as master of Favorite to take charge of a new gasoline-powered boat that he was having built at the yard of Max Timmerman in Coos Bay. (This was probably Wolverine.) Once built, Willard intended to place it on the run from Bandon to Coquille under his own command.

== Sunk at mooring ==
Favorite being raised after sinking

On the night of February 5, 1908, while tied to a dock at Coquille, Oregon, Favorite filled up with water and sank. The next morning there was nothing visible of the steamer except the smokestack rising clear of the water. The value of the vessel at the time was estimated to have been about $4,500. At the time, Favorite was owned by the Coquille River Steamboat Company and was run under the command of Captain Ross. The cause for the sinking was said to be a defective hull, and the vessel was reportedly in need of repair. The sternwheeler Liberty, which had been running with the Favorite would be the only boat on the run between Bandon and Coquille until Favorite could be raised and repaired, or a new boat brought onto the route.

On February 18, 1908, it was reported that Favorite had been raised. While the cause of the accident had not been determined by then, it was supposed that somehow the gunwale of the steamer had been caught under the beams supporting wharf floor, and as the river rose, the vessel was trapped and pushed under the water. Favorite had sunk on a Friday, but with the use of jackscrews, and the aid of the tug Triumph and a scow, by Sunday evening, Favorite had been raised sufficiently high above the water for a fire to be raised in the boiler. It was estimated that Favorite could be returned to service within a few days after repairs could be effected.

== Route in 1908 ==
Favorite at Coquille City, circa 1908. Motor vessel Wolverine visible on left, steam schooner Wilhelmina visible on right.

From August 6, 1908, to March 3, 1910, Favorite was running on the following schedule on the Coquille River set by its owners, the Coquille River Transportation Company: two trips a day running between Bandon and Coquille City, departing from Bandon at 6:45 am, and 1:20 p.m, and departing from Coquille City at 9:15 am and at 4:00 p.m.

This schedule was claimed to allow travellers from Bandon to meet all trains connecting with Marshfield (the former name of Coos Bay). It also permitted travellers from Marshfield to leave on a Coquille-bound train in the morning and reach Bandon by noon. Persons from the Coquille river could be picked up by the steamer, transfer at Coquille City on to a Marshfield-bound train, and spend three hours in Marshfield before having to return to Coquille City.

== Transfer ==
In 1908 or 1909, Favorite was transferred to Coos Bay. On January 20, 1910, it was reported that Favorite would be transferred from service on Coos Bay north to the Siuslaw River where it would be run between Florence and Mapleton, Oregon under the command of Capt. Ludwig Christensen.

In a comprehensive list of the steamboats operating on the Coquille River published November 29, 1915, Favorite was not listed as being in service. Favorite was listed on the Merchant Vessel Register for the fiscal year ending June 30, 1915, with its home port shown as Empire, Oregon.

== Disposition ==
Final disposition of Favorite is not known. The boat was last on the Merchant Vessel Registry for the fiscal year ending June 30, 1918.

== See also ==
- Steamboats of the Coquille River
