= Prosper, Oregon =

Unincorporated community in the state of Oregon, United States

- Unincorporated community
- Location within the state of Oregon Prosper (the United States)
- Coordinates: 43°08′50″N 124°22′25″W
- Country: United States
- State: Oregon
- County: Coos
- Elevation: 13 ft (4.0 m)
- Time zone: UTC-8 (Pacific (PST))
  - Summer (DST): UTC-7 (PDT)
- GNIS feature ID: 1136660

Prosper is an unincorporated community in Coos County, Oregon, United States. It is about 3 miles (5 km) northwest of Bandon next to the Coquille River. There is no longer a town at the site.

The first cannery on the Coquille River was started in about 1882 by D. H. Getchell in what came to be known as Prosper. Prosper was founded in the summer of 1892 by Adam Pershbaker, who built a sawmill and a shipyard there. The Emil Heuckendorff shipyard was established soon after. Prosper had a post office from 1893 until 1928; Pershbaker was the first postmaster. The name was likely chosen in the hope the locality would be prosperous. In 1915, Prosper's population was 500, and it had two salmon canneries, and two shingle and saw mills. Passenger boats traveled three times a day to Bandon and Coquille.

== See also ==
- Steamboats of the Coquille River
