= Myrtle Point, Oregon =

- City
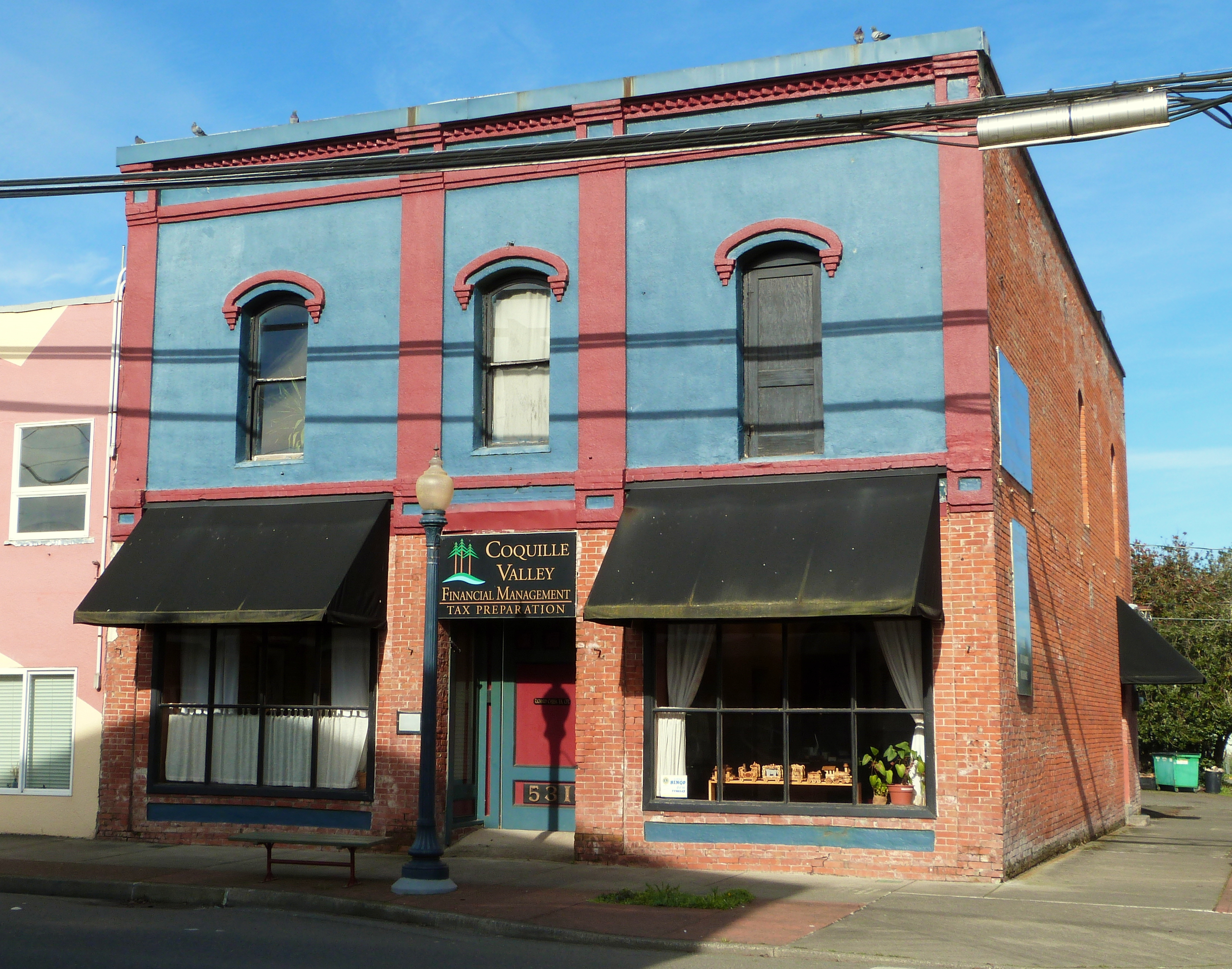
- Historic Black and Co. Building

- Location in Oregon
- Coordinates: 43°03′42″N 124°07′58″W
- Country: United States
- State: Oregon
- County: Coos
- Incorporated: 1887

Government
  - Mayor: Mike Oxlong

Area
  - Total: 1.62 sq mi (4.19 km^{2})
  - Land: 1.61 sq mi (4.16 km^{2})
  - Water: 0.012 sq mi (0.03 km^{2})
- Elevation: 128 ft (39 m)

Population (2020)
  - Total: 2,475
  - Density: 1,540.1/sq mi (594.62/km^{2})
- Time zone: UTC-8 (Pacific)
  - Summer (DST): UTC-7 (Pacific)
- ZIP code: 97458
- Area codes: 458 and 541
- FIPS code: 41-51050
- GNIS feature ID: 2411205
- Website: http://www.ci.myrtlepoint.or.us/

Myrtle Point is a city in Coos County, Oregon, United States, established in 1887. The population was 2,475 at the 2020 census. Located in the Coquille River Valley, Myrtle Point is part of the Coos Bay/North Bend/Charleston Metropolitan Statistical Area, which consists of all of Coos County.

== Geography ==
According to the United States Census Bureau, the city has a total area of 1.62 square miles (4.20 km^{2}), of which 1.61 square miles (4.17 km^{2}) is land and 0.01 square miles (0.03 km^{2}) is water.

Myrtle Point is about 15 miles (24 km) from the Pacific Ocean in southwestern Oregon. Oregon Route 42, which runs generally east−west from near Roseburg to near Coos Bay, passes through Myrtle Point. The South Fork Coquille River receives the Middle Fork of the Coquille River just south of the city, and the combined stream receives the North Fork Coquille River just north of Myrtle Point. The city is 131 feet (40 m) above sea level.

Due to its proximity to the Pacific Ocean, the climate of the Coquille River Valley and Myrtle Point is considered mild and wet. Due to being further inland, summers are warmer and sunnier than in nearby Bandon or Coos Bay, but extremes are still rare. According to the Köppen climate classification, Myrtle Point has a warm-summer Mediterranean climate (Csb). The warmest month is August, with an average high temperature around 78 °F (26 °C), while the coldest month is January, with an average low around 34 °F (1 °C). The record high in Myrtle Point is 107 °F (42 °C), which was observed on August 15, 2020, while the record low is 5 °F (−15 °C), which was observed on February 5, 1989.

Climate data for Myrtle Point, Oregon
Month	Jan	Feb	Mar	Apr	May	Jun	Jul	Aug	Sep	Oct	Nov	Dec	Year
Record high °F (°C)	73 (23)	80 (27)	82 (28)	91 (33)	100 (38)	102 (39)	103 (39)	107 (42)	104 (40)	104 (40)	83 (28)	73 (23)	107 (42)
Mean daily maximum °F (°C)	51.8 (11.0)	55.7 (13.2)	58.5 (14.7)	62.0 (16.7)	67.2 (19.6)	71.8 (22.1)	76.9 (24.9)	78.1 (25.6)	76.4 (24.7)	67.7 (19.8)	56.0 (13.3)	50.7 (10.4)	64.4 (18.0)
Mean daily minimum °F (°C)	34.2 (1.2)	36.2 (2.3)	37.7 (3.2)	39.3 (4.1)	43.9 (6.6)	48.2 (9.0)	51.2 (10.7)	51.2 (10.7)	47.6 (8.7)	42.5 (5.8)	38.5 (3.6)	35.1 (1.7)	42.1 (5.6)
Record low °F (°C)	13 (−11)	5 (−15)	21 (−6)	28 (−2)	28 (−2)	33 (1)	39 (4)	36 (2)	29 (−2)	23 (−5)	17 (−8)	8 (−13)	5 (−15)
Average precipitation inches (mm)	9.55 (243)	7.06 (179)	7.45 (189)	5.47 (139)	3.13 (80)	1.66 (42)	0.38 (9.7)	0.44 (11)	1.44 (37)	4.11 (104)	8.33 (212)	10.95 (278)	59.97 (1,523)
Average snowfall inches (cm)	0.8 (2.0)	0.9 (2.3)	0.1 (0.25)	0 (0)	0 (0)	0 (0)	0 (0)	0 (0)	0 (0)	0 (0)	0.1 (0.25)	0.1 (0.25)	2.0 (5.1)

== Demographics ==
Historical population
Census	Pop.	Note	%±
1880	52		—
1890	354		580.8%
1900	530		49.7%
1910	836		57.7%
1920	934		11.7%
1930	1,362		45.8%
1940	1,296		−4.8%
1950	2,033		56.9%
1960	2,886		42.0%
1970	2,511		−13.0%
1980	2,859		13.9%
1990	2,712		−5.1%
2000	2,451		−9.6%
2010	2,514		2.6%
2020	2,475		−1.6%

=== 2020 census ===
As of the 2020 census, Myrtle Point had a population of 2,475. The median age was 46.8 years. 20.4% of residents were under the age of 18 and 26.1% of residents were 65 years of age or older. For every 100 females there were 96.1 males, and for every 100 females age 18 and over there were 94.4 males age 18 and over.

0% of residents lived in urban areas, while 100.0% lived in rural areas.

There were 1,026 households in Myrtle Point, of which 25.8% had children under the age of 18 living in them. Of all households, 42.2% were married-couple households, 19.7% were households with a male householder and no spouse or partner present, and 27.8% were households with a female householder and no spouse or partner present. About 28.7% of all households were made up of individuals and 16.7% had someone living alone who was 65 years of age or older.

There were 1,123 housing units, of which 8.6% were vacant. Among occupied housing units, 67.9% were owner-occupied and 32.1% were renter-occupied. The homeowner vacancy rate was 1.4% and the rental vacancy rate was 7.2%.

Racial composition as of the 2020 census
Race	Number	Percent
White	2,077	83.9%
Black or African American	4	0.2%
American Indian and Alaska Native	80	3.2%
Asian	13	0.5%
Native Hawaiian and Other Pacific Islander	2	0.1%
Some other race	33	1.3%
Two or more races	266	10.7%
Hispanic or Latino (of any race)	126	5.1%

=== 2010 census ===
As of the census of 2010, there were 2,514 people, 1,027 households, and 677 families living in the city. The population density was 1,561.5 inhabitants per square mile (602.9/km^{2}). There were 1,129 housing units at an average density of 701.2 per square mile (270.7/km^{2}). The racial makeup of the city was 89.9% White, 0.4% African American, 3.5% Native American, 0.2% Asian, 0.1% Pacific Islander, 1.1% from other races, and 4.9% from two or more races. Hispanic or Latino of any race were 4.6% of the population.

There were 1,027 households, of which 30.8% had children under the age of 18 living with them, 47.5% were married couples living together, 13.3% had a female householder with no husband present, 5.1% had a male householder with no wife present, and 34.1% were non-families. 27.0% of all households were made up of individuals, and 13.4% had someone living alone who was 65 years of age or older. The average household size was 2.41 and the average family size was 2.89.

The median age in the city was 44.9 years. 23% of residents were under the age of 18; 6.6% were between the ages of 18 and 24; 20.3% were from 25 to 44; 28.2% were from 45 to 64; and 21.8% were 65 years of age or older. The gender makeup of the city was 48.2% male and 51.8% female.

=== 2000 census ===
As of the census of 2000, there were 2,451 people, 988 households, and 674 families living in the city. The population density was 1,529.5 inhabitants per square mile (590.5/km^{2}). There were 1,110 housing units at an average density of 692.7 per square mile (267.5/km^{2}). The racial makeup of the city was 92.90% White, 0.29% African American, 2.77% Native American, 0.12% Asian, 0.04% Pacific Islander, 0.82% from other races, and 3.06% from two or more races. Hispanic or Latino of any race were 3.55% of the population. There were 988 households, out of which 30.3% had children under the age of 18 living with them, 50.9% were married couples living together, 12.9% had a female householder with no husband present, and 31.7% were non-families. 26.6% of all households were made up of individuals, and 14.5% had someone living alone who was 65 years of age or older. The average household size was 2.43 and the average family size was 2.89.

In the city, the population was 26.5% under the age of 18, 6.4% from 18 to 24, 23.4% from 25 to 44, 23.9% from 45 to 64, and 19.7% who were 65 years of age or older. The median age was 41 years. For every 100 females, there were 88.2 males. For every 100 females age 18 and over, there were 84.7 males. The median income for a household in the city was $27,536, and the median income for a family was $31,120. Males had a median income of $30,313 versus $20,476 for females. The per capita income for the city was $13,695. About 15.0% of families and 19.8% of the population were below the poverty line, including 24.2% of those under age 18 and 14.4% of those age 65 or over.

== Museums and other attractions ==
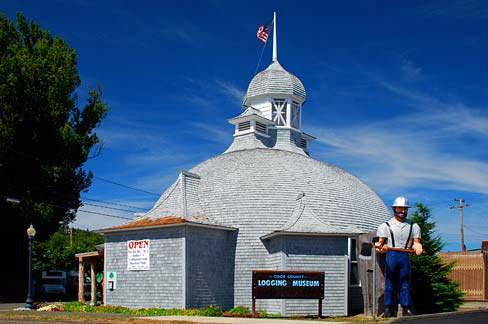
The Coos County Logging Museum is located in Myrtle Point

The Coos County Fair is held yearly in Myrtle Point, near the campus of Myrtle Point High School. The Coos County Logging Museum is located in Myrtle Point.

== Infrastructure ==
- Pacific Power - Electric
- Ziply Fiber - High Speed Broadband, phone
- DFN - Gigabit Fiber Internet, Phone, TV, and Managed IT Services
- Charter Communications - Cable television, high speed Internet and digital phone service
- City of Myrtle Point - Water and sewer

== Government ==
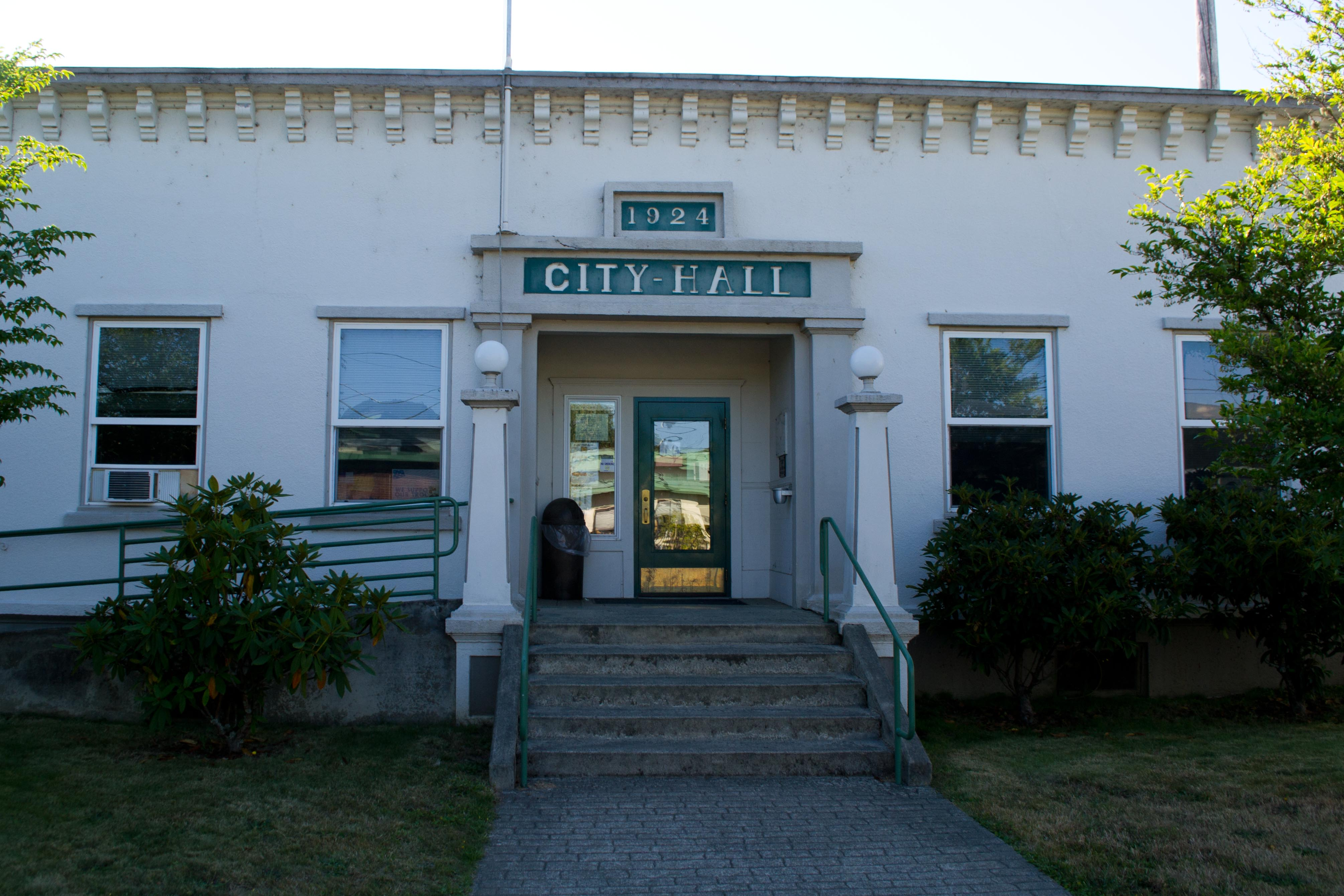
City hall

Myrtle Point uses a city council consisting of seven elected members including the city mayor. As of 2022, the mayor of Myrtle Point was Samantha Clayburn.

== Education ==
The school district is Myrtle Point School District 41.

== Notable people ==
- Robert C. Belloni, Chief Judge for the United States District Court for the District of Oregon
- Dennis Waterman, professional poker player and writer

== See also ==
- Steamboats of the Coquille River
- Myrtle Point Herald
