= Coquille River (Oregon) =

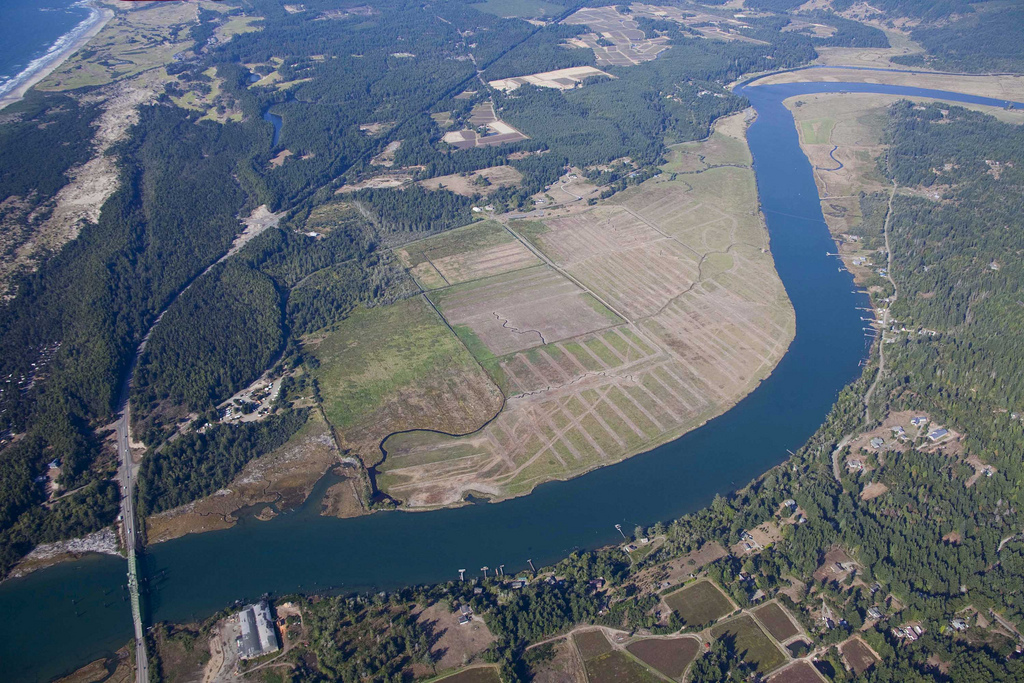
- Aerial view of the Coquille near its mouth

- Location of the mouth of the Coquille River in Oregon

Location
- Country: United States
- State: Oregon
- County: Coos

Physical characteristics
- Source: Southern Oregon Coast Range
  - location: Myrtle Point
  - coordinates: 43°04′49″N 124°08′28″W
  - elevation: 17 ft (5.2 m)
- Mouth: Pacific Ocean
  - location: Bandon, Oregon
  - coordinates: 43°07′25″N 124°25′48″W
  - elevation: 0 ft (0 m)
- Length: 36.3 mi (58.4 km)
- Basin size: 1,059 sq mi (2,740 km^{2})
- Discharge
  - average: 4,526 cu ft/s (128.2 m^{3}/s)

The Coquille River /koʊˈkiːl/ is a stream, about 36 miles (58 km) long, in southwestern Oregon in the United States. It drains a mountainous area of 1,059 square miles (2,740 km^{2}) of the Southern Oregon Coast Range into the Pacific Ocean. Its watershed is between that of the Coos River to the north and the Rogue River to the south.

== Course ==
The river, formed by the confluence of its north and south forks, begins at Myrtle Point. The North Fork Coquille River, about 53 miles (85 km) long), rises in northern Coos County and flows southwest. The East Fork Coquille River, about 34 miles (55 km) long, rises in eastern Coos County, and flows generally west to join the North Fork.

The South Fork, about 63 miles (101 km) long, rises in southern Coos County, north of the Wild Rogue Wilderness Area, and flows generally north. It receives the Middle Fork Coquille River, about 40 miles (64 km) long, then joins the North Fork from the south at Myrtle Point. The combined river meanders generally west, past Coquille. It enters the Pacific at Bandon, about 20 miles (32 km) north of Cape Blanco. Just before emptying in the Pacific, it is crossed by US Route 101 via a relatively small drawbridge called Bullards Bridge.

=== Tributaries ===
Named tributaries of the Coquille River from source to mouth are the North Fork and South Fork followed by Grady, Hall, Gray, Fishtrap, Glen Aiken, Pulaski, Rink, Fat Elk, Calloway, and China creeks. Next come Beaver, Iowa, and Hatchet sloughs followed by Alder, Lampa, Lowe, and Bear creeks. Further downstream Offield Creek enters via Randolph Slough. Then come Sevenmile and Fahys creeks followed by Peterson Gulch. Below that are Spring, Simpson, and Ferry creeks.

== Tidal effect ==
The Coquille River is a tidal-effect river. During high tides at sea, the water at the mouth of the river acts like a dam, impeding the flow of the stream. More water always flows out into the ocean than enters with the tide; however, logs, sticks, and leaves on the surface can float upriver at certain times of day. There is a time lag between the high tide at sea and the effect pushing upstream. This varies according to the number of miles from the ocean. The tidal-effect is observed as far as Myrtle Point, some 28 to 30 miles (45 to 48 km) upriver. The head of tide is 41 miles (66 km) upriver from the mouth at Bandon. But some salt water does enter across the bar. The salt water intrusion was once minor. Today, however, sometimes traces of salinity appear only a few miles below the town of Coquille. This phenomenon affects industry along the river, as mills and other sites need fresh water intakes on the river in order not to rust or damage equipment or affect production processes.

On its main forks, the Coquille is also an alluvial river valley, meaning it was once a drowned river valley—a lake, or perhaps a much wider river, with a sandy bottom. The soil in the valley is very fertile. However, the rise and fall of the water level, and flooding in winter, prevent ordinary types of farming. A lush grass grows in the valley lowlands which can survive either drought or inundation. Tide-gates along the river can bring in water when needed. On this sweeping stand of grass, in summer many cattle find pasture.

Oregon Water Resources Department Watermaster District 19 covers the Coquille River system.

== History ==
In its natural state, the Coquille River meandered widely at its mouth. Owing to storms, tides, or other conditions, the river could empty into the sea as far north as a beach now called Whiskey Run, or as far south as a rock formation called Table Rock—an overall distance of several miles. It is said that when early sailing vessels tried to cross the dangerous bar to return to the port at Bandon, the main channel might have moved, or shoaled in, at the very place the ships had crossed safely on the outgoing journey.

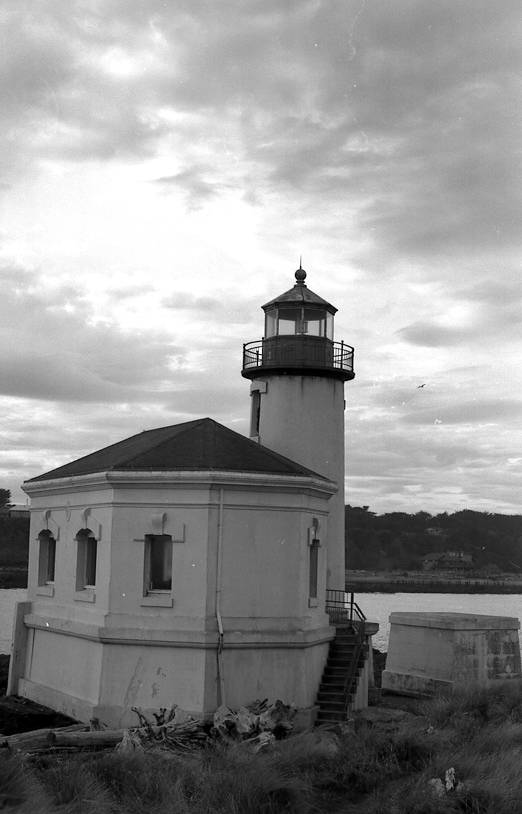
Coquille River Lighthouse

Captain Judah Parker, a sea captain, built a jetty of bunches of cedar branches wrapped in burlap, sunken into the mud. Rocks were added. In the late 1890s, the government built jetties to force the channel to stay put. Huge boulders for the South Jetty, at Bandon, came from the blasting of a nearby mound of rock called Tupper Rock. The North Jetty is across the river, and clearly visible from the south jetty.

The Coquille River Lighthouse, commissioned in 1896, guided mariners to find the dangerous bar at the mouth of the Coquille. The lighthouse was built on or near Rackleff Rock, a rocky obstacle in the channel. The rock became part of the bulwark of the North Jetty area. The lighthouse was decommissioned in 1939, following the last of improvements to the river channel.

The pioneer Hamblock and Bullards families had ranches in that region. But eventually their lands became part of the present Bullards Beach State Park. The old lighthouse building still stands. It is now a tourist attraction.

== Literary setting ==
In his early science fiction book The Begum's Millions, Jules Verne depicted a fictional Utopian community named Ville-France being created in 1872 at the Coquille River's confluence with the Pacific, slightly south-west of the actual site of Bandon.

== See also ==
- List of rivers of Oregon
- List of longest streams of Oregon
- Menai Strait#Tidal effects
- Firth (tidal effects)
- Steamboats of the Coquille River
