= National Register of Historic Places listings in Coos County, Oregon =

Location of Coos County in Oregon

This list presents the full set of buildings, structures, objects, sites, or districts designated on the National Register of Historic Places in Coos County, Oregon, United States, and offers brief descriptive information about each of them. The National Register recognizes places of national, state, or local historic significance across the United States. Out of over 90,000 National Register sites nationwide, Oregon is home to over 2,000, and 55 of those are found in Coos County.

This National Park Service list is complete through NPS recent listings posted August 28, 2026.

== Current listings ==
	Name on the Register	Image	Date listed	Location	City or town	Description
1	35-CS-130–The Osprey Site		March 6, 2001 (#01000131)	Address restricted	North Bend	This archaeological site associated with the Coquille people is the largest known complex of fishing weirs on the Oregon coast, encompassing over 3000 identified wooden weir stakes organized into 25 discrete weir features. Radiocarbon dating suggests the site was in use possibly as early as 560 to 670 CE, and historic accounts indicate it continued in use into the 1850s.
2	Edwin and Ethel Abernethy House	Edwin and Ethel Abernethy House	September 22, 1988 (#88001532)	Box 103, Sitkum Route; 43°09′28″N 123°57′42″W	Myrtle Point vicinity	
3	Archeological Site 35CS129		September 10, 1997 (#97001031)	Address restricted	Charleston	
4	Archeological Site 35CS24		September 10, 1997 (#97001029)	Address restricted	North Bend	
5	Archeological Site 35CS39		September 10, 1997 (#97001036)	Address restricted	Charleston	
6	Archeological Site 35CS66		September 10, 1997 (#97001034)	Address restricted	Charleston	
7	Archeological Site 35CS67		September 10, 1997 (#97001033)	Address restricted	Charleston	
8	Archeological Site 35CS8		September 10, 1997 (#97001040)	Address restricted	Bandon	
9	Archeological Site 35CS9		September 10, 1997 (#97001039)	Address restricted	Bandon	
10	A. H. Black and Company Building	A. H. Black and Company Building	October 25, 1990 (#90001586)	531 Spruce St. 43°03′54″N 124°08′28″W	Myrtle Point	
11	Breuer Building	Breuer Building	October 2, 1992 (#92001308)	460 1st Street SW; 43°07′15″N 124°25′06″W	Bandon	
12	Bullards Beach Site		September 10, 1997 (#97001037)	Address restricted	Bandon	
13	Cape Arago Lighthouse	Cape Arago Lighthouse	May 13, 1993 (#73002338)	Gregory Point, north of Cape Arago and about 2 miles (3.2 km) southwest of Coos Bay entrance 43°20′28″N 124°22′31″W	Charleston	
14	Cape Arago Site (35CS10)	Cape Arago Site (35CS10)	September 10, 1997 (#97001035)	Address restricted	Charleston	
15	Leo J. Cary House	Leo J. Cary House	October 14, 1992 (#92001317)	572 E. 1st St. 43°10′30″N 124°10′59″W	Coquille	
16	Chandler Hotel and Annex	Chandler Hotel and Annex	June 14, 1984 (#84002966)	187 Central Ave. 43°22′04″N 124°12′50″W	Coos Bay	
17	J. S. Coke Building	J. S. Coke Building	February 20, 1991 (#91000048)	150 Central Ave. 43°22′05″N 124°12′50″W	Coos Bay	
18	Coos Bay Bridge No. 01823	Coos Bay Bridge No. 01823	August 5, 2005 (#05000817)	OR Coast 9, US101, MP233.99; 43°25′44″N 124°13′18″W	North Bend	
19	Coos Bay Carnegie Library	Coos Bay Carnegie Library	February 27, 1986 (#86000297)	515 Market Ave. 43°22′09″N 124°13′02″W	Coos Bay	
20	Coos Bay National Bank Building	Coos Bay National Bank Building	October 30, 1989 (#89001868)	201 Central Ave. 43°22′04″N 124°12′52″W	Coos Bay	Completed in 1924, this building is an outstanding example of Beaux-Arts eclecticism with a Classical theme by the firm of Tourtellotte and Hummel. Coos Bay National Bank, headquartered here until 1956, played a leading role in the development of Coos Bay during the period between the world wars and in the city's emergence as a major lumber port.
21	Coquille City Hall	Coquille City Hall	October 14, 1992 (#92001318)	99 E. 2nd St. 43°10′33″N 124°11′18″W	Coquille	
22	Coquille River Life Boat Station	Coquille River Life Boat Station	August 3, 1984 (#84002969)	390 1st Street SW; 43°07′14″N 124°25′05″W	Bandon	
23	Coquille River Light	Coquille River Light	March 22, 1974 (#74001682)	Bullard's Beach State Park; 43°07′26″N 124°25′27″W	Bandon	
24	Egyptian Theatre	Egyptian Theatre	May 24, 2010 (#10000281)	229 S. Broadway; 43°22′00″N 124°12′49″W	Coos Bay	
25	First National Bank of Bandon	First National Bank of Bandon	June 24, 2015 (#15000373)	112 2nd Street SE; 43°07′08″N 124°24′52″W	Bandon	
26	John Neal and Dora Gearhart House		August 12, 1999 (#99001003)	Address restricted	Myrtle Point	
27	Judge Lintner Harlocker House	Judge Lintner Harlocker House	October 14, 1992 (#92001315)	18 S. Collier St. 43°10′25″N 124°11′08″W	Coquille	
28	Hotel North Bend	Hotel North Bend	August 30, 2005 (#05000932)	768 Virginia St. 43°24′24″N 124°13′28″W	North Bend	
29	Hub Department Store Building	Hub Department Store Building	October 2, 1992 (#92001307)	125 Central Ave. 43°22′04″N 124°12′48″W	Coos Bay	
30	Koski Building	Koski Building	January 21, 1994 (#93001509)	241 N. Broadway; 43°22′08″N 124°12′48″W	Coos Bay	
31	Liberty Theatre	Liberty Theatre	June 9, 2023 (#100009056)	2100 Sherman Ave. 43°24′18″N 124°13′27″W	North Bend	
32	Marshfield City Hall	Marshfield City Hall	February 21, 1997 (#97000125)	375 Central Ave. 43°22′04″N 124°12′57″W	Coos Bay	
33	Marshfield Elks Temple	Marshfield Elks Temple	May 19, 1983 (#83002146)	195 S. 2nd St. 43°22′03″N 124°12′50″W	Coos Bay	
34	Marshfield Hotel	Marshfield Hotel	March 22, 1984 (#84002971)	275 Broadway; 43°22′09″N 124°12′48″W	Coos Bay	
35	Marshfield I.O.O.F. Cemetery	Marshfield I.O.O.F. Cemetery	August 7, 2012 (#12000483)	750 Ingersoll Ave. 43°21′36″N 124°13′12″W	Coos Bay	
36	Marshfield Sun Printing Plant	Marshfield Sun Printing Plant	March 21, 1973 (#73001574)	1049 N. Front St. 43°22′28″N 124°12′44″W	Coos Bay	
37	Mingus Park Community Building		May 16, 2025 (#100011838)	850 W Park Roadway (previously 910 W Park Roadway); 43°22′20″N 124°13′24″W	Coos Bay	
38	Mussell Reef Village		September 10, 1997 (#97001030)	Address restricted	Charleston	
39	Myrtle Arms Apartment Building	Myrtle Arms Apartment Building	October 31, 1985 (#85003478)	613 Central Ave. 43°22′04″N 124°13′06″W	Coos Bay	
40	Nasburg–Lockhart House	Nasburg–Lockhart House	December 2, 1985 (#85003038)	687 N. 3rd St. 43°22′19″N 124°12′54″W	Coos Bay	
41	Hjalte Nerdrum House	Hjalte Nerdrum House	May 27, 1993 (#93000435)	955 S. 5th St. 43°21′32″N 124°13′05″W	Coos Bay	
42	Nerdrum–Conrad House	Nerdrum–Conrad House	June 16, 2004 (#04000616)	979 S. 5th St. 43°21′30″N 124°13′05″W	Coos Bay	
43	Captain Bror W. Olsson House	Captain Bror W. Olsson House	November 2, 1986 (#86002905)	631 S. 10th St. 43°21′47″N 124°13′20″W	Coos Bay	
44	John E. and Christina Paulson House	John E. and Christina Paulson House	August 11, 1983 (#83002147)	86 N. Dean St. 43°10′29″N 124°11′04″W	Coquille	
45	Philpott Site (35 CS 1)		October 18, 1979 (#79002049)	Address restricted	Bandon	
46	Reorganized Church of Latter Day Saints	Reorganized Church of Latter Day Saints	October 18, 1979 (#79002050)	705 Maple St. 43°03′51″N 124°08′24″W	Myrtle Point	
47	Running Foxe Midden (35CS131)		September 10, 1997 (#97001038)	Address restricted	Bandon	
48	St. James Episcopal Church	St. James Episcopal Church	October 14, 1992 (#92001316)	210 E. 3rd St. 43°10′38″N 124°11′12″W	Coquille	
49	Samuels Site (35CS138)		September 10, 1997 (#97001032)	Address restricted	Charleston	
50	Sandy Creek Bridge	Sandy Creek Bridge	November 29, 1979 (#79002051)	Sandy Creek Rd. 43°00′23″N 123°53′30″W	Remote	
51	Seelig–Byler House	Seelig–Byler House	January 21, 1994 (#93001510)	1920 N. 14th St. 43°22′54″N 124°13′38″W	Coos Bay	
52	A. J. Sherwood House	A. J. Sherwood House	October 14, 1992 (#92001314)	257 E. Main St. 43°10′25″N 124°11′11″W	Coquille	
53	Maj. Morton Tower House	Maj. Morton Tower House	October 31, 1985 (#85003453)	486 Schetter Ave. 43°23′39″N 124°16′31″W	Coos Bay	
54	Tower–Flanagan House	Tower–Flanagan House	February 16, 1984 (#84002976)	476 Newmark Ave. 43°23′35″N 124°16′35″W	Coos Bay	
55	Tribal Hall of the Confederated Tribes of Coos, Lower Umpqua and Siuslaw Indians	Tribal Hall of the Confederated Tribes of Coos, Lower Umpqua and Siuslaw Indians	March 29, 1989 (#89000202)	338 Wallace St. 43°23′19″N 124°15′57″W	Coos Bay	

== Former listing ==
	Name on the Register	Image	Date listed	Date removed	Location	City or town	Description
1	Powers Hotel		June 5, 1986 (#86001216)	December 24, 2008	310 2nd Ave. 42°52′47″N 124°04′11″W	Powers	Destroyed by fire on January 1, 2009.

== See also ==
- National Register of Historic Places listings in Oregon
- Listings in neighboring counties: Curry, Douglas
- Historic preservation
- History of Oregon
- Lists of Oregon-related topics
