= Coos Bay Wagon Road =

Pioneer road in Oregon, U.S.

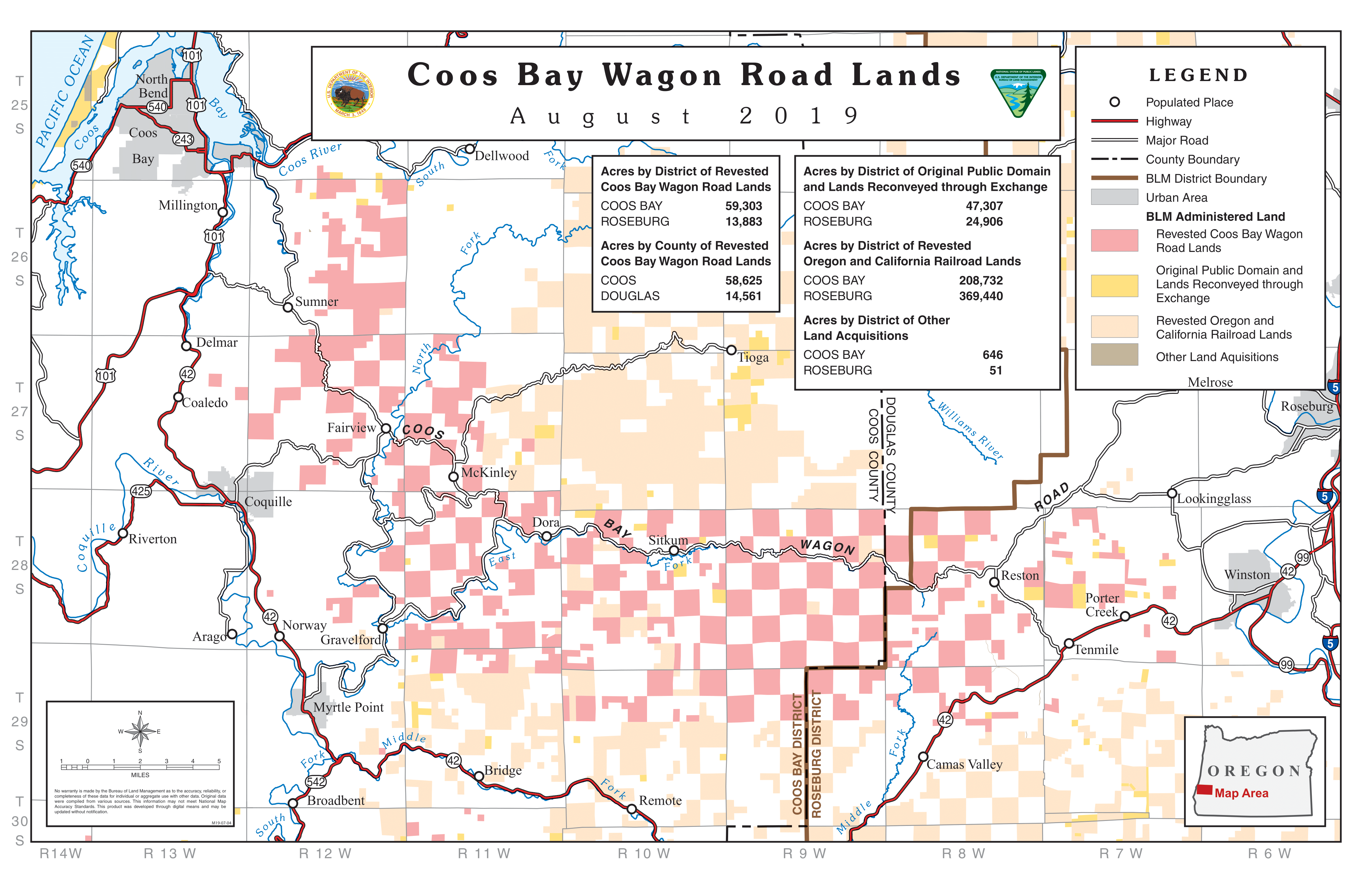
Coos Bay Wagon Road Lands, August 2019

The Coos Bay Wagon Road or Coos Bay Military Wagon Road was a pioneer road in the U.S. state of Oregon that connected Douglas County to Coos Bay starting in 1872. Travelers on the road could start in either Tenmile or Lookingglass near Roseburg. The route passed through Reston, Sitkum, Dora, McKinley, and Fairview, ending in Sumner south of Coos Bay. Eventually the road was continued to Eastside, now a neighborhood of Coos Bay. The road follows the East Fork Coquille River from near the Coos/Douglas county line to Dora.

== See also ==
- Coos Bay Wagon Road Lands
- Stone Bridge and the Oregon Central Military Wagon Road
