= Seelig =

Seelig is a surname and given name. It may refer to:

== People with the surname ==
- Adam Seelig (born 1975), Canadian-American poet and playwright
- Andreas Seelig (born 1970), German discus thrower
- Carl Seelig (1894-1962), German-Swiss writer
- Caroline Seelig, New Zealand academic administrator
- Eric Seelig (1909-1984), German-American boxer
- Georg Seelig (living), Swiss bioengineer
- Heinz Seelig (1909-1992), German-Israeli interior architect
- Jen Seelig (born 1969/1970), American politician from Utah
- Joachim Seelig (born 1942-2024), German chemist
- Michael Seelig (born 1938), Israeli-Canadian architect
- Paul Seelig (1900-1931), Swiss actor
- Tim Seelig (living), American conductor
- Tina Seelig (born 1957), American educator
- Anna Seelig-Löffler (living), Swiss chemist

== People with the given name ==
- Seelig Wise (1913-2004), American politician from Mississippi

== Geographical entities ==
- Seelig Peak, mountain in Antarctica
- Seelig–Byler House, historical building in Oregon, USA

== Other uses ==
- Baldwin v. G.A.F. Seelig, Inc., United States Supreme Court case
