= Oregon Coast Technology School =

Location
- 1913 Meade Street; North Bend, (Coos County), Oregon 97459; United States; 43.407528°N 124.226596°W

Information
- Type: Public Charter school
- School district: North Bend School District
- Principal: Ralph Brooks
- Grades: 6-12
- Enrollment: 369
- Athletics conference: OSAA Skyline League 1A-4
- Website: www.orco-tech.nbend.k12.or.us

Oregon Coast Technology School, also known as ORCO TECH, is a public charter school in North Bend, Oregon, United States. It serves students in grades 6-12; middle school students (grades 6-8) attend classes at North Bend Middle School, while students in grades 9-12 attend classes at North Bend High School.

== Academics ==
In 2008, 100% of the school's seniors received their high school diploma. Of 13 students, 13 graduated and none dropped out.
