= Sandy Creek Bridge =

Covered bridge in Oregon, US

- U.S. National Register of Historic Places
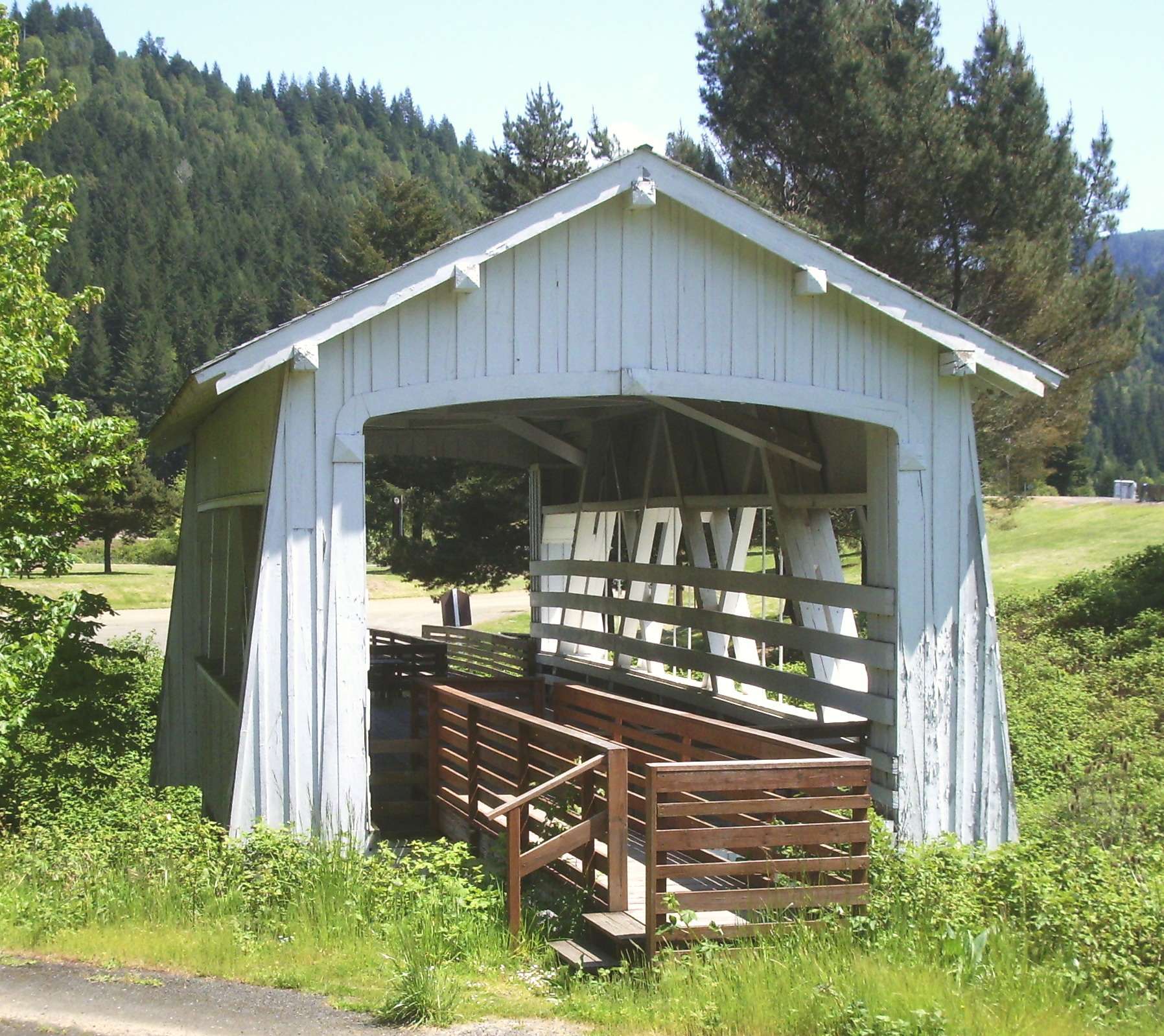
- Sandy Creek Covered Bridge Park at Remote

- Location within Oregon Location within the United States
- Nearest city: Myrtle Point
- Coordinates: 43°00′23″N 123°53′30″W
- Built: 1921
- Architectural style: Howe truss
- MPS: Oregon Covered Bridges TR
- NRHP reference No.: 79002051
- Listed: November 29, 1979

Sandy Creek Bridge is a covered bridge spanning Sandy Creek near the community of Remote in southwestern Oregon in the United States. The bridge crosses the creek near its mouth on the Middle Fork Coquille River in Coos County.

Built in 1921, the bridge carried Oregon Route 42 over the creek until bypassed by a newer bridge in 1949. In 1984, after restoration by volunteers from the Lions Club of Myrtle Point, the structure became a display in a county park at the same site. It is the only remaining covered bridge in Coos County.

Special features of the bridge include large side openings and a truss made of two crossed Howe truss members on each chord. The bridge is 60 feet (18 m) long. It was added the National Register of Historic Places in 1979.

== See also ==
- List of bridges on the National Register of Historic Places in Oregon
- List of Oregon covered bridges
