= Dora, Oregon =

Unincorporated community in the state of Oregon, United States

- Unincorporated community
- Location within the state of Oregon Dora (the United States)
- Coordinates: 43°09′21″N 123°57′22″W
- Country: United States
- State: Oregon
- County: Coos
- Elevation: 148 ft (45 m)
- Time zone: UTC-8 (Pacific (PST))
  - Summer (DST): UTC-7 (PDT)

Dora is an unincorporated community in Coos County, Oregon, United States. It is about 19 miles (31 km) east of Coquille near the East Fork Coquille River on the former route of the Coos Bay Wagon Road. It is in the Southern Oregon Coast Range.

Dora post office was established in 1874. The first postmaster was John H. Roach, and, according to Oregon Geographic Names the location may have been named for his daughter, Dora. The office ceased operations in 1939.

At one time Dora had a United Brethren academy, a Grange hall, and a public school.

Dora shares a rural fire protection district with nearby Sitkum.
