= Tenmile, Oregon =

Tenmile or Ten Mile may refer to one of these places in the U.S. state of Oregon:

- Tenmile, Coos County, Oregon, a populated place west of Lakeside
- Tenmile, Douglas County, Oregon, a populated place southwest of Roseburg
