= Bradley Lake (Oregon) =

Lake in the United States of America

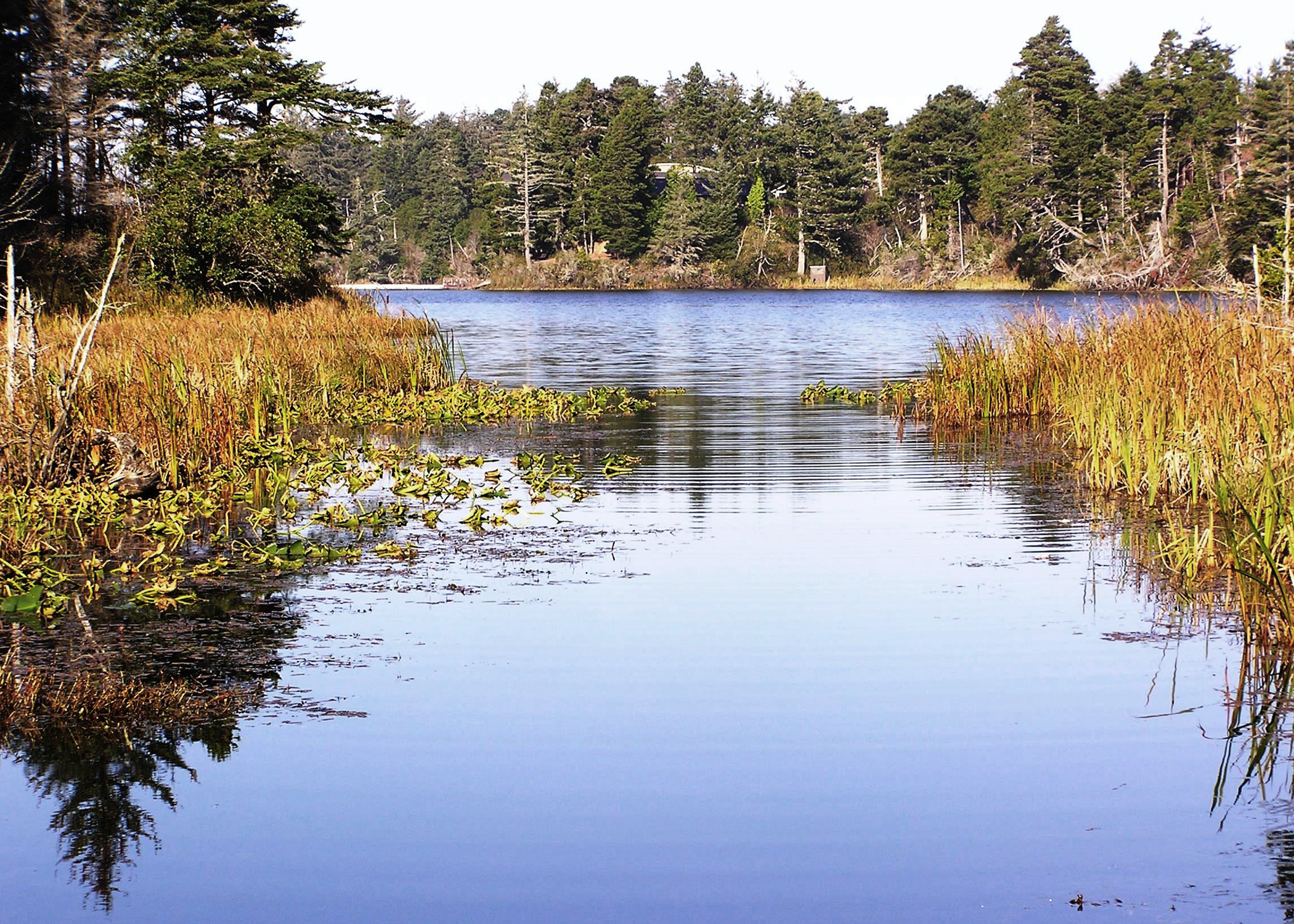
- Grasses and water lilies at Bradley Lake

- Location of Bradley Lake in Oregon, USA. Bradley Lake (the United States)
- Location: Coos County, Oregon
- Coordinates: 43°03′56″N 124°25′38″W
- Primary outflows: China Creek (Oregon)
- Catchment area: 6.46 km^{2} (2.49 sq mi)
- Basin countries: United States
- Surface area: 23 acres (9.3 ha)
- Average depth: 23 ft (7.1 m)
- Max. depth: 33 ft (10.2 m)
- Water volume: 655,963 km^{3} (157,374 cu mi)
- Shore length^{1}: 1 mi (1.6 km)
- Surface elevation: 23 ft (7.0 m)
- ^{1} Shore length is not a well-defined measure.

Bradley Lake is a natural lake on the Oregon Coast in Coos County, Oregon, United States, about 4 miles (6.4 km) south of Bandon. Its surface area is 23 acres (9.3 ha). It is a popular fishing spot for rainbow trout.

Bradley Lake was formed when coastal sand dunes blocked the exit of China Creek, flooding a depression, and accumulating about twenty feet of sediment. The lake has been protected from storm surges, but not tsunami waves, which dumped sand and salt water. Kelsey et al discovered evidence of seventeen such events, after radiocarbon dating of core samples, over a 4600 year period within the Cascadia subduction zone.
