= Fairview, Oregon (disambiguation) =

Fairview, Oregon is the name of one city and several unincorporated communities in the U.S. state of Oregon. They are:

- Fairview, Oregon (city located in Multnomah County)
- Fairview, Coos County, Oregon
- Fairview, Tillamook County, Oregon
