= North Bend High School (disambiguation) =

North Bend High School may refer to:

- North Bend High School, in North Bend, Oregon
- North Bend High School (Washington) in North Bend, Washington, a former school in the Snoqualmie Valley School District
- North Bend Central High School, North Bend, Nebraska
