= Sandy Creek (Middle Fork Coquille River tributary) =

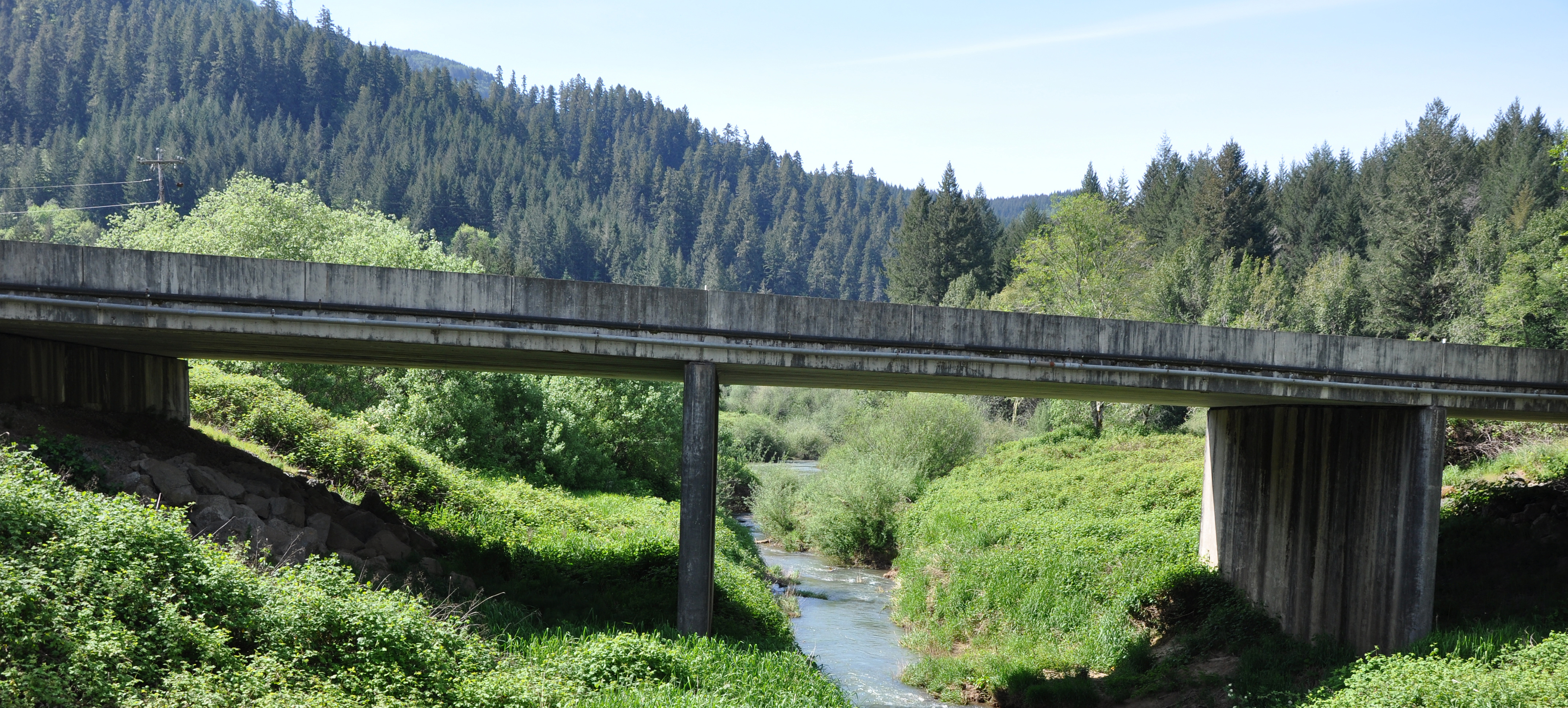
- Sandy Creek flowing under Oregon Route 42 near Remote

- Location of the mouth of Sandy Creek in Oregon

Location
- Country: United States
- State: Oregon
- County: Coos

Physical characteristics
- Source: Southern Oregon Coast Range
  - location: Scott Mountain
  - coordinates: 43°04′57″N 123°49′18″W
  - elevation: 2,267 ft (691 m)
- Mouth: Middle Fork Coquille River
  - location: Remote
  - coordinates: 43°00′16″N 123°53′35″W
  - elevation: 217 ft (66 m)

Sandy Creek is a tributary of the Middle Fork Coquille River in the U.S. state of Oregon. It begins near Scott Mountain in the Southern Oregon Coast Range and flows southwest to meet the river near the rural community of Remote. The creek passes under Oregon Route 42 and enters the river about 16 miles (26 km) from its mouth on the South Fork Coquille River near Myrtle Point. The creek's only named tributary is Fetter Creek, which enters from the right slightly upstream of Remote.

The Sandy Creek Bridge, a covered bridge, crosses the creek in a park near its mouth at Remote. The bridge, which originally carried Route 42 over the creek, is on display in the park. Amenities at Sandy Creek Covered Bridge Park include a footbridge, picnic tables, restrooms, and an information booth.

The bridge was added to the National Register of Historic Places in 1979.

== See also ==
- List of rivers of Oregon
