= Green Acres, Oregon =

Green Acres, Oregon or Greenacres, Oregon may refer to:

- Green Acres, Coos County, Oregon
- Green Acres, Douglas County, Oregon, on Oregon Route 38
