= Middle Fork Coquille River =

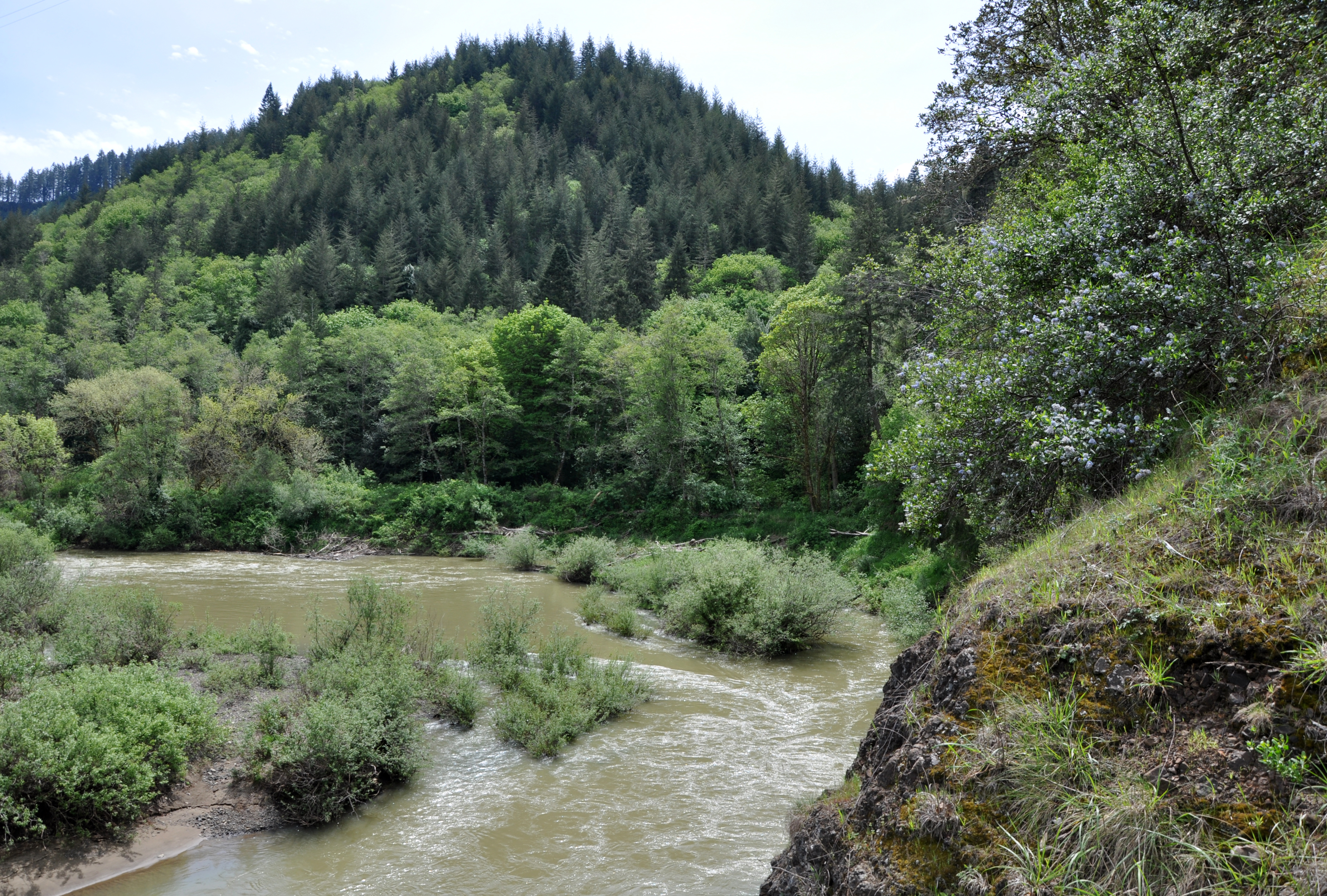
- Middle Fork from bridge carrying Oregon Route 42

- Location of the mouth of the Middle Fork Coquille River in Oregon

Location
- Country: United States
- State: Oregon
- County: Douglas, Coos

Physical characteristics
- Source: Southern Oregon Coast Range
  - location: near Camas Mountain, Douglas County
  - coordinates: 43°06′17″N 123°39′51″W
  - elevation: 1,552 ft (473 m)
- Mouth: South Fork Coquille River
  - location: near Myrtle Point, Coos County
  - coordinates: 43°02′01″N 124°07′01″W
  - elevation: 26 ft (7.9 m)
- Length: 40.3 mi (64.9 km)
- Basin size: 310 sq mi (800 km^{2})

The Middle Fork Coquille River is a tributary, about 40 miles (64 km) long, of the South Fork Coquille River in the U.S. state of Oregon. It begins near Camas Mountain in Douglas County in the Southern Oregon Coast Range. It flows generally south, bypassing the community of Camas Valley while passing through the valley of the same name, then curves west and north to Remote in Coos County. The Middle Fork then flows generally west, passes by the small community of Bridge, and meets the South Fork near Myrtle Point. The confluence with the South Fork is 41 miles (66 km) by water to where the main stem of the Coquille River enters the Pacific Ocean at Bandon.

Oregon Route 42 runs along the river from Camas Valley to the mouth. The land in the watershed is used mainly for timber production and farming; commercial forests dominate much of the region.

== Tributaries ==
Named tributaries of the Middle Fork Coquille River from source to mouth are Estes, Lake, Cole, Lang, Wildcat, Bar, Reed, and Jim Bilieu creeks. Then come Day, Mill, Bingham, Mystic, Twelvemile, Bear, and Slater creeks followed by Panther Creek and another Lake Creek.

Further downstream are Upper Rock, Slide, Sandy, Frenchie and Tanner creeks. Then come Belieu, Myrtle, Salmon, Big, King, McMullen, Endicott, and Indian creeks and another Mill Creek.

== Fishing ==
The Middle Fork supports populations of wild cutthroat trout as well as small runs of salmon and steelhead. Fishing for cutthroat is catch and release. The river is closed to fishing between mid-September and the end of November to protect spawning salmon.

== See also ==
- List of rivers of Oregon
