= Sumner, Oregon =

Unincorporated community in the state of Oregon, United States

- Unincorporated community
- Location within Oregon Location within the United States
- Coordinates: 43°16′54″N 124°09′03″W
- Country: United States
- State: Oregon
- County: Coos
- Elevation: 16 ft (4.9 m)
- Time zone: UTC-8 (Pacific (PST))
  - Summer (DST): UTC-7 (PDT)
- Area codes: 458 and 541
- GNIS feature ID: 1136798
- Coordinates and elevation from Geographic Names Information System

Sumner is an unincorporated community in Coos County, Oregon, United States. It is about 10 miles (16 km) southeast of Coos Bay on the route of the old Coos Bay Wagon Road.

According to William Gladstone Steel, the community was founded in 1888 by John B. Dalley (other sources have the spelling as "Dulley"), who named it after Charles Sumner, a Massachusetts senator who died in 1874. Sumner post office was established in 1874, so according to Oregon Geographic Names, Steel must have been incorrect about the 1888 founding date. Dalley was the first postmaster, and the office closed in 1961. In 1915, Sumner had a population of 100. As of 1990, the community had one store.

== See also ==
- Steamboats of Coos Bay
