= East Fork Coquille River =

River in Oregon, US

- Location of the mouth of the East Fork Coquille River in Oregon

Location
- Country: United States
- State: Oregon
- County: Douglas, Coos

Physical characteristics
- Source: Southern Oregon Coast Range
  - location: near Bennett Rock, Douglas County
  - coordinates: 43°07′05″N 123°40′27″W
  - elevation: 2,660 ft (810 m)
- Mouth: North Fork Coquille River
  - location: Gravelford, Coos County
  - coordinates: 43°06′21″N 124°04′36″W
  - elevation: 43 ft (13 m)
- Length: 33.8 mi (54.4 km)
- Basin size: 135 sq mi (350 km^{2})

The East Fork Coquille River is a tributary, about 34 miles (55 km) long, of the North Fork Coquille River in the U.S. state of Oregon. It begins near Bennett Rock in Douglas County in the Southern Oregon Coast Range.

The East Fork flows generally west through the Brewster Valley near the rural community of Sitkum to the vicinity of Dora in Coos County. Downstream of Dora, the river turns southwest to meet the North Fork at Gravelford. The mouth of the East Fork is about 10 miles (16 km) from the North Fork's confluence with the South Fork Coquille River near Myrtle Point and 46 miles (74 km) river miles from the Coquille River mouth on the Pacific Ocean at Bandon.

The land in the watershed is used mainly for timber production and farming; commercial forests dominate in much of the region.

== Tributaries ==
Named tributaries of the East Fork Coquille River from source to mouth are Knepper, Lost, Dead Horse, Camas, Brummit, China, and Bills creeks. Then come Steel and Hantz creeks followed by Yankee Run. Below that are Elk and Weekly creeks.

== Recreation ==
Frona County Park near Dora and Bennett County Park near Gravelford are campgrounds and day-use areas for picnicking and fishing.

The East Fork supports populations of cutthroat trout, steelhead, and Chinook and coho salmon. Frona Park has a steelhead acclimation pond along Hantz Creek. Only finclipped steelhead may be caught and kept, and the river is closed to coho fishing.

== See also ==
- List of rivers of Oregon
