= North Bend School District =

School district in Oregon, USA

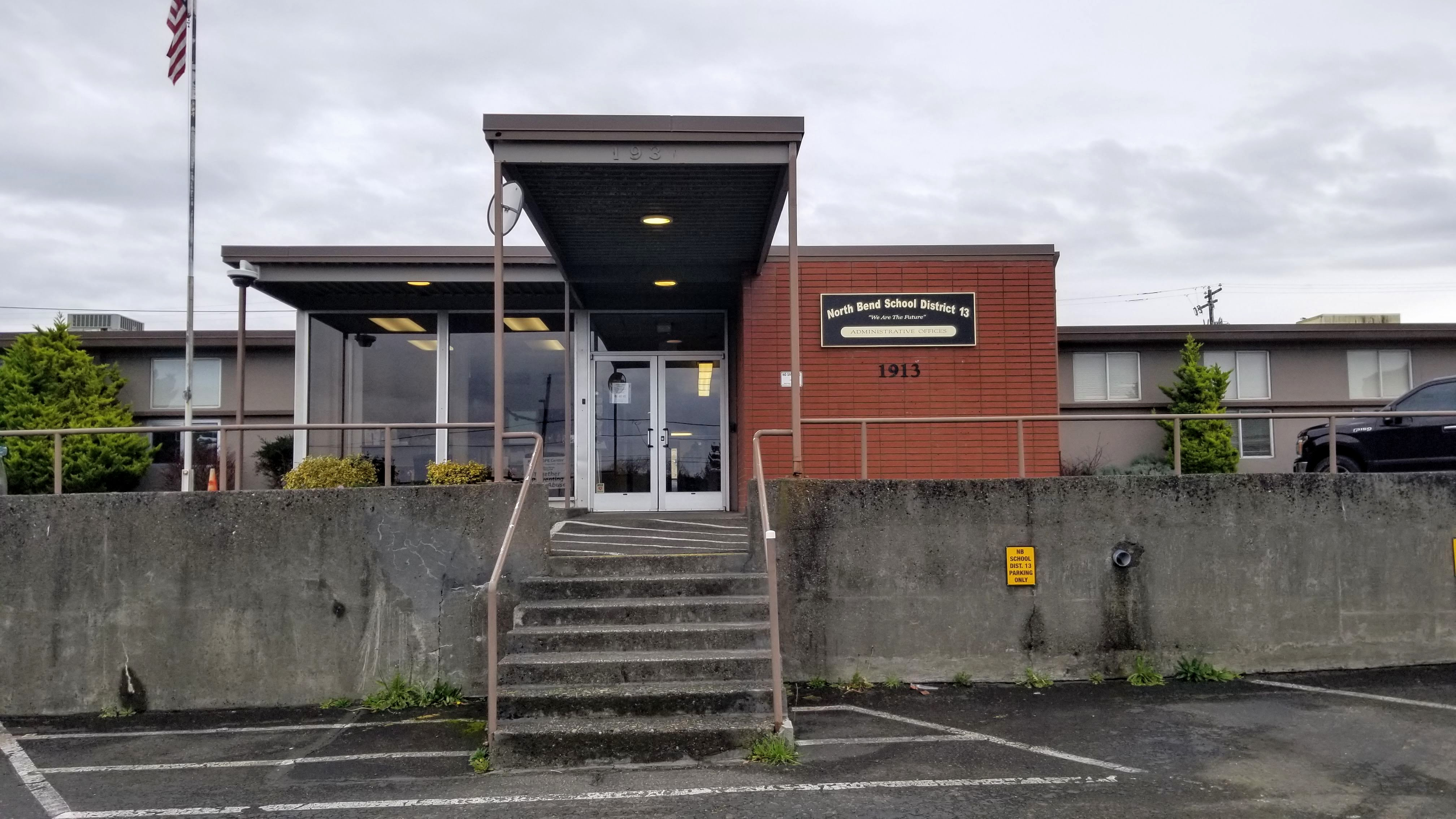
- North Bend School District 13 Administration Building

Address
- 1913 Meade Street North Bend, Oregon, 97459; United States

District information
- Type: Public
- Grades: PreK–12
- NCES District ID: 4108820

Students and staff
- Students: 5,395
- Teachers: 217.57 (FTE)
- Staff: 207.92 (FTE)
- Student–teacher ratio: 24.8

Other information
- Website: www.nbend.k12.or.us

North Bend School District (13) is a public school district that serves the city of North Bend, Oregon, United States.

The district, entirely in Coos County, includes North Bend, Glasgow, Lakeside, and Saunders Lake.

== History ==
It came to national attention in 2018, when the Oregon Department of Education's report found that LGBT high school students in the district were subjected to systematic harassment and given the Bible to read as punishment.

== Demographics ==
In the 2009 school year, the district had 73 students classified as homeless by the Department of Education, or 3.0% of students in the district.

== Schools ==
Elementary schools

- Hillcrest Elementary School
- North Bay Elementary School

Secondary schools

- North Bend Middle School
- North Bend High School

Charter schools

- Lighthouse School (grades kindergarten-eight)
- Oregon Coast Technology School (grades six- twelve) (ORCO Tech will no longer exist at the end of the 2015–2016 school year)
