= McKinley, Oregon =

Unincorporated community in the state of Oregon, United States

- Unincorporated community
- Location within Oregon Location within the United States
- Coordinates: 43.189°N 124.026°W
- Country: United States
- State: Oregon
- County: Coos
- Elevation: 138 ft (42 m)
- Time zone: UTC-8 (Pacific (PST))
  - Summer (DST): UTC-7 (PDT)
- ZIP code: 97423
- Area codes: 458 and 541
- GNIS feature ID: 1123991
- Coordinates and elevation from Geographic Names Information System

McKinley is an unincorporated community in Coos County, Oregon, United States. McKinley lies along Middle Creek, a tributary of the North Fork Coquille River, northeast of Myrtle Point in the Southern Oregon Coast Range.

Homer Shepherd suggested the name in honor of President William McKinley. Shepherd helped establish the McKinley post office in June 1897 and served as its first postmaster.
