= Bridge, Oregon =

Unincorporated community in the state of Oregon, United States

- Unincorporated community
- Location within the state of Oregon Bridge (the United States)
- Coordinates: 43°01′26″N 124°00′25″W
- Country: United States
- State: Oregon
- County: Coos
- Elevation: 154 ft (47 m)
- Time zone: UTC-8 (Pacific (PST))
  - Summer (DST): UTC-7 (PDT)
- GNIS feature ID: 1118065

Bridge is an unincorporated community in Coos County, Oregon, United States. It is about 9 miles (14 km) east of Myrtle Point on Oregon Route 42 near the Middle Fork Coquille River.

A post office two miles west of this locale was named "Angora" and ran from August 1883 until May 1894. There had previously been a post office named "Enchanted Prairie" from 1870 to 1883 when the name was changed to Angora and moved to the home of the new postmaster. Angora post office moved twice more, each time to the home of the current postmaster. Bridge post office was established in July 1894, named for a nearby bridge over the river. The Post Office Department did not approve reestablishing the name Angora, and later a post office by that name was established in Lincoln County. Bridge post office closed in 1945.

Bridge was stagecoach stop where horses were changed. In 1915 the town had a creamery, sawmill, gristmill, school, and a Christian Church, and in 1940 Bridge had a population of 39. As of 1990, Bridge had a store and a tavern. The Church of the Brethren owns Camp Myrtlewood south of Bridge. The Christian Church, founded in 1900, now operates as the Bridge Community Church.
