= Gravelford, Oregon =

Unincorporated community in the state of Oregon, United States

- Unincorporated community
- Location within the state of Oregon Gravelford (the United States)
- Coordinates: 43°06′18″N 124°04′41″W
- Country: United States
- State: Oregon
- County: Coos
- Elevation: 56 ft (17 m)
- Time zone: UTC-8 (Pacific (PST))
  - Summer (DST): UTC-7 (PDT)
- GNIS feature ID: 1121336

Gravelford is an unincorporated community in Coos County, Oregon, United States. It is about 8 miles (13 km) northeast of Myrtle Point, at the confluence of the North Fork Coquille River and the East Fork Coquille River.

The name of the community came from a natural ford in the stream. A post office with the name Gravel Ford was established in 1878 with Solomon J. McCloskey the first postmaster. Post office records always used the two-word spelling, but post office route maps and USGS topographical maps use the one-word spelling. The office closed in 1934, with mail going to Myrtle Point.

In 1915, Gravelford had two cheese factories, two churches, an Adventist academy, and a public school. As of 1990, only two houses remained of the town. Gravelford's volunteer fire department is a satellite station of Myrtle Point. Gravelford Cemetery was founded in 1884.
