= Saunders Lake, Oregon =

- Census-designated place
- Location within Oregon Location within the United States
- Coordinates: 43°31′16″N 124°12′38″W
- Country: United States
- State: Oregon
- County: Coos

Area
  - Total: 2.95 sq mi (7.63 km^{2})
  - Land: 2.85 sq mi (7.37 km^{2})
  - Water: 0.10 sq mi (0.26 km^{2})
- Elevation: 197 ft (60 m)

Population (2020)
  - Total: 1,055
  - Density: 370.6/sq mi (143.09/km^{2})
- Time zone: UTC-8 (Pacific (PST))
  - Summer (DST): UTC-7 (PDT)
- ZIP Code: 97459 (North Bend)
- Area codes: 541/458
- FIPS code: 41-65450
- GNIS feature ID: 2812876

Saunders Lake is an unincorporated community and census-designated place (CDP) in Coos County, Oregon, United States. It was first listed as a CDP prior to the 2020 census. As of the 2020 census, Saunders Lake had a population of 1,055.

The CDP is in northwestern Coos County, along U.S. Route 101, 11 miles (18 km) north of Coos Bay and 16 miles (26 km) south of Reedsport. Saunders Lake, a small water body, is in the northern part of the CDP, draining north through Clear Lake to Saunders Creek, which flows north to Tenmile Creek between Lakeside and the Pacific Ocean.

The Saunders Lake CDP is bordered to the west by the Oregon Dunes National Recreation Area.

== Demographics ==
Historical population
Census	Pop.	Note	%±
2020	1,055		—
U.S. Decennial Census

As of the 2020 census there were 1,055 people, 526 housing units, and 535 families. There were 944 White people, 0 African Americans, 30 Native Americans, 12 Asians, 1 Pacific Islander, 10 people from some other race, and 58 people from two or more races. 29 people were of Hispanic or Latino origin.

The ancestry in Saunders Lake was 20.2% English, 18.1% Italian, 17.1% German, 7.6% Irish, 5.0% Scottish, and 1.5% French.

The median age was 42.6 years old. 16.6% of the population were older than 65, with 11.5% from 65 to 74, 3.9% from 75 to 84, and 1.2% from ages older than 85.

Even though the median income was recorded, families had $185,022, and non-families had $16,544. 6.4% of the population were in poverty.

== Education ==
It is in the North Bend School District 13. The comprehensive high school is North Bend High School.
