= Sitkum, Oregon =

Unincorporated community in the state of Oregon, United States

- Unincorporated community
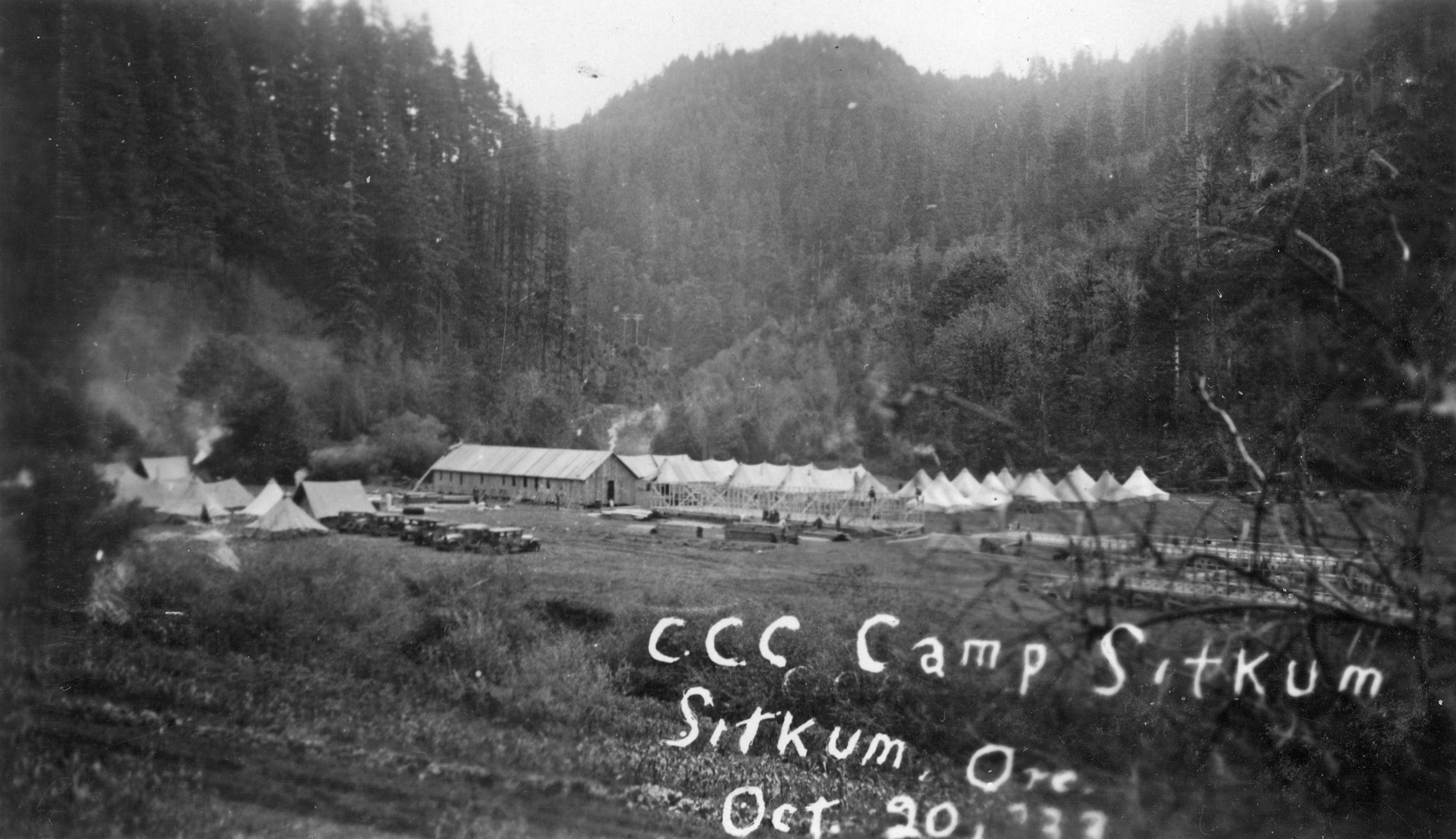
- Civilian Conservation Corps' Camp Sitkum, 1933

- Location within the state of Oregon Sitkum (the United States)
- Coordinates: 43°08′53″N 123°51′40″W
- Country: United States
- State: Oregon
- County: Coos
- Elevation: 722 ft (220 m)
- Time zone: UTC-8 (Pacific (PST))
  - Summer (DST): UTC-7 (PDT)

Sitkum is an unincorporated community in Coos County, Oregon, United States. It is about 27 miles north of Remote in the Southern Oregon Coast Range near the East Fork Coquille River. Sitkum is served by the Myrtle Point post office.

A tavern or roadhouse was established as a stagecoach stop near a point halfway between Roseburg and Coos City on the Coos Bay Wagon Road about 1872 or 1873. A competitor put up another halfway house nearby and the name Sitkum, a Chinook Jargon word for "half", was selected for the place. Sitkum post office took its name from the tavern. It ran from 1873 to 1964, with one intermission. The Halfway House at Sitkum was a combination restaurant, tavern, rooming house, post office and telegraph station where travelers stopped while horses were changed. There is little left of the community today, and the Sitkum School was converted into a residence. The former teacher's house and the gym still exist on the grounds.

== Climate ==
Sitkum has a Köppen climate type of CSB (warm-summer mediterranean), which is most of western Oregon.

Climate data for Sitkum, Oregon 1948-1969
Month	Jan	Feb	Mar	Apr	May	Jun	Jul	Aug	Sep	Oct	Nov	Dec	Year
Mean daily maximum °F (°C)	47.7 (8.7)	52.6 (11.4)	54.5 (12.5)	60.7 (15.9)	65.8 (18.8)	71.9 (22.2)	77.1 (25.1)	77.8 (25.4)	74.3 (23.5)	65 (18)	55.6 (13.1)	50.2 (10.1)	62.8 (17.1)
Mean daily minimum °F (°C)	34.0 (1.1)	36.5 (2.5)	36.5 (2.5)	38.7 (3.7)	43.0 (6.1)	47.0 (8.3)	49.2 (9.6)	49.7 (9.8)	47.5 (8.6)	43.7 (6.5)	39.3 (4.1)	36.4 (2.4)	41.8 (5.4)
Average precipitation inches (mm)	12.86 (327)	11 (280)	11.0 (280)	4.46 (113)	4.18 (106)	1.71 (43)	0.46 (12)	0.8 (20)	2.04 (52)	7.28 (185)	11.08 (281)	13.17 (335)	80.03 (2,033)
Average snowfall inches (cm)	5.3 (13)	2.4 (6.1)	2.2 (5.6)	0.6 (1.5)	0.3 (0.76)	0 (0)	0 (0)	0 (0)	0 (0)	0.0 (0.0)	1.3 (3.3)	1.1 (2.8)	13.2 (34)
Source: https://wrcc.dri.edu/
