= Chandler Hotel and Annex =

Coordinates: 43.3676°N 124.2138°W

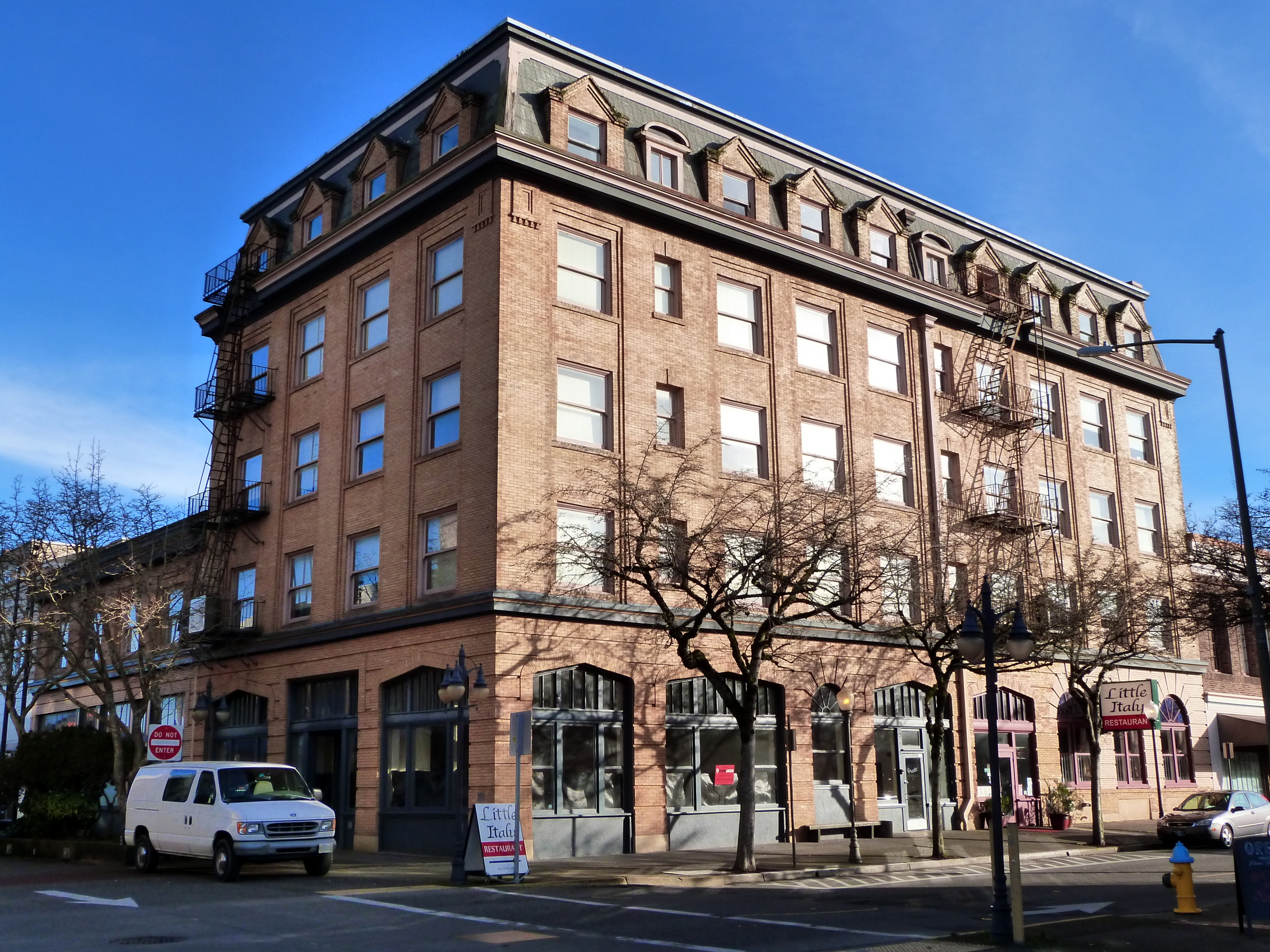
The building's exterior, 2015

The Chandler Hotel and Annex is a historic building in Coos Bay, Oregon, United States. It is listed on the National Register of Historic Places.

== See also ==
- National Register of Historic Places listings in Coos County, Oregon
