= Leneve, Oregon =

Unincorporated community in the state of Oregon, United States

- Unincorporated community
- Location within Oregon Location within the United States
- Coordinates: 43.206°N 124.274°W
- Country: United States
- State: Oregon
- County: Coos
- Elevation: 30 ft (9.1 m)
- Time zone: UTC-8 (Pacific (PST))
  - Summer (DST): UTC-7 (PDT)
- ZIP code: 97423
- Area codes: 458 and 541
- Coordinates and elevation from Geographic Names Information System

Leneve is an unincorporated community in Coos County, Oregon, United States. It lies along North Bank Road off Oregon Route 42 northeast of Coquille. Beaver Slough enters the Coquille River at Leneve.

Named after a pioneer family, its post office operated from April 5, 1917, to May 31, 1934. Post office authorities considered but rejected Conlogue as the name of the office before settling on Leneve.
