= Libby, Oregon =

Unincorporated community in the state of Oregon, United States

- Unincorporated community
- Location within Oregon Location within the United States
- Coordinates: 43.338°N 124.234°W
- Country: United States
- State: Oregon
- County: Coos
- Elevation: 62 ft (19 m)
- Time zone: UTC-8 (Pacific (PST))
  - Summer (DST): UTC-7 (PDT)
- ZIP code: 97420
- Area codes: 458 and 541
- Coordinates and elevation from Geographic Names Information System

Libby, previously known as Easport, is an unincorporated community on Coalbank Slough in Coos County, Oregon, United States. It was named for a Native American woman. Its post office was established on June 11, 1890, and operated for just two years. Enoch Gore was postmaster.

Libby lies along Libby Road west of U.S. Route 101 and slightly south of the city of Coos Bay. Coalbank Slough flows generally north into Coos Bay.
