= Coos Bay National Bank Building =

- U.S. National Register of Historic Places
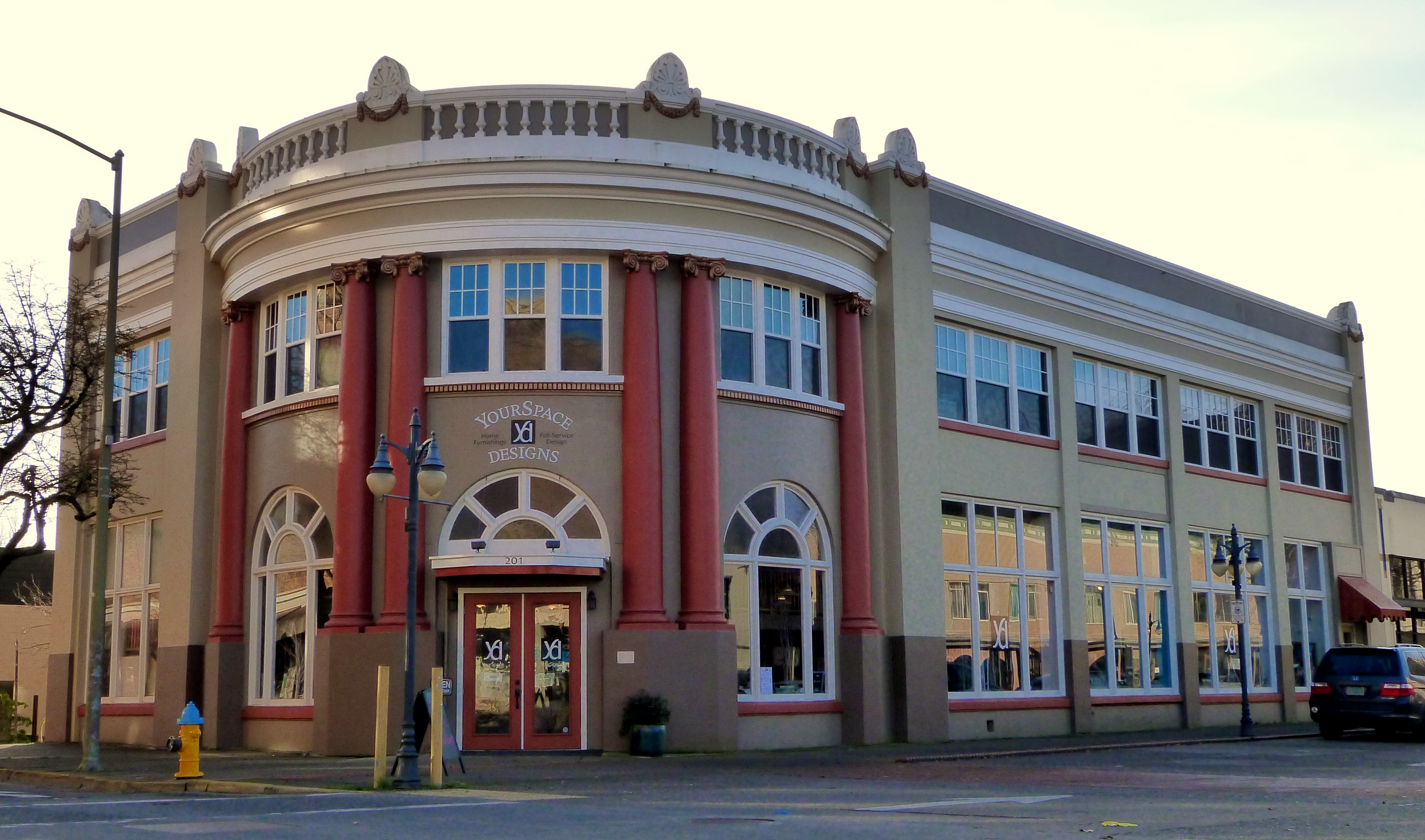
- The building in 2015

- Location within the United States Location within Oregon
- Location: 201 Central Avenue; Coos Bay, Oregon
- Coordinates: 43°22′04″N 124°12′52″W
- Area: 5,000 square feet (460 m^{2})
- Built: 1923–1924
- Built by: Graham and Aitken
- Architect: Tourtellotte and Hummel
- Architectural style: Beaux-Arts, Neoclassical
- NRHP reference No.: 89001868
- Added to NRHP: October 30, 1989

The Coos Bay National Bank Building is a historic commercial building in Coos Bay, Oregon, United States. Completed in 1924, it is an outstanding example of Beaux-Arts eclecticism with a Classical theme by the architecture firm of Tourtellotte and Hummel. It is especially notable as the only building of its architectural type in the Coos Bay area. Although its design integrity has been compromised somewhat, especially by removal of a low dome over the entrance rotunda and modifications to the surrounds of the entry door, it still conveys the essential character-defining traits of its design. It served as the headquarters of the Coos Bay National Bank from its construction until Coos Bay National Bank merged with U.S. National Bank in 1956. The building remained a branch of U.S. National Bank until 1975. Coos Bay National Bank, a community fixture founded in 1915 as the Scandinavian American Bank, exemplified the trend of ethnic banks in the United States and Scandinavian settlement around Coos Bay. As a business institution it played a leading role in the development of Coos Bay during the period between the world wars and in the city's emergence as a major lumber port. It was the only one of four locally controlled banks to survive the Great Depression.

The building was entered on the National Register of Historic Places in 1989.

== See also ==
- National Register of Historic Places listings in Coos County, Oregon
