= Glasgow, Oregon =

Unincorporated community in the state of Oregon, United States

- Census-designated place and Unincorporated Community
- Location within Oregon Location within the United States
- Coordinates: 43°26′14″N 124°11′46″W
- Country: United States
- State: Oregon
- County: Coos

Area
  - Total: 3.22 sq mi (8.35 km^{2})
  - Land: 3.22 sq mi (8.35 km^{2})
  - Water: 0 sq mi (0.00 km^{2})
- Elevation: 453 ft (138 m)

Population (2020)
  - Total: 785
  - Density: 243.6/sq mi (94.06/km^{2})
- Time zone: UTC-8 (Pacific (PST))
  - Summer (DST): UTC-7 (PDT)
- ZIP code: 97459
- Area codes: 458 and 541
- FIPS code: 41-29100
- GNIS feature ID: 2611732

Glasgow is an unincorporated community in Coos County, Oregon, United States. For statistical purposes, the United States Census Bureau has defined Glasgow as a census-designated place (CDP). The census definition of the area may not precisely correspond to local understanding of the area with the same name. As of the 2020 census the Glasgow CDP had a population of 785.

Glasgow is located on the north side of Coos Bay, about 6 miles (10 km) north of the city of Coos Bay, just east of U.S. Route 101.

The community was founded by real estate speculators in the 1890s, including Henry L. Pittock, Phil Metschan, and Admiral Schley of the Pacific Coal & Transportation Company. The community did not flourish until 30 years after its founding, when construction of Route 101 made Glasgow the northern terminus of the ferry from North Bend, which was used to cross the bay prior to the completion of the Coos Bay Bridge. The place was supposedly named by a Scot because it reminded him of Glasgow, Scotland, but the authors of Oregon Geographic Names were unable to verify this.

Glasgow has a store and a Grange hall, the North Bayside Grange, also known as the Glasgow Grange, that was built in 1928. A humorous sign at the store states that the community's population is "275.5", the .5 for store owner and "self-proclaimed mayor", Jack S. Stevens.

== Demographics ==
Historical population
Census	Pop.	Note	%±
2010	763		—
2020	785		2.9%
U.S. Decennial Census

As of the 2020 census, there were 785 people, 395 housing units, and 394 families in the CDP. There were 683 White people,3 African Americans, 15 Native Americans, 17 Asians, 6 people from some other race, and 61 people from two or more races. 334 people were from Hispanic or Latino.

The ancestry in Glasgow was 19.4% Irish, 16.9% German, 6.8% English, 5.7% Italian, 3.8% Scottish, and 3.4% Polish.

The median age was 57.3 years old. 31.3% of the population were older than 65, with 18.0% between the ages of 65 and 74, 12.0% between the ages of 75 and 84, and 1.4% 85 or older.

== Education ==
It is in the North Bend School District 13. The comprehensive high school is North Bend High School.
