= Laurel Grove, Oregon =

Unincorporated community in the state of Oregon, United States

- Unincorporated community
- Location within Oregon Location within the United States
- Coordinates: 43.026°N 124.415°W
- Country: United States
- State: Oregon
- County: Coos
- Elevation: 118 ft (36 m)
- Time zone: UTC-8 (Pacific (PST))
  - Summer (DST): UTC-7 (PDT)
- ZIP code: 97411
- Area codes: 458 and 541
- Coordinates and elevation from Geographic Names Information System

Laurel Grove is an unincorporated community in Coos County, Oregon, United States. It lies along U.S. Route 101 south of Bandon and east of Bandon State Natural Area.
