= North Fork Coquille River =

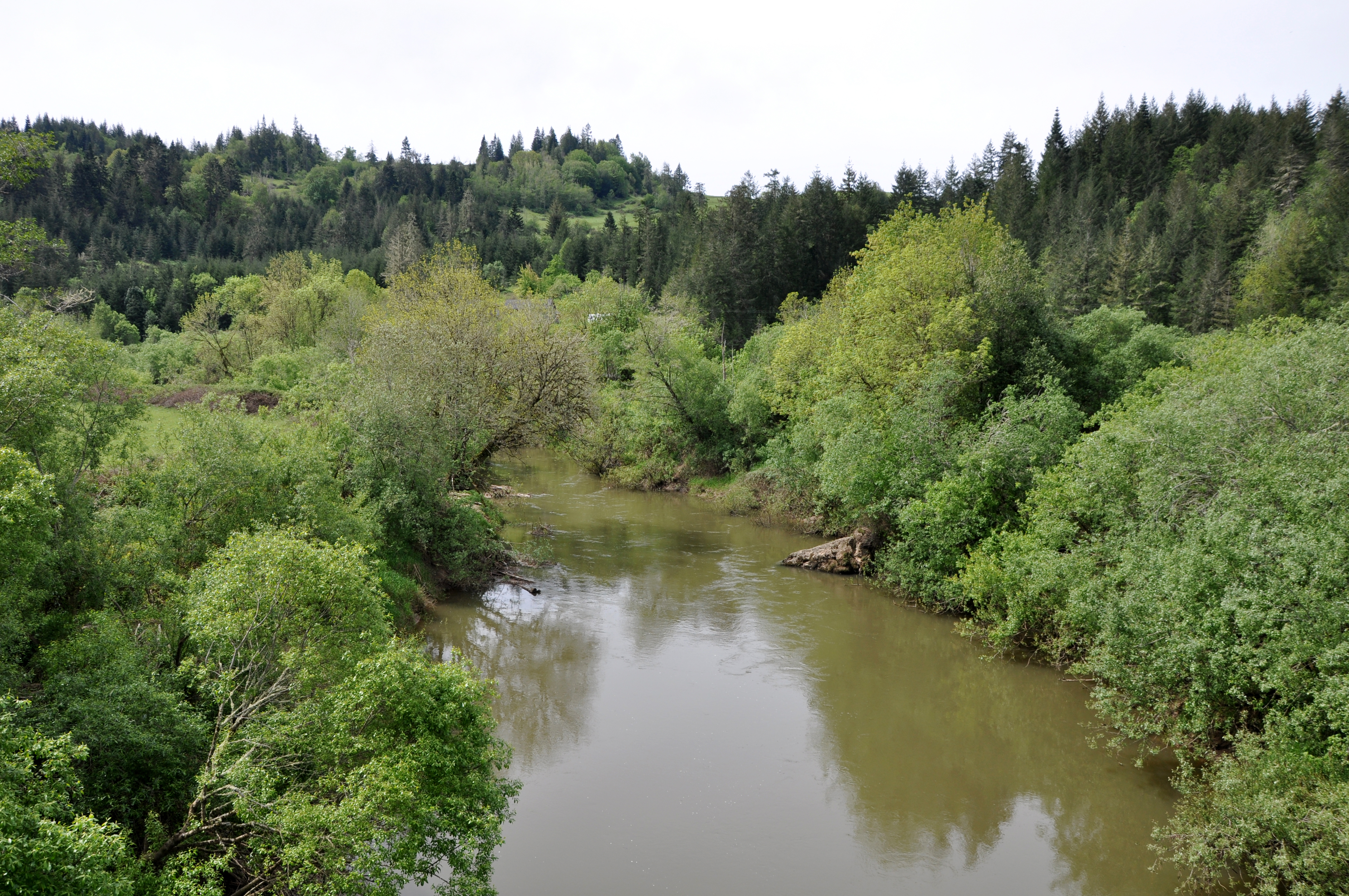
- View from a bridge upstream of Myrtle Point

- Location of the mouth of the North Fork Coquille River in Oregon

Location
- Country: United States
- State: Oregon
- District: Coos County
- City: Myrtle Point

Physical characteristics
- Source: Coos Mountain
  - location: Oregon Coast Range, Coos County
  - coordinates: 43°16′54″N 123°51′14″W
  - elevation: 1,654 ft (504 m)
- Mouth: Coquille River
  - location: Myrtle Point, Coos County
  - coordinates: 43°04′49″N 124°08′29″W
  - elevation: 13 ft (4.0 m)
- Length: 53.3 mi (85.8 km)
- Basin size: 154 sq mi (400 km^{2})
- Discharge
  - location: Myrtle Point, Oregon
  - average: 945 cu ft/s (26.8 m^{3}/s)
  - maximum: 38,400 cu ft/s (1,090 m^{3}/s)

The North Fork Coquille River is a 53-mile (85 km) tributary of the Coquille River in the southern Oregon Coast Range in the U.S. state of Oregon. It begins at an elevation of about 1,700 feet (520 m) above sea level and drops to 13 feet (4.0 m) near Myrtle Point, where it joins the South Fork Coquille River to form the main stem.

== Course ==
About 53 miles (85 km) long, it starts as the confluence of several gulches on the east slope of Coos Mountain in Coos County. The river first flows north, but then turns west and south. It intersects Laverne County Park, passes through the rural community of Fairview and then Rock Prairie County Park before receiving Middle Creek from the left. It continues south through the hills and receives the East Fork Coquille River, also from the left, at the rural community of Gravelford. The river then turns west, meandering to a point north of Myrtle Point. Here it joins the South Fork Coquille River to form the Coquille, which flows west to the Pacific Ocean at Bandon.

=== Tributaries ===
Named tributaries of the North Fork Coquille River from source to mouth are Little North Fork Coquille River followed by North Fork, Giles, Neely, Whilley, Moon, Hudson, and Swayne creeks. Below this come Evans, Steele, Blair, Lost, Middle, Schoolhouse, Garage, Wood, and Wimer creeks. Next is the East Fork Coquille River followed by Johns, Kessler, Carey, and Llewellyn creeks.

== Watershed ==
About 70 percent of the Coquille River basin is forested, and most of the forest land produces commercial timber. Other land uses in the basin include farming and mining. Population is very sparse on the forested slopes above the valleys.

== See also ==
- List of longest streams of Oregon
- List of rivers of Oregon
