= Koski Building =

Coordinates: 43°22′8″N 124°12′48″W

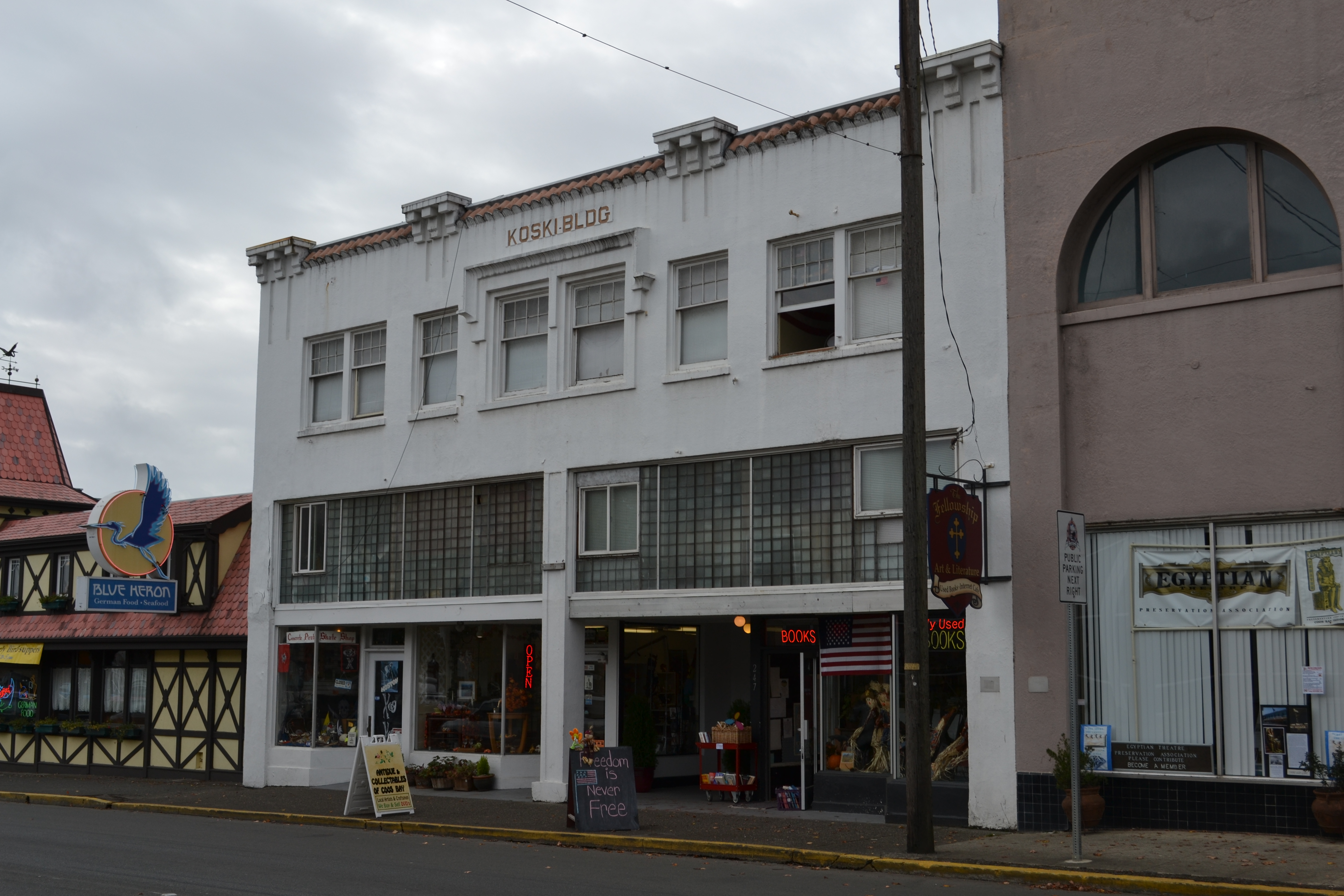
The building's exterior, 2011

The Koski Building is a historic building in Coos Bay, Oregon, United States. It is listed on the National Register of Historic Places.

== See also ==
- National Register of Historic Places listings in Coos County, Oregon
