= Osprey Site =

Archaeological site in Oregon, U.S.

- 35-CS-130–The Osprey Site
- U.S. National Register of Historic Places
- Location: Address restricted (Note: Federal and state laws and practices restrict general public access to information regarding the specific location of this resource. In some cases, this is to protect archeological sites from vandalism, while in other cases it is restricted at the request of the owner.)
- Nearest city: Bandon, Oregon (Note: The site's National Register nomination document identifies both Bandon and North Bend as nearby cities.)
- Area: 10.5 acres (4.2 ha)
- MPS: Native American Archeological Sites of the Oregon Coast MPS
- NRHP reference No.: 01000131
- Added to NRHP: March 6, 2001

The Osprey Site (Smithsonian trinomial: 35CS130) is an archeological site located near Bandon, Oregon, United States. It was listed on the National Register of Historic Places in 2001.

Associated with the Coquille people, the Osprey Site is the largest known complex of fishing weirs on the Oregon coast, encompassing over 3000 identified wooden weir stakes organized into 25 discrete weir features. The site has also yielded more split wood lattice panels than any other weir location along the Northwest coast.

Radiocarbon dating suggests the site was in use possibly as early as 560 to 670 CE, and historic accounts indicate it continued in use into the 1850s. It is a site of outstanding cultural importance to the Coquille people, and great research importance for understanding variation in weir technology during the precontact and postcontact periods.

== See also ==
- National Register of Historic Places listings in Coos County, Oregon
