= Millington, Oregon =

Unincorporated community in the state of Oregon, United States

- Unincorporated community
- Location within Oregon Location within the United States
- Coordinates: 43.332°N 124.198°W
- Country: United States
- State: Oregon
- County: Coos
- Elevation: 26 ft (7.9 m)
- Time zone: UTC-8 (Pacific (PST))
  - Summer (DST): UTC-7 (PDT)
- ZIP code: 97420
- Area codes: 458 and 541
- GNIS feature ID: 1136542
- Coordinates and elevation from Geographic Names Information System

Millington is an unincorporated community in Coos County, Oregon, United States. It lies along U.S. Route 101 slightly south of the city of Coos Bay. Isthmus Slough, which flows into Coos Bay, passes by Millington. Millington has a Coos Bay mailing address.
