= Michael Seelig =

Israeli Canadian architect

- מיכאל זליג
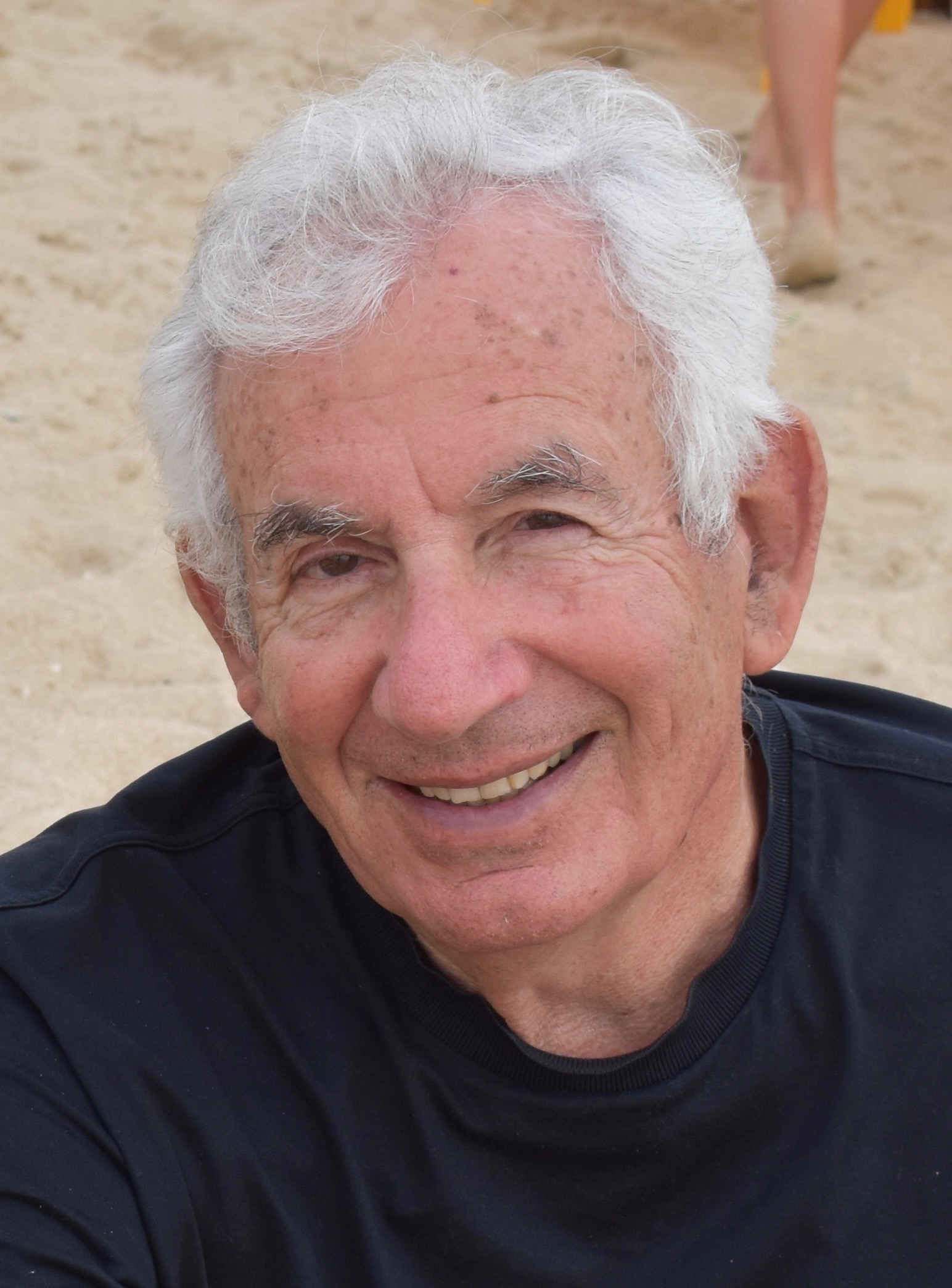
- Born: 24 August 1938 (age 87); Tel Aviv
- Known for: Urban Planning

Michael Seelig (Hebrew: מיכאל זליג) is an Israeli Canadian architect and urban planner known for his contributions to urban public policy in Vancouver and for co-founding Bridges Restaurant, a Vancouver landmark.

== Biography ==
Michael Seelig was born in Tel Aviv, Israel (then British Mandatory Palestine) in 1938, and grew up in Haifa. He received his Diploma in Architecture from Hammersmith College of Art and Building in London (1964) and his master's degree (1969) and PhD (1971) in City Planning from the University of Pennsylvania. Seelig worked as an architect for Al Mansfeld Architects in Haifa (1966); Yorke Rosenberg Mardall in London (1967); and Louis Kahn in Philadelphia (1968-9). He is currently Professor Emeritus at the University of British Columbia School of Community and Regional Planning where he taught from 1971 to 2000.

== Urban planning ==
In 1972 Seelig, together with partners Frederick Gutheim and Arthur Erickson, established the planning firm Gutheim/Seelig/Erickson in Vancouver. The firm conducted a "Design Competition for the Urban Environment of Developing Countries Focused on Manila," which dealt with improving housing conditions for urban squatters. Seelig curated an exhibition of the results of the competition at the Vancouver Art Gallery in conjunction with Habitat, the United Nations Conference on Human Settlements in 1976, and published the results in The Architecture of Self-Help Communities.

Seelig co-authored a week-long series of articles on the future of Greater Vancouver for the Vancouver Sun entitled "Future Growth - Future Shock," which focused on accommodation of rapid growth, challenges of globalization, land use and transportation, and municipal and regional governance. The predictions made in this series continue to be discussed and critiqued.

As a city planner, Seelig has contributed frequently to national and local Canadian newspapers, radio and TV shows, and hosted a series of eight, one-hour TV programs, "Urban Change and Conflict," produced by the BBC and broadcast on Vancouver's Knowledge Network (1986-1990).
