= North Bend High School =

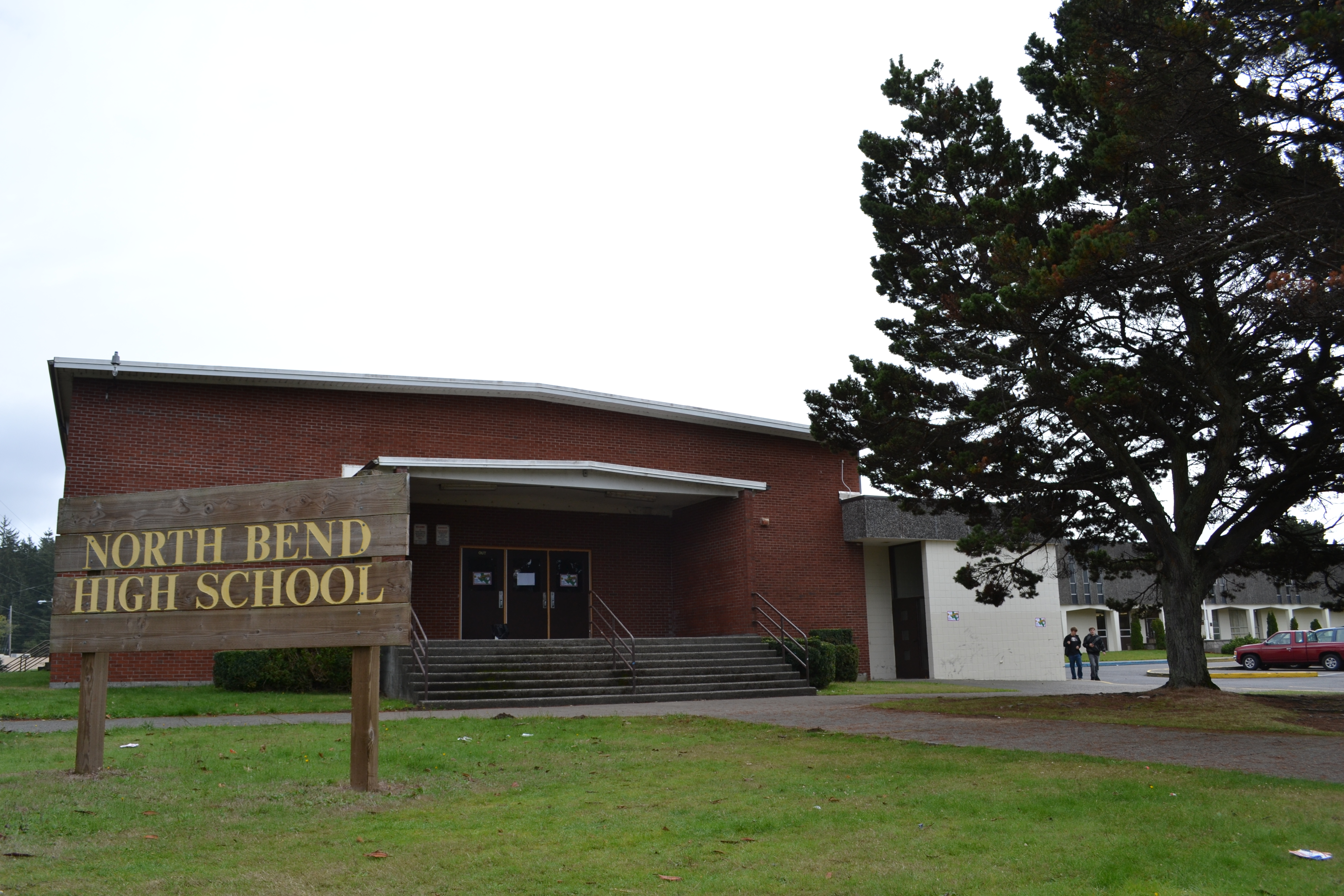

Location
- 2323 Pacific Avenue; North Bend, Coos, Oregon 97459; United States; 43.398687°N 124.232841°W

Information
- Type: Public
- Established: 1908
- School district: North Bend School District
- Principal: Chris Pendleton
- Teaching staff: 35.43 (FTE)
- Grades: 9–12
- Enrollment: 690 (2024–2025)
- Student to teacher ratio: 19.48
- Colors: Brown and gold
- Athletics conference: OSAA 4A-4 Sky Em League
- Mascot: Bulldog
- Team name: Bulldogs
- Rival: Marshfield High School, Cottage Grove High School
- Newspaper: The Bulldog Barker
- Yearbook: Hesperia
- Website: http://www.nbhs.nbend.k12.or.us/

North Bend High School is a public high school in North Bend, Oregon, United States. It is a part of the North Bend School District.

The district includes North Bend, Glasgow, Lakeside, and Saunders Lake.

== History ==
The North Bend school district awarded its first four-year diplomas in the spring of 1908, the first high school in Coos County, Oregon, to do so. The school was operating out of the Central School building at that time. Even prior to that, in the fall of 1907, the school colors of brown and gold were chosen for the school. The superintendent at the time, A.G. Rabb, had graduated from Baldwin College in Ohio, which had those same colors. Raab also instituted a tradition of annually tying a ribbon with the name of each year's graduates to a shovel used to plant a sprig of ivy or a tree to beautify the schools campus.

By the 1909-1910 school year a new building, Kinney High, was built to provide a place of higher education in North Bend, Oregon. Only one student graduated from Kinney High in 1910. A year later the school was renamed North Bend High School when it was discovered that the man who donated the property for the school, Lorenzo D. Kinney, did not have clear title to the land.

In 1928, the high school's letterman club (Order of North Bend) suggested a Bulldog mascot for the school. It was first mentioned in the local newspapers in the fall. It remains the school's mascot.

In October 2020, a number of students were placed into quarantine following coronavirus cases being reported at the school.

== Academics ==
In 1987, North Bend High School was honored in the Blue Ribbon Schools Program, the highest honor a school can receive in the United States.

In 2008, 78% of the school's seniors received their high school diploma. Of 198 students, 154 graduated, 28 dropped out, 3 received a modified diploma, and 13 are still in high school.

== Athletics ==
North Bend High School athletic teams compete in the OSAA 4A-4 Sky Em League.

In addition to their Athletic awards, North Bend has won the OSAA Cup 2 times for the 2013-14 school year and the 2016-17 school year.

=== State championships ===
- Band: 2014, 2015, 2016, 2017, 2023, 2024, 2025 2026
- Boys Swimming: 2011
- Boys Track and Field: 2014, 2019
- Boys Cross Country: 2006, 2007
- Football: 2016
- Girls Basketball: 2005
- Girls Swimming: 2007, 2013, 2015, 2018
- Speech: 2013, 2014
- Volleyball: 2006
- Wrestling: 1979

== Notable alumni ==
- Sheila Bleck (b. 1974), professional bodybuilder
- Bill Borcher (1919–2003), University of Oregon basketball coach
- John Hunter (b. 1965), offensive lineman in the National Football League (NFL)
- Rudy Ruppe (1925–1976), collegiate football player, coach, and school administrator
