= Georg Seelig =

- Education: University of Basel
- Scientific career
- Fields: Synthetic biologist, DNA nanotechnology
- Workplaces: University of Washington

Georg Seelig is a Swiss computer scientist, bioengineer, and synthetic biologist. He is the Chris & Heidi Stolte Professor in Computer Science & Engineering at the University of Washington. He is a researcher in the field of DNA nanotechnology.

== Life ==
He graduated from University of Basel with a Diploma in Physics in 1998 and did his PhD on condensed matter Physics from University of Geneva in 2003. He was a post doctoral associate in the lab of Professor Erik Winfree at California Institute of Technology between 2003 and 2009 . He has won the prestigious NSF CAREER award in 2010, the Alfred P. Sloan Research Fellowship in 2011, and the DARPA Young Faculty Award in 2012. He is a part of the Molecular Programming Project.
