= Tenmile, Coos County, Oregon =

Unincorporated community in the state of Oregon, United States

Tenmile, Oregon
- Unincorporated community
- Location within Oregon Location within the United States
- Coordinates: 43°34′34″N 124°11′44″W
- Country: United States
- State: Oregon
- County: Coos
- Elevation: 16 ft (4.9 m)
- Time zone: UTC-8 (Pacific (PST))
  - Summer (DST): UTC-7 (PDT)
- Area codes: 458 and 541
- GNIS feature ID: 1154644
- Coordinates and elevation from Geographic Names Information System

Tenmile is an unincorporated community in Coos County, Oregon, United States. It is about 8 miles (13 km) south of Winchester Bay and one mile (1.6 km) west of Lakeside, on U.S. Route 101 next to Tenmile Creek and the Oregon Dunes. Tenmile Lake was named for Tenmile Creek, which was said to be ten miles south of Winchester Bay.
