= St. James Episcopal Church (Coquille, Oregon) =

Historic church in Oregon, United States

- U.S. National Register of Historic Places
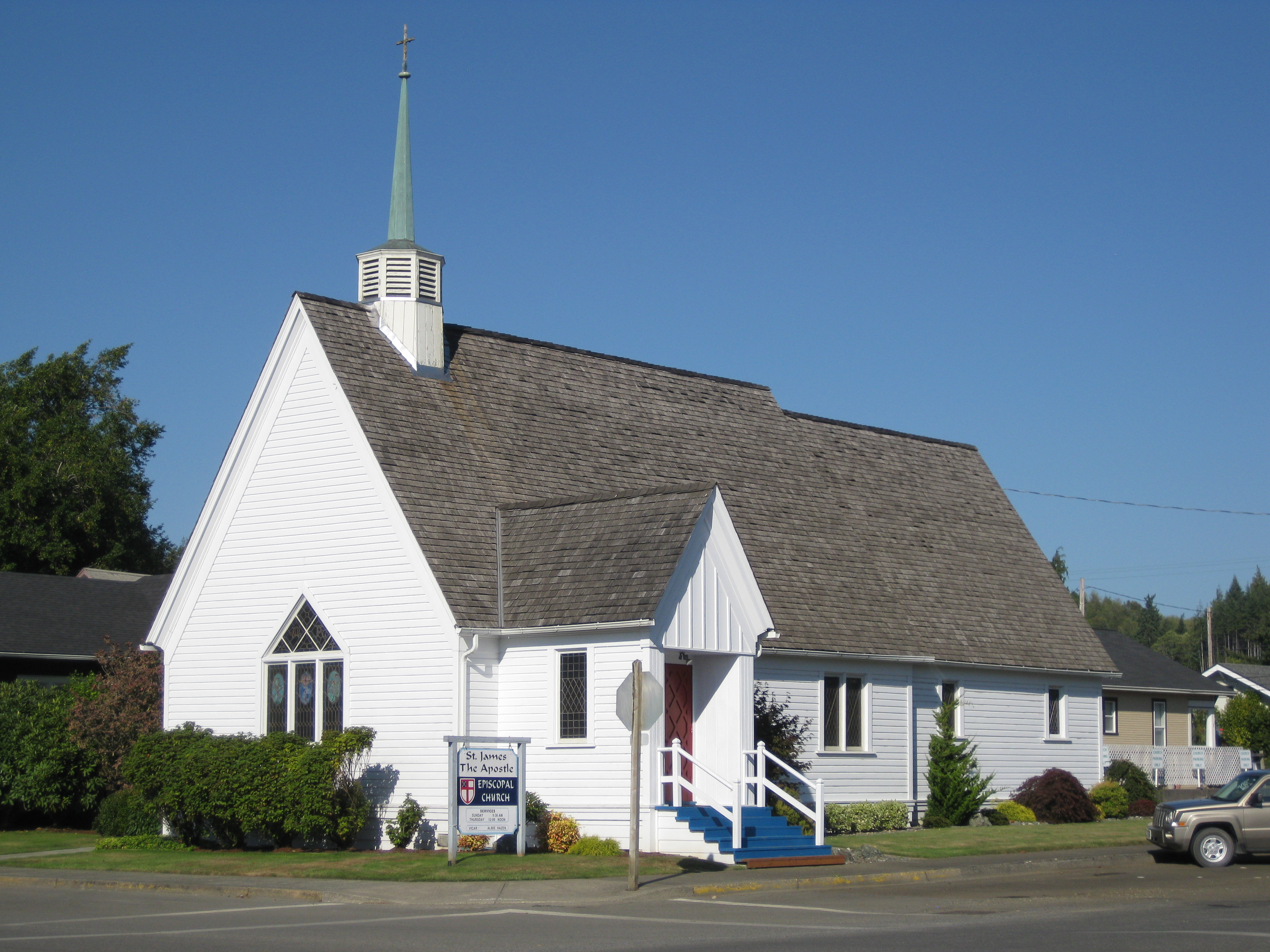
- St. James Episcopal Church in 2012
- Location: 210 E. 3rd Street; Coquille, Oregon
- Coordinates: 43°10′38″N 124°11′12″W
- Area: 0.2 acres (0.081 ha)
- Built: 1897
- Architectural style: Late Gothic Revival
- MPS: Coquille MPS
- NRHP reference No.: 92001316
- Added to NRHP: October 14, 1992

St. James Episcopal Church (also known as St. James the Apostle Episcopal Church) is a historic church at 210 E. Third Street in Coquille, Oregon. The parish is a member of the Episcopal Church (United States), and part of the worldwide Anglican Communion.

It was built in 1897 and added to the National Register of Historic Places in 1992.

A search is underway to replace Father Timothy Hannon, who served the people of Coquille from July, 2018, to March, 2021.
