= Green Acres, Coos County, Oregon =

Unincorporated community in the state of Oregon, United States

Green Acres, Oregon
- Unincorporated community
- Location within the state of Oregon Green Acres (the United States)
- Coordinates: 43°15′27″N 124°12′17″W
- Country: United States
- State: Oregon
- County: Coos
- Elevation: 23 ft (7.0 m)
- Time zone: UTC-8 (Pacific (PST))
  - Summer (DST): UTC-7 (PDT)
- GNIS feature ID: 1143020

Green Acres (or Greenacres) is an unincorporated community in Coos County, Oregon, United States, east of Oregon Route 42 between Coos Bay and Coquille. It is near the southernmost point of the Isthmus Slough of Coos Bay.

The area that is now Green Acres was a 700-acre (2.8 km^{2}) farm homesteaded by master shipbuilder John Kruse, a Danish immigrant, in the late 19th century. Kruse was best known for building the Western Shore for Asa Meade Simpson. The three-masted wooden clipper ship was one of the largest tall ships ever built on the West Coast of the United States. She set several speed records.

Today the community has a Grange hall, a volunteer fire department, and a community church. The community formerly had a school in the Coos Bay School District that closed in 1985. Green Acres is also home to the Noble Creek Fish Hatchery.
