= Seelig–Byler House =

- Seelig--Byler House
- U.S. National Register of Historic Places
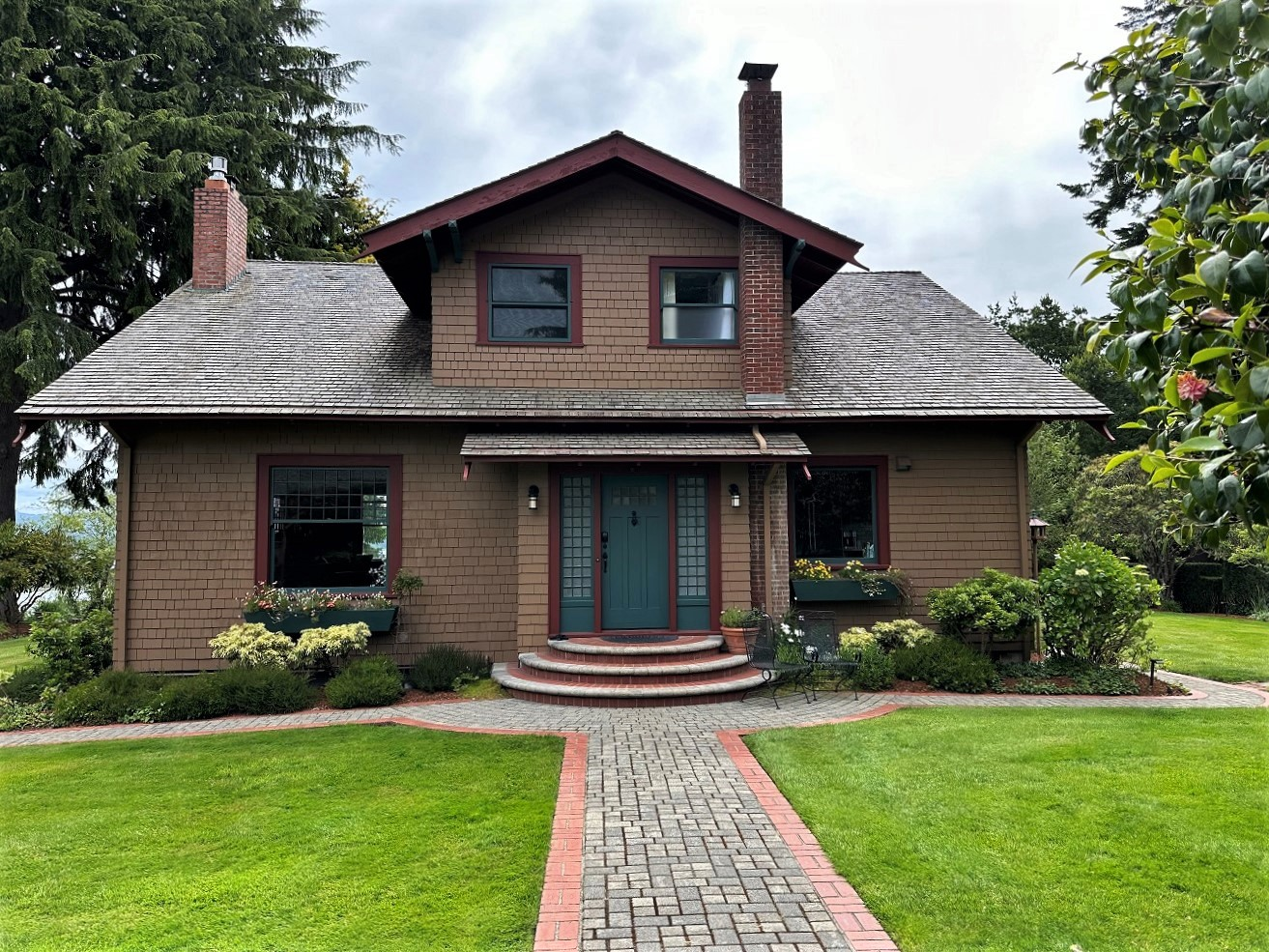
- Seelig-Byler House in 2024

- Location within Oregon Location within the United States
- Location: 1920 N. Fourteenth St. Coos Bay, Oregon
- Coordinates: 43°22′54″N 124°13′34″W
- Area: 2 acres (0.81 ha)
- Built: c.1909
- Built by: Turpen, William S. "Bud"
- Architectural style: Bungalow/craftsman
- NRHP reference No.: 93001510
- Added to NRHP: January 21, 1994

The Seelig–Byler House, also known as the Albert Seelig House, at 1920 N. Fourteenth St. in Coos Bay, Oregon, was built in about 1909. It was listed on the National Register of Historic Places in 1994.

It was designed by local architect William S. "Bud" Turpen and is Bungalow/Craftsman architecture in style.

It is a two-story, cedar shingle-clad house. It was built for Albert Seelig, "an enterprising German-born bookkeeper and collection agent for a local liquor wholesaler."
