= Fairview, Coos County, Oregon =

Unincorporated community in the state of Oregon, United States

Fairview, Oregon
- Unincorporated community
- Location within Oregon Location within the United States
- Coordinates: 43°13′00″N 124°04′25″W
- Country: United States
- State: Oregon
- County: Coos
- Elevation: 131 ft (40 m)
- Time zone: UTC-8 (Pacific (PST))
  - Summer (DST): UTC-7 (PDT)
- Area code: 541
- GNIS feature ID: 1120567
- Coordinates and elevation from Geographic Names Information System

Fairview is an unincorporated community in Coos County, Oregon, United States. Fairview is along the North Fork Coquille River about 6 miles (10 km) northeast of Coquille.

According to Oregon Geographic Names, the community's name is descriptive. A local logging railroad once connected Fairview to the Southern Pacific rail network at Fairview Junction near Coquille. A post office opened in Fairview in 1873, with Francis Braden as the first postmaster. The post office name in Coos County led to complications in Fairview in Multnomah County, where the post office at the Fairview railway station was temporarily named Cleone to avoid using the same name for two different post offices. The Coos County office closed in 1913, and the Cleone office became the Fairview office in 1914.
