= Remote, Oregon =

Unincorporated community in the state of Oregon, United States

- Unincorporated community
- Location within the state of Oregon Remote (the United States)
- Coordinates: 43°00′21″N 123°53′33″W
- Country: United States
- State: Oregon
- County: Coos
- Elevation: 246 ft (75 m)
- Time zone: UTC-8 (Pacific (PST))
  - Summer (DST): UTC-7 (PDT)
- GNIS feature ID: 1125943

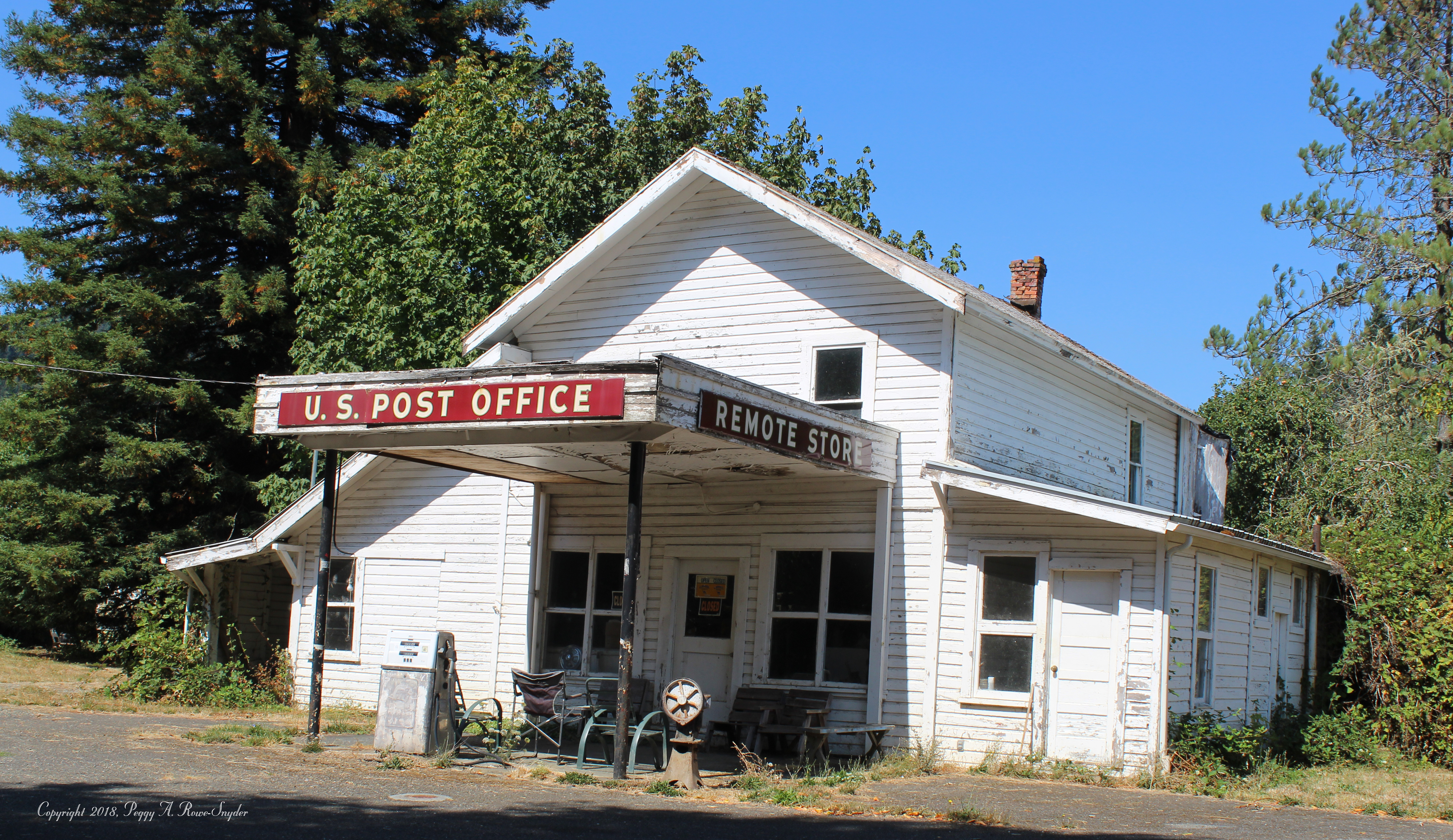
The post office, store, and gas station in Remote, Oregon.

Remote is an unincorporated hamlet in Coos County in the U.S. state of Oregon. It lies near the confluence of Sandy Creek with the Middle Fork Coquille River.

Remote was named by local pioneers for its distance from other settlements. Its post office was established in 1887. A new post office, besides a store, gas station, and unofficial town hall building, was built in 1924 by L. D. Jennings.

Oregon Route 42 used to run through the center of the community, but realignment of the highway has left Remote several hundred yards away, along a side road, around a bend and down below the highway, largely shielded by trees from highway view.

The town now consists of a combined store with gas pump and post office (closed in 1998), and a couple of houses. The Sandy Creek Covered Bridge is nearby.

Like Oregon communities Nimrod and Boring, Remote is often cited on lists of odd place names.

In the early twenty-first century, the city is being used as a stand-in location on job boards to indicate that the position is a remote work position. Since 2020, the number of job postings with Remote as a placeholder had substantially increased due to an increase in hiring for remote-work positions during the COVID-19 pandemic.
