= Coos County, Oregon =

County in Oregon, United States

- County
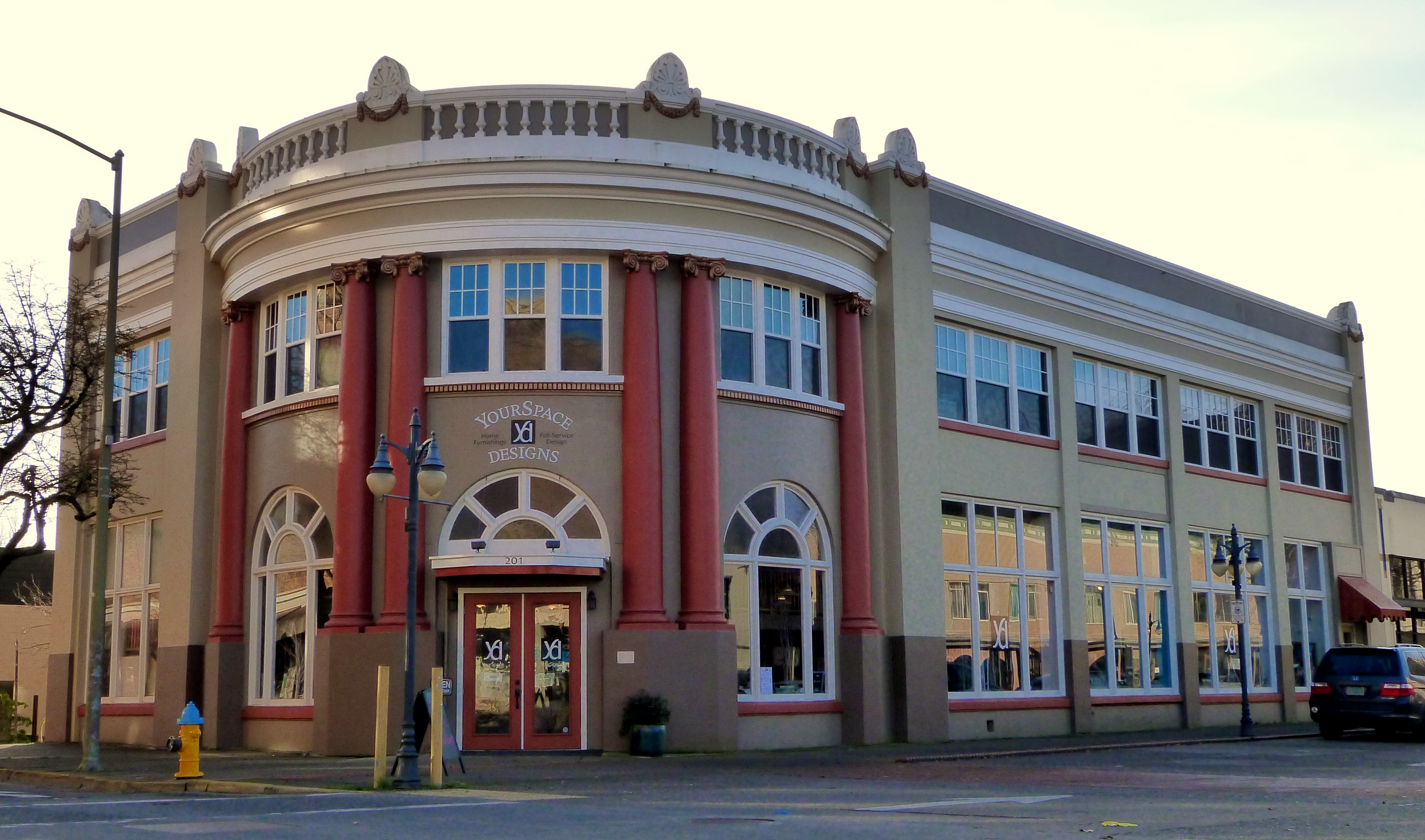
- Historic Coos Bay National Bank Building.

- Location within the U.S. state of Oregon
- Coordinates: 43°11′N 124°05′W
- Country: United States
- State: Oregon
- Founded: December 22, 1853
- Named for: Coos people
- Seat: Coquille
- Largest city: Coos Bay

Area
  - Total: 1,806 sq mi (4,680 km^{2})
  - Land: 1,596 sq mi (4,130 km^{2})
  - Water: 210 sq mi (540 km^{2}) 12%

Population (2020)
  - Total: 64,929
  - Estimate (2025): 63,992 ▼
  - Density: 40.68/sq mi (15.71/km^{2})
- Time zone: UTC−8 (Pacific)
  - Summer (DST): UTC−7 (PDT)
- Congressional district: 4th
- Website: www.co.coos.or.us

Coos County (/kuːs/ KOOSS) is one of the 36 counties in the U.S. state of Oregon. As of the 2020 census, the population was 64,929. The county seat is Coquille. The county was formed from the western parts of Umpqua and Jackson counties. It is named after a tribe of Native Americans who live in the region. Coos County comprises the Coos Bay-North Bend, OR Micropolitan Statistical Area.

== History ==
Coos Bay is the homeland of two bands of Native people, Miluk and Hanis. Both today are often referred to as "Coos". Lewis and Clark noted Cook-koo-oose for Coos Bay people. The origin of the name "Coos" is probably influenced both by the Lewis and Clark reference and the name for the region in the Hanis and Miluk languages, kuukwis. Early maps and documents spelled it Kowes, Cowes, Coose, Koos, among others.

Although exploration and trapping in the area occurred as early as 1828, the first European-American settlement was established at Empire City in 1853 by members of the Coos Bay Company; this is now part of the city of Coos Bay.

Coos County was created by the Territorial Legislature from parts of Umpqua, and Jackson counties on December 22, 1853. Curry County, Oregon, was created from the southern part in 1855. The county seat was originally at Empire City. In 1895 the legislature permitted the citizens of the county to choose a new county seat. The 1896 vote resulted in moving the seat to Coquille.

The Territorial Legislature granted permission for the development of wagon roads from Coos Bay to Jacksonville, Oregon, in 1854, and to Roseburg, Oregon, in 1857.

In 1996, it was the site of one of the worst mass murders in Oregon’s history. Girley Crum Jr., broken into the home of his ex girlfriend, and murdered her and her family. He was convicted of the crime and sentenced to life imprisonment without parole.

== Geography ==
According to the United States Census Bureau, the county has a total area of 1,806 square miles (4,680 km^{2}), of which 1,596 square miles (4,130 km^{2}) is land and 210 square miles (540 km^{2}) (12%) is water.

=== Adjacent counties ===
- Douglas County - north and east
- Curry County - south

=== National protected areas ===
- Bandon Marsh National Wildlife Refuge
- Oregon Islands National Wildlife Refuge (part)
- Siskiyou National Forest (part)
- Siuslaw National Forest (part)

== Demographics ==
Historical population
Census	Pop.	Note	%±
1860	445		—
1870	1,644		269.4%
1880	4,834		194.0%
1890	8,874		83.6%
1900	10,324		16.3%
1910	17,959		74.0%
1920	22,257		23.9%
1930	28,373		27.5%
1940	32,466		14.4%
1950	42,265		30.2%
1960	54,955		30.0%
1970	56,515		2.8%
1980	64,047		13.3%
1990	60,273		−5.9%
2000	62,779		4.2%
2010	63,043		0.4%
2020	64,929		3.0%
2025 (est.)	63,992	▼	−1.4%
U.S. Decennial Census; 1790–1960 1900–1990; 1990–2000 2010–2020

=== 2020 census ===
As of the 2020 census, the county had a population of 64,929. The median age was 49.1 years. 17.8% of residents were under the age of 18 and 27.3% of residents were 65 years of age or older. For every 100 females there were 98.2 males, and for every 100 females age 18 and over there were 97.2 males age 18 and over. 61.9% of residents lived in urban areas, while 38.1% lived in rural areas.

The racial makeup of the county was 84.6% White, 0.4% Black or African American, 2.3% American Indian and Alaska Native, 1.2% Asian, 0.2% Native Hawaiian and Pacific Islander, 2.4% from some other race, and 8.9% from two or more races. Hispanic or Latino residents of any race comprised 6.6% of the population.

There were 27,662 households in the county, of which 22.6% had children under the age of 18 living with them and 26.7% had a female householder with no spouse or partner present. About 31.0% of all households were made up of individuals and 16.9% had someone living alone who was 65 years of age or older.

There were 31,378 housing units, of which 11.8% were vacant. Among occupied housing units, 66.4% were owner-occupied and 33.6% were renter-occupied. The homeowner vacancy rate was 1.7% and the rental vacancy rate was 5.0%.

Coos County, Oregon – Racial and ethnic composition Note: the US Census treats Hispanic/Latino as an ethnic category. This table excludes Latinos from the racial categories and assigns them to a separate category. Hispanics/Latinos may be of any race.
Race / Ethnicity (NH = Non-Hispanic)	Pop 1980	Pop 1990	Pop 2000	Pop 2010	Pop 2020	% 1980	% 1990	% 2000	% 2010	% 2020
White alone (NH)	61,003	56,879	56,616	54,820	53,538	95.25%	94.37%	90.18%	86.96%	82.46%
Black or African American alone (NH)	72	133	169	234	259	0.11%	0.22%	0.27%	0.37%	0.40%
Native American or Alaska Native alone (NH)	1,308	1,338	1,412	1,467	1,320	2.04%	2.22%	2.25%	2.33%	2.03%
Asian alone (NH)	455	556	553	644	728	0.71%	0.92%	0.88%	1.02%	1.12%
Native Hawaiian or Pacific Islander alone (NH)	x	x	99	104	120	x	x	0.16%	0.16%	0.18%
Other race alone (NH)	85	14	66	75	316	0.13%	0.02%	0.11%	0.12%	0.49%
Mixed race or Multiracial (NH)	x	x	1,731	2,308	4,356	x	x	2.76%	3.66%	6.71%
Hispanic or Latino (any race)	1,124	1,353	2,133	3,391	4,292	1.75%	2.24%	3.40%	5.38%	6.61%
Total	64,047	60,273	62,779	63,043	64,929	100.00%	100.00%	100.00%	100.00%	100.00%

=== American Community Survey 2025 data ===
The United States Census Bureau estimated that in 2025, Coos County’s population was 63.992. It was also estimated that the county's population was 81,44% Non-Hispanic White, 8,53% Hispanic or Latino, 0,54% Non-Hispanic Black, 1,43% Asian, 2,06% Native American, 0,20% Pacific Islander, and 5,81% Multiracial.

Total	Population	Percentage
Non-Hispanic White	52.113	81,44%
Hispanic or Latino	5.459	8,53%
Non-Hispanic Black	345	0,54%
Asian	915	1,43%
Native American	1.317	2,06%
Pacific Islander	126	0,20%
Non-Hispanic Multiracial	3.717	5,81%

=== 2010 census ===
As of the 2010 census, there were 63,043 people, 27,133 households, and 16,857 families living in the county. The population density was 39.5 inhabitants per square mile (15.3/km^{2}). There were 30,593 housing units at an average density of 19.2 units per square mile (7.4 units/km^{2}). The racial makeup of the county was 89.8% white, 2.5% Native American, 1.0% Asian, 0.4% black or African American, 0.2% Pacific islander, 1.7% from other races, and 4.3% from two or more races. Those of Hispanic or Latino origin made up 5.4% of the population. In terms of ancestry, 22.9% were German, 15.0% were English, 12.7% were Irish, 7.4% were American, and 5.2% were Scottish.

Of the 27,133 households, 24.2% had children under the age of 18 living with them, 47.2% were married couples living together, 10.2% had a female householder with no husband present, 37.9% were non-families, and 29.8% of all households were made up of individuals. The average household size was 2.29 and the average family size was 2.78. The median age was 47.3 years.

The median income for a household in the county was $37,491 and the median income for a family was $46,569. Males had a median income of $39,744 versus $28,328 for females. The per capita income for the county was $21,981. About 11.5% of families and 16.4% of the population were below the poverty line, including 21.4% of those under age 18 and 8.1% of those age 65 or over.

=== 2000 census ===
As of the 2000 census, there were 62,779 people, 26,213 households, and 17,457 families living in the county. The population density was 39 people per square mile (15 people/km^{2}). There were 29,247 housing units at an average density of 18 units per square mile (6.9/km^{2}). The racial makeup of the county was 91.97% White, 0.31% Black or African American, 2.41% Native American, 0.90% Asian, 0.17% Pacific Islander, 1.06% from other races, and 3.17% from two or more races. 3.40% of the population were Hispanic or Latino of any race. 18.5% were of German, 12.4% English, 11.3% Irish and 10.7% U.S. or American ancestry. 96.0% spoke English and 2.5% Spanish as their first language.

There were 26,213 households, out of which 26.00% had children under the age of 18 living with them, 52.90% were married couples living together, 9.90% had a female householder with no husband present, and 33.40% were non-families. 27.20% of all households were made up of individuals, and 12.30% had someone living alone who was 65 years of age or older. The average household size was 2.34 and the average family size was 2.80.

In the county, the population dispersal was 21.90% under the age of 18, 7.10% from 18 to 24, 24.00% from 25 to 44, 27.80% from 45 to 64, and 19.10% who were 65 years of age or older. The median age was 43 years. For every 100 females there were 96.10 males. For every 100 females age 18 and over, there were 93.90 males. The median income for a household in the county was $31,542, and the median income for a family was $38,040. Males had a median income of $32,509 versus $22,519 for females. The per capita income for the county was $17,547. About 11.10% of families and 15.00% of the population were below the poverty line, including 19.90% of those under age 18 and 9.40% of those age 65 or over.

== Communities ==
=== Cities ===
- Bandon
- Coos Bay
- Coquille (county seat)
- Lakeside
- Myrtle Point
- North Bend
- Powers

=== Census-designated places ===
- Barview
- Bunker Hill
- Glasgow
- Saunders Lake

=== Other unincorporated communities ===
- Allegany
- Arago
- Beaver Hill
- Bridge
- Broadbent
- Charleston
- Cooston
- Dellwood
- Dora
- Fairview
- Gaylord
- Gravelford
- Green Acres
- Hauser
- Laurel Grove
- Leneve
- Libby
- McKinley
- Millington
- Norway
- Prosper
- Randolph
- Remote
- Riverton
- Sitkum
- Sumner
- Tenmile

== Politics ==
Between the New Deal and Bill Clinton, Coos County strongly favored the Democratic Party. It was one of the few counties in the West to be won by George McGovern in the 1972 presidential election. No Republican presidential candidate obtained a majority in the county between 1956 and 1996, although Ronald Reagan did obtain pluralities in both 1980 and – very narrowly – in 1984. Since the turn of the century it has become a strongly Republican county in Presidential elections as a result of various factors including de-unionization in the timber industry and opposition to environmental policies often championed by Democrats. The last Democrat to win a majority in Coos County was Michael Dukakis in 1988, although Bill Clinton won pluralities in both his elections. Barack Obama, in both of his presidential campaigns, was the most recent Democrat to even break 40 percent of the vote in Coos County.

United States presidential election results for Coos County, Oregon
Year	Republican		Democratic		Third party(ies)	
Year	No.	%	No.	%	No.	%
1880	607	52.28%	554	47.72%	0	0.00%
1884	758	52.38%	638	44.09%	51	3.52%
1888	906	50.42%	779	43.35%	112	6.23%
1892	603	31.70%	299	15.72%	1,000	52.58%
1896	1,105	40.79%	1,558	57.51%	46	1.70%
1900	1,153	53.90%	888	41.51%	98	4.58%
1904	1,712	64.26%	490	18.39%	462	17.34%
1908	1,850	56.94%	894	27.52%	505	15.54%
1912	701	19.17%	1,081	29.56%	1,875	51.27%
1916	3,209	43.61%	3,352	45.56%	797	10.83%
1920	3,272	52.73%	2,297	37.02%	636	10.25%
1924	3,905	48.39%	1,757	21.77%	2,408	29.84%
1928	4,929	60.66%	3,040	37.41%	157	1.93%
1932	3,299	35.49%	5,504	59.21%	493	5.30%
1936	2,576	24.23%	7,167	67.42%	887	8.34%
1940	5,034	38.76%	7,853	60.46%	101	0.78%
1944	4,609	41.06%	6,476	57.69%	140	1.25%
1948	5,536	47.88%	5,453	47.16%	573	4.96%
1952	10,122	55.04%	8,118	44.15%	149	0.81%
1956	9,201	45.14%	11,183	54.86%	0	0.00%
1960	8,751	40.32%	12,893	59.40%	61	0.28%
1964	5,032	23.79%	16,109	76.17%	8	0.04%
1968	8,230	39.40%	10,884	52.10%	1,776	8.50%
1972	10,370	44.67%	11,778	50.74%	1,065	4.59%
1976	9,481	38.35%	14,168	57.30%	1,076	4.35%
1980	13,041	46.28%	11,817	41.94%	3,318	11.78%
1984	13,637	49.88%	13,582	49.68%	120	0.44%
1988	10,153	40.88%	13,996	56.35%	687	2.77%
1992	9,284	31.30%	12,072	40.70%	8,303	27.99%
1996	10,886	39.39%	12,171	44.04%	4,581	16.58%
2000	15,626	53.19%	11,610	39.52%	2,143	7.29%
2004	18,291	54.83%	14,393	43.14%	678	2.03%
2008	15,354	49.61%	14,401	46.53%	1,196	3.86%
2012	14,673	51.15%	12,845	44.78%	1,168	4.07%
2016	17,865	57.05%	10,448	33.37%	3,000	9.58%
2020	21,829	58.88%	14,243	38.42%	1,003	2.71%
2024	20,849	58.34%	13,731	38.42%	1,155	3.23%

In the United States House of Representatives, Coos County in located in Oregon's 4th congressional district, which also includes the more left-leaning Eugene metropolitan area and has been represented by Democrat Val Hoyle since 2023. In the Oregon State Senate, the county is split between the 5th District, represented by Republican Dick Anderson, and the 1st District, represented by Republican David Brock Smith. In the Oregon House of Representatives, it is split between the 9th District, represented by Republican, Boomer Wright, and the 1st District, represented by Republican Court Boice. All legislative seats, as of 2021, are held by Republicans in the Oregon Legislative Assembly.

== Economy ==
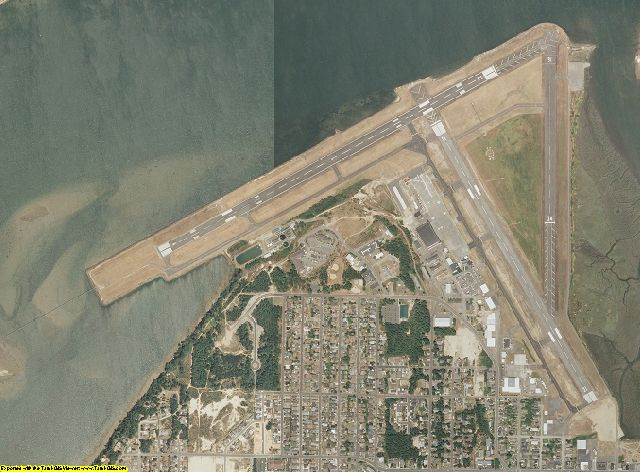
The Southwest Oregon Regional Airport in North Bend

Deposits of gold initially attracted people to the county in the nineteenth century. Between 1890 and 1910, large amounts of coal were mined in the county and shipped to California; production decreased after oil was discovered in that state, and no coal mines in the county have been in production since 1950. These coal fields have been explored for natural gas since 1938, although CDX Gas, a company based in Texas announced in 2003 that they would be drilling two test wells later that year.

A project to build a 60-mile (97 km) natural gas pipeline between the cities of Roseburg and Coos Bay, which would attract new industry to the Coos Bay area, was begun in 1999 when voters approved a local bond measure to raise as much as $27 million, with the state of Oregon providing $24 million. The pipeline construction began in June 2003 and was finished in 2004.

Currently, forest products, tourism, fishing and agriculture dominate the Coos County economy. The service industry is replacing the former lumber-driven economy. Bandon Dunes Golf Resort, north of Bandon and south of Coos Bay, attracts tourists and golfers from around the world. Boating, dairy farming, myrtlewood manufacturing, shipbuilding and repair and agriculture specialty products, including cranberries, also play an important role. Untapped rich deposits of iron ore and lead await development.

The Jordan Cove Energy Project is a project that was met with resistance since 2010 by farm owners and other land owners, tribal natives, and some commercial entities who did not want their land being used or taken without their permission, with eminent domain. The project was cancelled in late 2021.

A current project underway in Coos County, undertaken by Oregon Resources Corporation (ORC), uses modern strip-mining techniques to extract chromite, zircon, and garnet from local sands. The tailings after processing will be returned and re-contoured to replicate pre-mining conditions, and the affected area will be reforested. Job numbers are not listed on the company website but an annual payroll of $3.5 million is listed in the economic impact portion of the FAQ. The Oregon League of Women Voters cited similar numbers from ORC, wholly owned by Industrial Mineral Corporation of Australia; the operation was projected to create 70 to 80 jobs with a salary of $46,000 per year. Efforts to block the project because of health and environmental concerns did not succeed.

There are several port districts in the county: Port of Coos Bay founded in 1909, Port of Coquille River founded in 1912, and Port of Bandon founded in 1913. Coos Bay is considered the best natural harbor between San Francisco Bay and the Puget Sound, and the Port of Coos Bay was the largest forest products shipper in the world until late 2005 when raw log exports via transport ship were suspended.

== Education ==
School districts include:

- Bandon School District 54
- Coquille School District 8
- Coos Bay School District 9
- Myrtle Point School District 41
- North Bend School District 13
- Port Orford-Langlois School District 2J
- Powers School District 31

The community college of the county is Southwestern Oregon Community College.

== Natural history ==
The tallest documented living specimen of a Douglas-fir tree in the world is found 35 miles (56 km) southeast of Coos Bay in the Sitkum area and is slightly more than 100 metres (330 ft) tall.

== See also ==
- National Register of Historic Places listings in Coos County, Oregon
- Steamboats of the Coquille River
- Steamboats of Coos Bay
