= KMHS (AM) =

- Coos Bay, Oregon; United States
- Broadcast area: Coos Bay, Oregon
- Frequency: 1420 kHz
- Branding: 105.1 and 1420 KMHS Pirate Country

Programming
- Format: Country

Ownership
- Owner: Coos Bay Public Schools; (Coos Bay School District No. 9)
- Sister stations: KMHS-FM

History
- Former call signs: KYNG (1992–1992); KRSR (1992–1997)
- Call sign meaning: Marshfield High School

Technical information
- Licensing authority: FCC
- Facility ID: 55243
- Class: D
- Power: 1,000 watts day 41 watts night
- Transmitter coordinates: 43°22′6.4″N 124°12′15.4″W
- Translators: K286CR (105.1 MHz, Coos Bay)

Links
- Public license information: Public file; LMS
- Webcast: Listen Live
- Website: www.kmhsonline.com

KMHS (1420 AM) is a high school radio station broadcasting a classic country music format. Licensed to Coos Bay, Oregon, United States, the station is currently owned by Coos Bay Public Schools. The station broadcasts from studios at Marshfield High School. The station carries coverage of Marshfield High School athletic programs.

== History ==
The station went on the air as KYNG on February 18, 1992. On March 9, 1992, the station changed its call sign to KRSR, and on August 4, 1997, to the current KMHS. When KMHS went on air at Marshfield High School it carried a Top 40 format before transitioning to a hybrid (classics and currents) Country Music format after the school district added a second signal, 91.3 FM, that was student ran and picked up the Top 40 format. 91.3 was licensed to the Coos Bay School District in 2008. They also added an FM Translator for 1420 AM at (K286CR) 105.1 FM.
