= KSHR =

KSHR may refer to:

- The ICAO code for Sheridan County Airport
- KSHR-FM, a radio station (97.3 FM) licensed to Coquille, Oregon, United States
