= Oregon's 5th Senate district =

American legislative district

Oregon's 5th Senate District as of September 27, 2021

District 5 of the Oregon State Senate comprises all of Lincoln County on the central Oregon Coast, as well as parts of Benton, Coos, Douglas, and Lane counties. It is composed of Oregon House districts 9 and 10. It is currently represented by Republican Dick Anderson of Lincoln City.

== Election results ==
District boundaries have changed over time. Therefore, senators before 2021 may not represent the same constituency as today. From 1993 until 2003, the district covered central Washington County; from 2003 until 2013, it shifted to cover the entire Oregon Coast from the Bandon Dunes Golf Resort north to the northern border of Lincoln County while also including small panhandles of Tillamook and Yamhill counties and the Grand Ronde Community in Polk County; and from 2013 until 2023, it extended to cover more of Polk, Tillamook, and Yamhill counties, stretching north to Netarts and the southern parts of Tillamook.

The current district is similar to previous iterations with the exception of the loss of all lands in Polk, Tillamook, and Yamhill counties and the gain of all of Benton County outside of the Corvallis and Adair Village areas, including Philomath.

The results are as follows:

Year	Candidate	Party	Percent	Opponent	Party	Percent	Opponent	Party	Percent
1982	Jeannette Hamby	Republican	100.0%	Unopposed					
1986	Jeannette Hamby	Republican	68.0%	Robert L. Glosenger	Democratic	32.0%	No third candidate		
1990	Jeannette Hamby	Republican	100.0%	Unopposed					
1994	Jeannette Hamby	Republican	100.0%	Unopposed					
1998	Charles Starr	Republican	100.0%	Unopposed					
2004	Joanne Verger	Democratic	51.0%	Albyn Pearn	Republican	49.0%	No third candidate		
2008	Joanne Verger	Democratic	96.8%	Unopposed					
2012	Arnie Roblan	Democratic	54.8%	R. Scott Roberts	Republican	45.1%	No third candidate		
2016	Arnie Roblan	Democratic	48.2%	Dick Anderson	Republican	47.6%	Daniel Souza	Libertarian	4.1%
2020	Dick Anderson	Republican	49.3%	Melissa Cribbins	Democratic	48.5%	Shauleen Higgins	Green	4.1%
2024	Dick Anderson	Republican	53.8%	Jo Beaudreau	Democratic	46.1%	No third candidate		
