= Arnie Roblan =

American politician (born 1948)

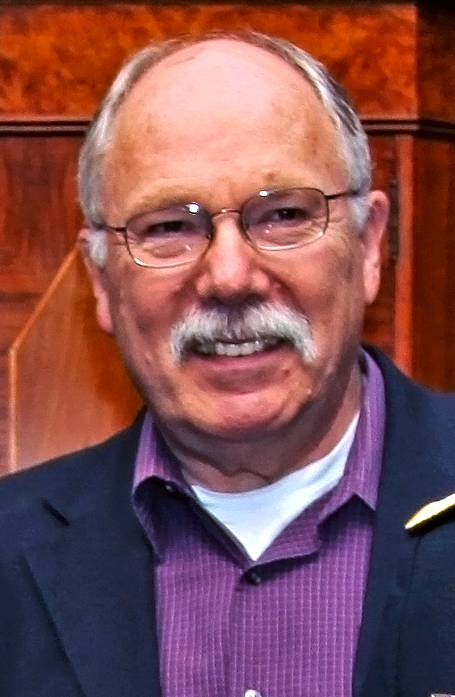
- Roblan in 2013

Member of the Oregon State Senate from the 5th district
- In office January 14, 2013 – January 11, 2021
- Preceded by: Joanne Verger
- Succeeded by: Dick Anderson

Member of the Oregon House of Representatives from the 9th district
- In office January 2005 – January 14, 2013
- Succeeded by: Caddy McKeown

66th Speaker of the Oregon House of Representatives
- In office 2011–2013 Serving with Bruce Hanna
- Preceded by: Dave Hunt
- Succeeded by: Tina Kotek

Personal details
- Born: April 8, 1948 (age 78) Port Angeles, Washington, U.S.
- Party: Democratic
- Spouse: Arlene

Arnold L. "Arnie" Roblan (born April 8, 1948) is an American former educator and a Democratic politician who served as a member of the Oregon House of Representatives from the 9th district, which spans the southern Oregon Coast. He also served as co-speaker of the House for the 2011–2012 session along with Republican Bruce Hanna. He served as a member of the Oregon State Senate from 2013 to 2021.

== Early life and education ==
Roblan was born in Port Angeles, Washington. He attended the University of Washington and the University of Oregon.

== Career ==
Roblan is a former high school principal and math teacher. Roblan was first elected to the Oregon House of Representatives in 2004. In the 2009–2010 session, Roblan served as speaker pro tem. Roblan chaired the Agriculture and Natural Resources Committee and the Rural Policy Committee. He was a member of the Education Committee.

In 2016, Roblan defeated then Lincoln City Councilman Dick Anderson, a Republican, by 30,388 votes to 30,039, 48.2% to 47.7%.

Roblan did not seek re-election in 2020. Anderson ran again and defeated former Coos County Commissioner Melissa Cribbins, a Democrat, 49.4% to 46.5%.

== Personal life ==
He has lived in Coos Bay since the early-1970s with his wife Arlene. They have three children.

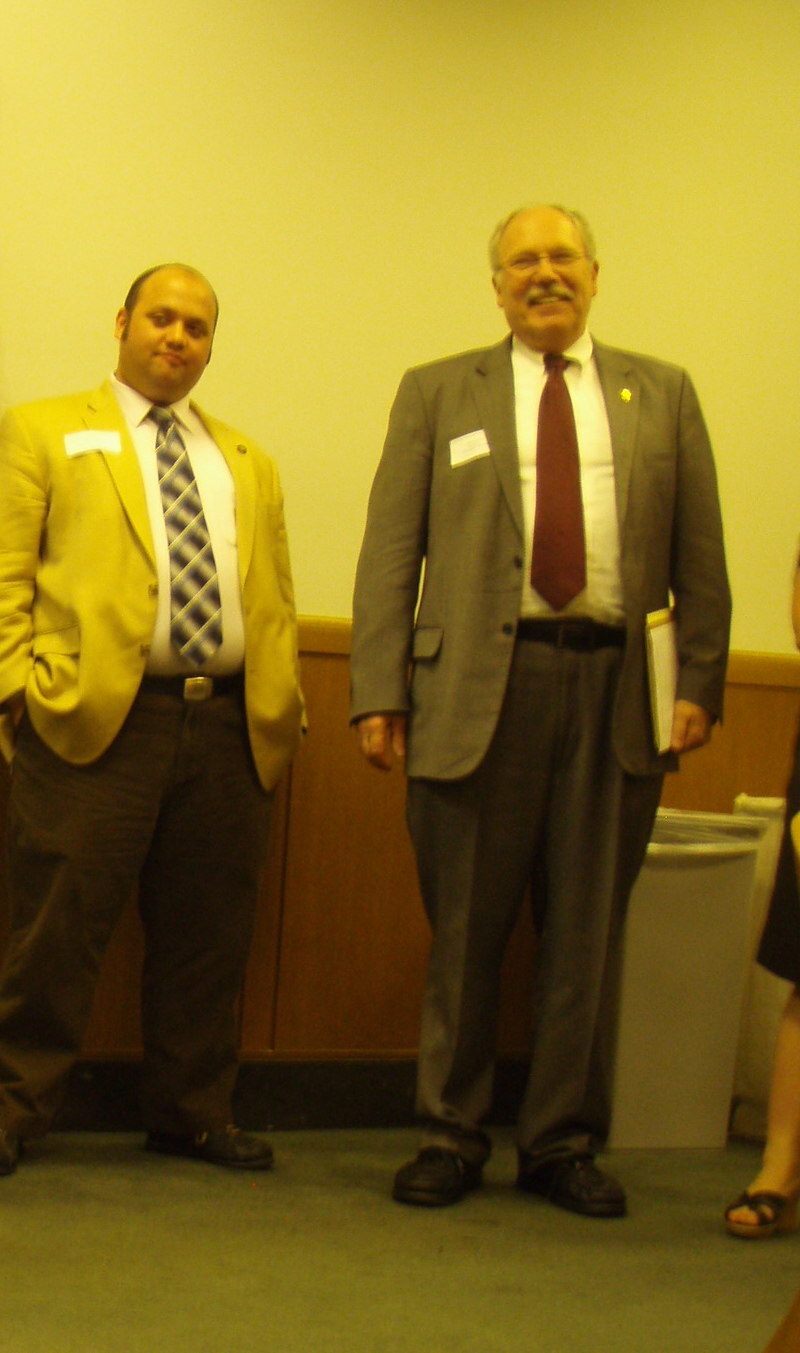
With Rep. Nick Kahl

== Electoral history ==
2004 Oregon State Representative, 9th district
Party	Candidate	Votes	%
Democratic	Arnie Roblan	15,023	51.1
Republican	Susan Massey	14,320	48.7
Write-in		67	0.2
Total votes		29,410	100%

2006 Oregon State Representative, 9th district
Party	Candidate	Votes	%
Democratic	Arnie Roblan	13,340	57.6
Republican	Al Pearn	9,793	42.3
Write-in		32	0.1
Total votes		23,165	100%

2008 Oregon State Representative, 9th district
Party	Candidate	Votes	%
Democratic	Arnie Roblan	15,444	57.4
Republican	Al Pearn	11,365	42.3
Write-in		86	0.3
Total votes		26,895	100%

2010 Oregon State Representative, 9th district
Party	Candidate	Votes	%
Democratic	Arnie Roblan	12,094	52.7
Republican	R Scott Roberts	10,824	47.2
Write-in		37	0.2
Total votes		22,955	100%

2012 Oregon State Senator, 5th district
Party	Candidate	Votes	%
Democratic	Arnie Roblan	30,343	54.8
Republican	Scott Roberts	24,979	45.1
Write-in		92	0.2
Total votes		55,414	100%

2016 Oregon State Senator, 5th district
Party	Candidate	Votes	%
Democratic	Arnie Roblan	30,388	48.2
Republican	Dick Anderson	30,039	47.6
Libertarian	Dan Souza	2,568	4.1
Write-in		99	0.2
Total votes		63,094	100%
