= KBDN =

- Bandon, Oregon; United States
- Broadcast area: Bandon-Coos Bay-North Bend, Oregon
- Frequency: 96.5 MHz
- Branding: Real Country 96.5

Programming
- Format: Country
- Affiliations: Citadel Media

Ownership
- Owner: Bicoastal Media; (Bicoastal Media Licenses III, LLC)
- Sister stations: KBBR, KJMX, KOOS, KSHR-FM, KTEE, KWRO

History
- First air date: 1996
- Former call signs: KAJT (1/13/95-3/10/95, CP)
- Call sign meaning: BanDoN

Technical information
- Licensing authority: FCC
- Facility ID: 13875
- Class: C3
- ERP: 1,500 watts
- HAAT: 395 meters (1296 feet)
- Transmitter coordinates: 42°57′27″N 124°16′13″W

Links
- Public license information: Public file; LMS

KBDN (96.5 FM, "Real Country 96.5") is a radio station licensed to serve Bandon, Oregon, United States. The station is owned by Bicoastal Media and the broadcast license is held by Bicoastal Media Licenses III, LLC.

== Programming ==
KBDN broadcasts a country music format featuring the satellite-delivered "Real Country" format from Citadel Media. In addition to its usual music programming, KBDN airs news updates from CNN Radio.

== History ==
This station received its original construction permit from the Federal Communications Commission on November 17, 1994. The new station was assigned the call letters KAJT by the FCC on January 13, 1995. This was short-lived the station was assigned the current KBDN call letters on March 10, 1995. After a modification and one extension, KBDN received its license to cover from the FCC on January 24, 1997.

In April 2003, Coquille River Broadcasters, Inc., reached an agreement to sell this station and three others to Bicoastal Media through their Bicoastal CB, LLC, subsidiary for a total sale price of $1.5 million. The four-station deal was approved by the FCC on August 22, 2003, and the transaction was consummated on October 16, 2003. At the time of the sale, KBDN broadcast a classic rock music format branded as "B96".

As part of an internal corporate re-organization by the Bicoastal Media parent company, Bicoastal CB, LLC, applied in October 2007 to transfer the broadcast license for KBDN to Bicoastal Media Licenses III, LLC. The transfer was approved by the FCC on October 29, 2007, and the transaction was consummated on the same day.
