= Caddy McKeown =

American politician

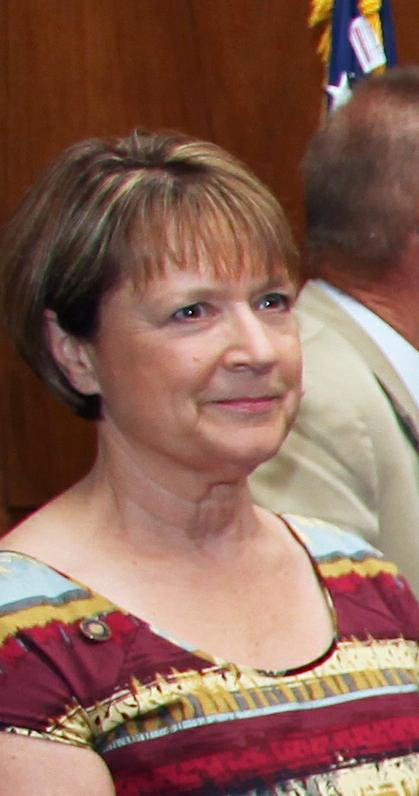

Member of the Oregon House of Representatives from the 9th district
- In office 2012–2021
- Preceded by: Arnie Roblan
- Succeeded by: Boomer Wright

Personal details
- Born: 1951 (age 74–75) Coos Bay
- Party: Democratic
- Spouse: Jeff McKeown
- Education: Oregon State University (B.S.)
- Profession: Former Commissioner, Port of Coos Bay

Caddy McKeown is a Democratic member of the Oregon House of Representatives, representing the 9th district from 2013 to 2021. She was a member of the Coos County school board for 11 years and was the vice chair of the Board of Commissioners of the Oregon International Port of Coos Bay.

== Early life ==
McKeown was born in Coos Bay in 1951. She is a 4th generation Oregonian. Her husband is a former City Councilor and two-term mayor of Coos Bay. She attended the University of Oregon in Eugene, before transferring to Oregon State University where she earned a degree in horticulture in 1974. She was a member of and the board Secretary of the Energy Trust of Oregon.

== Elections ==
McKeown won the 2012 election by 12 points with 52.7% of the vote, having focused on transportation and resource development issues. This was first time she had achieved state office. In 2014, she won by 20 points, taking 57.7%. In 2018, she had a closer race contended by Teri Grier, a former D.C. and Arizona staffer for the corrupt Congressman Rick Renzi, who eventually received a three-year prison sentence. She beat Grier by only 3.6%, taking 49.9% with Grier at 46.3% and Libertarian Guy Rosinbaum at 3.9%. In 2018, in the Democratic primary, she beat outgoing Coos Bay school board member Mark Daily, 80.7% to 17.9%. Daily was mainly concerned with Coos County, but McKeown also was involved with the Douglas, Lane and Lincoln county coastal portions of her district, with their unique needs. Grier was unopposed in the Republican primary.

== Tenure ==
McKeown's influence was significant in the re-opening of the rail link to the Willamette Valley which serves large coastal employers such as Georgia-Pacific, Roseburg Forest Products and the Organic Valley Dairy. As chair of the Transportation & Economic Development Committee, McKeown has focused on overseeing issues salient in her district. Besides serving as chair of the Transportation Committee, she also sits on the Agriculture & Natural Resources Committee, the Higher Education, Innovation, and Workforce Development Committee, the Task Force on Small Business and the Pacific States Marine Fisheries Commission, and chairs the Coastal Caucus. She is a member of the Legislative Commission on Indian Services. She has been heavily involved in forestry issues and with the Oregon Shellfish Task Force since 2015, championing efforts to protect and restoring Oregon's native shellfish population and increase production on a sustainable basis. She is known in particular for having successfully worked across party lines to achieve her goals, including crafting a transportation package that will funnel $150 million over a decade to build and maintain her district's critical roads and bridges. As a representative of numerous retirement communities in her district, she has particularly focused on senior issues.

== Personal life ==
McKeown is married to Jeff McKeown and they have two children, Bradford and Molly.

== Electoral history ==
2012 Oregon State Representative, 9th district
Party	Candidate	Votes	%
Democratic	Caddy McKeown	14,906	54.6
Republican	Nancy Brouhard	11,639	42.6
Libertarian	Guy Rosinbaum	726	2.7
Write-in		33	0.1
Total votes		27,304	100%

2014 Oregon State Representative, 9th district
Party	Candidate	Votes	%
Democratic	Caddy McKeown	13,746	57.7
Republican	Casey Runyan	8,983	37.7
Libertarian	Guy S Rosinbaum	1,027	4.3
Write-in		72	0.3
Total votes		23,828	100%

2016 Oregon State Representative, 9th district
Party	Candidate	Votes	%
Democratic	Caddy McKeown	15,437	49.8
Republican	Teri Grier	14,326	46.2
Libertarian	Guy Rosinbaum	1,197	3.9
Write-in		44	0.1
Total votes		31,004	100%

2018 Oregon State Representative, 9th district
Party	Candidate	Votes	%
Democratic	Caddy McKeown	16,181	54.1
Republican	Teri Grier	13,610	45.5
Write-in		118	0.4
Total votes		29,909	100%
