= Barview, Oregon =

- Census-designated place
- Location of Barview, Oregon
- Coordinates: 43°21′15″N 124°18′47″W
- Country: United States
- State: Oregon
- County: Coos

Area
  - Total: 1.79 sq mi (4.64 km^{2})
  - Land: 1.38 sq mi (3.58 km^{2})
  - Water: 0.41 sq mi (1.06 km^{2})
- Elevation: 69 ft (21 m)

Population (2020)
  - Total: 1,890
  - Density: 1,367.2/sq mi (527.87/km^{2})
- Time zone: UTC-8 (Pacific (PST))
  - Summer (DST): UTC-7 (PDT)
- ZIP code: 97420
- Area codes: 458 and 541
- FIPS code: 41-04400
- GNIS feature ID: 2407800

Barview is a census-designated place (CDP) in Coos County, Oregon, United States. As of the 2020 census, Barview had a population of 1,890.

== Geography ==
Barview is located along the southern Oregon Coast opposite the entrance to Coos Bay. It is 7 miles (11 km) west of the city of Coos Bay via the Cape Arago Highway.

According to the United States Census Bureau, the Barview CDP has a total area of 1.8 square miles (4.6 km^{2}), of which 1.4 square miles (3.6 km^{2}) is land and 0.39 square miles (1.0 km^{2}), or 22.89%, is water.

== Demographics ==
Historical population
Census	Pop.	Note	%±
2020	1,890		—
U.S. Decennial Census

=== 2000 Census data ===
As of the census of 2000, there were 1,872 people, 760 households, and 525 families residing in the CDP. The population density was 1,345.8 inhabitants per square mile (519.6/km^{2}). There were 842 housing units at an average density of 605.3 per square mile (233.7/km^{2}). The racial makeup of the CDP was 91.83% White, 0.21% African American, 3.26% Native American, 1.44% Asian, 0.05% Pacific Islander, 0.59% from other races, and 2.62% from two or more races. Hispanic or Latino of any race were 2.99% of the population. There were 760 households, out of which 24.3% had children under the age of 18 living with them, 53.8% were married couples living together, 9.3% had a female householder with no husband present, and 30.8% were non-families. 23.4% of all households were made up of individuals, and 10.4% had someone living alone who was 65 years of age or older. The average household size was 2.45 and the average family size was 2.82.

In the CDP, the population was 22.4% under the age of 18, 6.6% from 18 to 24, 24.7% from 25 to 44, 28.0% from 45 to 64, and 18.3% who were 65 years of age or older. The median age was 43 years. For every 100 females, there were 107.1 males. For every 100 females age 18 and over, there were 103.8 males. The median income for a household in the CDP was $28,098, and the median income for a family was $30,257. Males had a median income of $28,714 versus $17,347 for females. The per capita income for the CDP was $13,022. About 21.6% of families and 23.1% of the population were below the poverty line, including 24.7% of those under age 18 and 13.0% of those age 65 or over.

== Education ==
The school district is Coos Bay School District 9. The district's comprehensive high school is Marshfield High School.
