= Bruce Anderson (American football) =

American football player (born 1944)

- Anderson in 1968

No. 79, 83
- Positions: Defensive end, Defensive tackle

Personal information
- Born: January 18, 1944 (age 82); Coos Bay, Oregon, U.S.
- Listed height: 6 ft 4 in (1.93 m)
- Listed weight: 250 lb (113 kg)

Career information
- High school: Marshfield (Coos Bay)
- College: Willamette (1962–1965)
- NFL draft: 1966: 6th round, 82nd overall pick

Career history
- Los Angeles Rams (1966); New York Giants (1967–1969); Washington Redskins (1970)

Career NFL statistics
- Fumble recoveries: 4
- Sacks: 15
- Stats at Pro Football Reference

Bruce Albert "Spider" Anderson (born January 18, 1944) is a businessman and former American football player. He was a defensive end in the National Football League (NFL) from 1966 to 1970 for the Washington Redskins, Los Angeles Rams, and New York Giants. A NAIA All-American in 1965, Anderson is a member of the Willamette University Athletic Hall of Fame.

He was a co-owner and team president of the Seattle Sounders of the North American Soccer League in 1983. Anderson's business career included stints as a Wall Street stockbroker and as head of the Coquille Tribe's economic development organization, where he was charged and indicted for misuse of federal funds and improper disposal of asbestos.

== Early life ==
Bruce Anderson was born in Coos Bay, Oregon on January 18, 1944. He was one of a family of three children.

He played high school football for Marshfield High School in Coos Bay, Oregon before playing college football at Willamette University, a private liberal arts college in Oregon where he was a four-year letterman as a member of the school's football team. During his senior season in 1965 he was named a team captain and won post-season honors as an NAIA All-American.

== Professional football career ==
Anderson was drafted in the sixth round of the 1966 NFL draft by the Los Angeles Rams. He saw action in 7 games for the Rams during his 1966 rookie season. He was traded to the New York Giants on September 11, 1967, for a future draft choice.

Anderson played the 1967, 1968, and 1969 seasons for the Giants, emerging as a starter at right defensive end in 1968 before moving to the left side in 1969. During his playing career the 6'4" Anderson was given the nickname "Spider" by coaches because of his long legs and arms.

On August 13, 1970, Anderson was traded again, this time to the Washington Redskins, in exchange for defensive tackle Jim Norton. He saw action in all 14 games for the Redskins, starting in 8 at the right defensive end position.

Anderson was dealt again on August 4, 1971, this time to the New Orleans Saints in exchange for running back Tom Barrington. At the time of the trade, Redskins head coach George Allen indicated that the team had been trying to find a trade partner for Anderson for two months "to give him the chance he wants so badly." Due to the paucity of defensive linemen on the Saints' roster, "Bruce will get his chance," Allen added.

Unfortunately, the 27-year old Anderson failed his team physical due to an existing knee injury, the Saints announced on August 9, leading to his being placed on waivers, effectively ending his NFL career.

During his NFL playing career, Anderson worked in the off-season in public relations for the Control Data Corporation of Los Angeles.

== Business career ==
After his retirement from the league, Anderson became a stockbroker on Wall Street after a fan introduced him to a firm in 1967. He became a real estate investor in the 1970s in Southern California. In January 1983, Anderson and REI executive Jerry Horn purchased a controlling stake in the Seattle Sounders of the North American Soccer League. During his short tenure as co-owner and team president, Anderson fired head coach Alan Hinton and implemented a new logo and colors for the team, which were poorly received by fans. Anderson resigned as president in July and sold his shares a month later amid accusations of unpaid player wages. The team folded in September.

Anderson, a member of the Coquille Tribe, was the chairman of the Coquille Economic Development Corporation in the 1990s and worked to build housing with financial assistance from the U.S. Department of Housing and Urban Development (HUD). An audit from HUD determined that he spent $800,000 from a larger federal grant earmarked for low-income tribal housing on his own properties, a factory, and construction debts on a casino. Anderson was fired from his position with the Coquille Tribe in 1996 and continued his private real estate development ventures in the Pacific Northwest amid ongoing federal investigations. He was indicted by a federal grand jury in 1999 for improper disposal of asbestos used in an old factory that was converted into the Coquille Tribe's casino in Coos Bay, Oregon. Anderson was acquitted by another federal grand jury the following year.

== Legacy and honors ==
Anderson was inducted into the Willamette University Athletic Hall of Fame in 2001.
