= Marv Harris =

American football linebacker

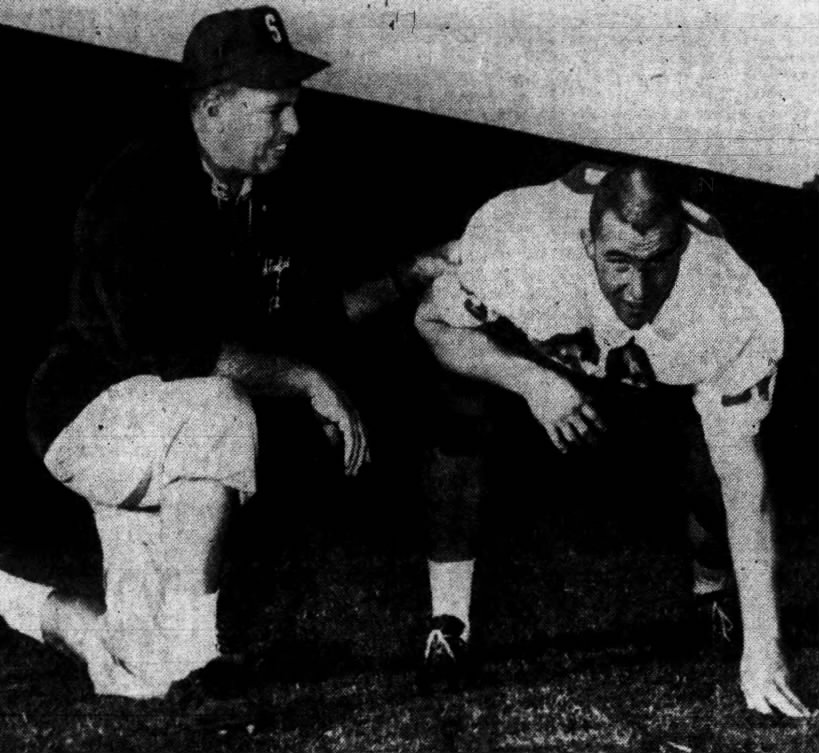
- Harris (right) with Andy Everest, 1962

No. 60
- Position: Linebacker

Personal information
- Born: July 8, 1942 (age 84); Coos Bay, Oregon, U.S.

Career information
- High school: Marshfield
- College: Stanford (1960–1963)

Career history
- Los Angeles Rams (1964)
- Stats at Pro Football Reference

Marvin Keith Harris (born July 8, 1942) is an American professional football linebacker. He played for the Los Angeles Rams of the National Football League (NFL).

== Life and career ==
Harris was born in Coos Bay, Oregon, the son of Keith Harris. He played high school football as a end at Marshfield High School. He then enrolled at Stanford University to play college football for the Stanford Cardinal. He was on the freshman team in 1960, and was a three-year varsity letterman from 1961 to 1963. He majored in civil engineering, and was also the All-Coast lineman from 1962 to 1963.

In December 1963, Harris was selected by the Los Angeles Rams of the National Football League (NFL) in the 13th round of the 1964 NFL draft, and he joined the team. He started one game for the team, and played in fourteen games during the 1964 NFL season. Aside from his football career, he attended night school at the University of California, Los Angeles in 1965.
