= KTEE =

- North Bend, Oregon; United States
- Broadcast area: Coos Bay, Oregon
- Frequency: 94.9 MHz
- Branding: 94.9/95.7 The Beat

Programming
- Format: Rhythmic hot AC

Ownership
- Owner: Bicoastal Media Licenses III, LLC
- Sister stations: KBBR, KBDN, KJMX, KOOS, KSHR-FM, KWRO

History
- First air date: December 10, 1979 (as KOOS at 100.9)
- Former call signs: KOOS (1979–1981); KOOS-FM (1981–1986); KOOS (1986–2007)
- Former frequencies: 100.9 MHz (1979–1986)

Technical information
- Licensing authority: FCC
- Facility ID: 4080
- Class: C1
- ERP: 89,000 watts
- HAAT: 191 meters (627 ft)
- Transmitter coordinates: 43°12′18″N 124°18′07″W
- Translator: 95.7 K239AL (Coos Bay)

Links
- Public license information: Public file; LMS
- Webcast: Listen Live
- Website: ktee.com

KTEE (94.9 FM, "94.9/95.7 The Beat") is a radio station broadcasting a rhythmic hot AC music format. Licensed to North Bend, Oregon, United States, the station is currently owned by Bicoastal Media Licenses III, LLC.

The call letters KTEE were previously held by AM 1260 in Idaho Falls, Idaho, from 1963 to 1991.
