= KWRO =

- Coquille, Oregon; United States
- Frequency: 630 kHz
- Branding: Newstalk 630 & 101.1

Programming
- Format: News Talk Information
- Affiliations: Fox News Radio; Compass Media Networks; Premiere Networks; Salem Radio Network; Westwood One

Ownership
- Owner: Bicoastal Media; (Bicoastal Media Licenses III, LLC)
- Sister stations: KBBR, KBDN, KJMX, KOOS, KSHR-FM, KTEE

History
- First air date: 1948
- Former call signs: KWRO (1947–1982); KSHR (1982–1985); KBEY (1985–1987)

Technical information
- Licensing authority: FCC
- Facility ID: 13874
- Class: D
- Power: 5,000 watts day 46 watts night
- Transmitter coordinates: 43°10′17″N 124°11′54″W
- Translator: 101.1 K266CD (Coos Bay)

Links
- Public license information: Public file; LMS
- Webcast: Listen Live

KWRO (630 AM, "Newstalk 630 & 101.1") is a radio station broadcasting a News Talk Information format. Licensed to Coquille, Oregon, United States, the station is currently owned by Bicoastal Media Licenses Iii, LLC and features programming from Fox News Radio, Compass Media Networks, Premiere Networks, Salem Radio Network, Westwood One, Radio Northwest Network, EIB and more.

KWRO airs University of Oregon football and men's and women's basketball.

== History ==
KWRO was first granted its license on February 17, 1949. The station was assigned the call letters KSHR on 1982-01-18. On 1985-01-04, the station changed its call sign to KBEY and on 1987-05-01 returned to the current KWRO.
