= KBBR =

- North Bend, Oregon; United States
- Broadcast area: Coos Bay, Oregon
- Frequency: 1340 kHz
- Branding: The Jukebox

Programming
- Format: Oldies

Ownership
- Owner: Bicoastal Media; (Bicoastal Media Licenses III, LLC)
- Sister stations: KBDN, KJMX, KOOS, KSHR-FM, KTEE, KWRO

History
- First air date: 1951

Technical information
- Licensing authority: FCC
- Facility ID: 5212
- Class: C
- Power: 1,000 watts
- Transmitter coordinates: 43°25′57.4″N 124°12′34.4″W

Links
- Public license information: Public file; LMS
- Webcast: Listen Live

KBBR (1340 AM) is a radio station broadcasting an oldies format. Licensed to North Bend, Oregon, United States. The station is currently owned by Bicoastal Media, the broadcast license is held by Bicoastal Media Licenses III, LLC.

Previous logo
