= Bunker Hill, Oregon =

Census-designated place in Coos County, Oregon, United States

- Census-designated place
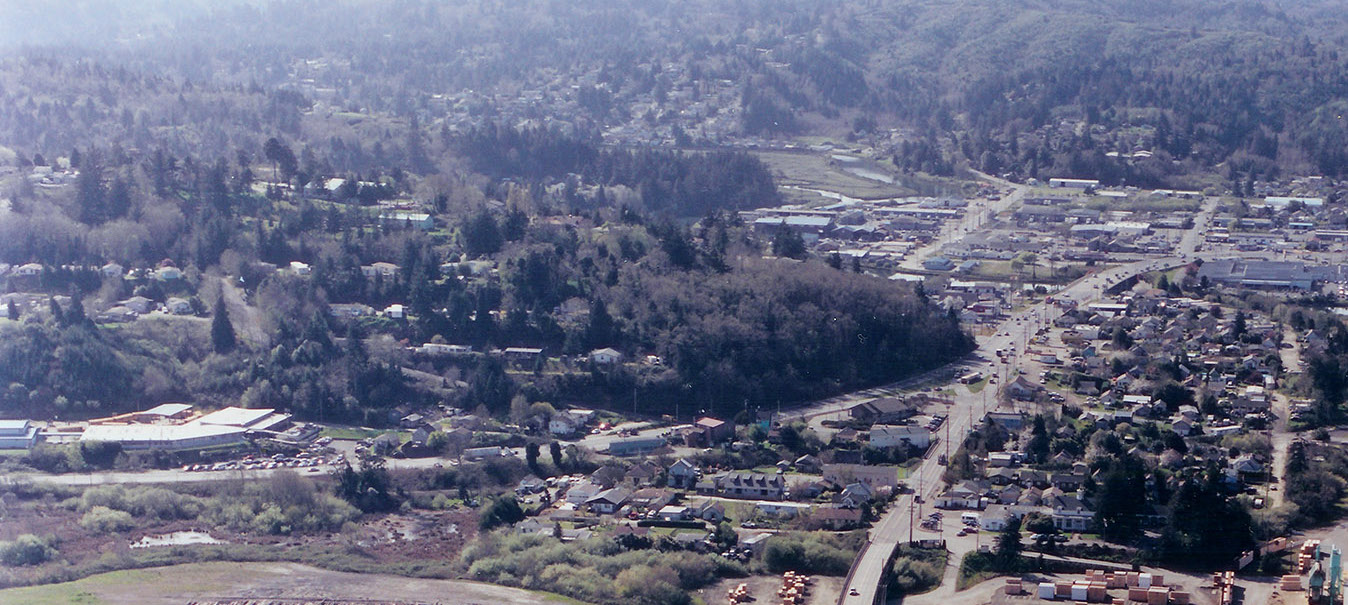
- Aerial view of Bunker Hill from the east in 2005

- Location of Bunker Hill, Oregon
- Coordinates: 43°21′01″N 124°12′30″W
- Country: United States
- State: Oregon
- County: Coos

Area
  - Total: 1.59 sq mi (4.12 km^{2})
  - Land: 1.46 sq mi (3.78 km^{2})
  - Water: 0.13 sq mi (0.34 km^{2})
- Elevation: 128 ft (39 m)

Population (2020)
  - Total: 1,465
  - Density: 1,003.6/sq mi (387.51/km^{2})
- Time zone: UTC−08:00 (Pacific (PST))
  - Summer (DST): UTC−07:00 (PDT)
- ZIP code: 97420
- Area codes: 458 and 541
- FIPS code: 41-09600
- GNIS feature ID: 2407922

Bunker Hill is a census-designated place (CDP) in Coos County, Oregon, United States. As of the 2020 census, Bunker Hill had a population of 1,465.

== Demographics ==
Historical population
| Census | Pop. | Note | %± |
|---|---|---|---|
| 2000 | 1,462 | | — |
| 2010 | 1,444 | | −1.2% |
| 2020 | 1,465 | | 1.5% |
U.S. Decennial Census

=== 2000 Census data ===
As of the 2000 U.S. census, there were 1,462 people, 586 households, and 383 families residing in the CDP. The population density was 990.3 inhabitants per square mile (382.4/km^{2}). There were 633 housing units at an average density of 428.8 per square mile (165.6/km^{2}). The racial makeup of the CDP was 88.58% White, 0.34% African American, 3.35% Native American, 0.68% Asian, 0.07% Pacific Islander, 3.49% from other races, and 3.49% from two or more races. Hispanic or Latino of any race were 6.57% of the population. There were 586 households, out of which 28.5% had children under the age of 18 living with them, 47.3% were married couples living together, 13.7% had a female householder with no husband present, and 34.6% were non-families. 25.6% of all households were made up of individuals, and 10.8% had someone living alone who was 65 years of age or older. The average household size was 2.49 and the average family size was 2.97.

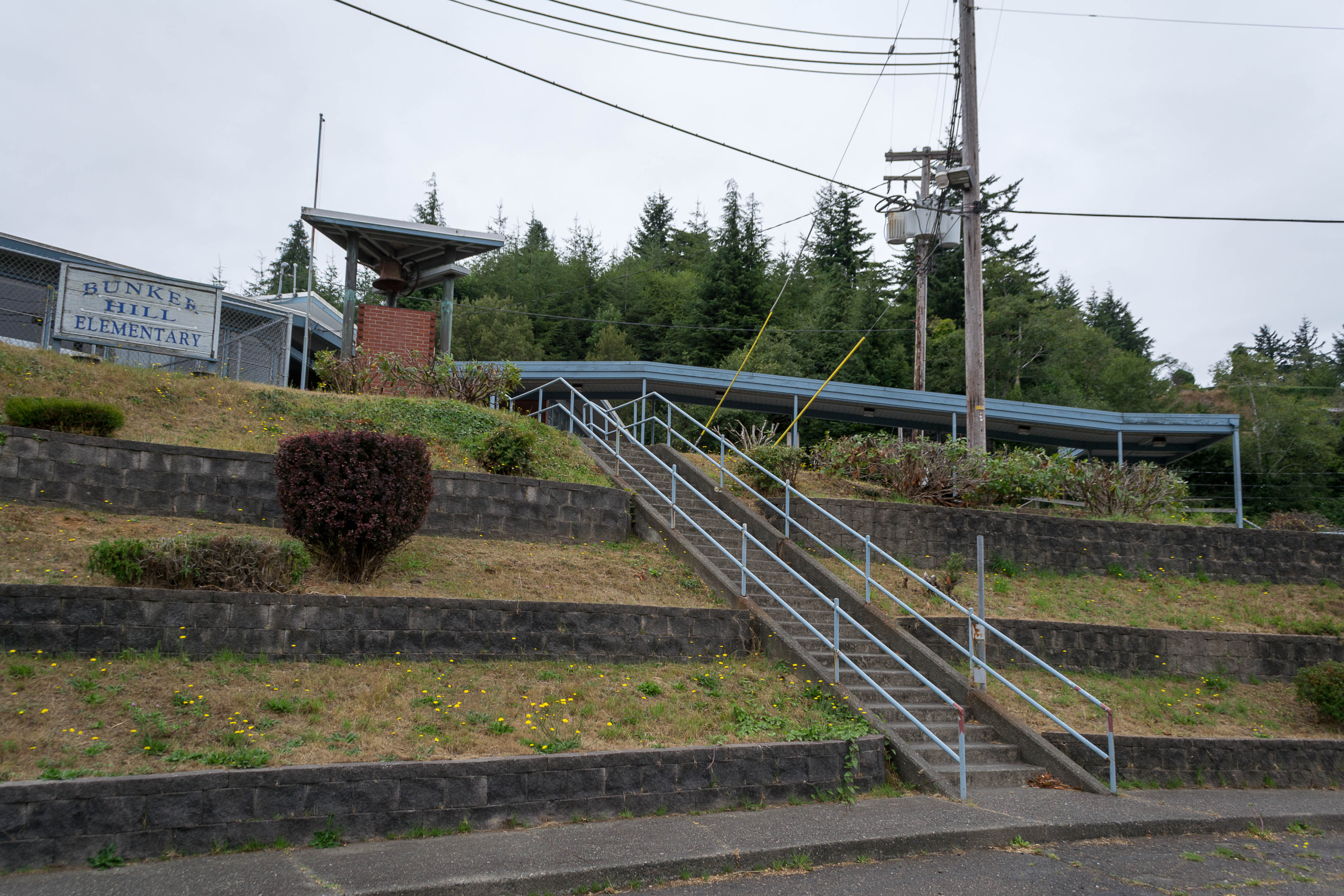
Bunker Hill School, near the foot of Bunker Hill, August 2013

In the CDP, the population was 24.8% under the age of 18, 8.4% from 18 to 24, 28.6% from 25 to 44, 22.2% from 45 to 64, and 15.9% who were 65 years of age or older. The median age was 38 years. For every 100 females, there were 93.1 males. For every 100 females age 18 and over, there were 90.1 males. The median income for a household in the CDP was $24,556, and the median income for a family was $28,600. Males had a median income of $28,750 versus $18,750 for females. The per capita income for the CDP was $10,570. About 23.0% of families and 25.6% of the population were below the poverty line, including 37.3% of those under age 18 and 22.9% of those age 65 or over.

== Geography and climate ==
According to the United States Census Bureau, the CDP has a total area of 1.6 square miles (4.1 km^{2}), of which 1.5 square miles (3.9 km^{2}) is land and 0.1 square miles (0.26 km^{2}) (5.73%) is water.

Climate data for Bunker Hill, Oregon
| Month | Jan | Feb | Mar | Apr | May | Jun | Jul | Aug | Sep | Oct | Nov | Dec | Year |
|---|---|---|---|---|---|---|---|---|---|---|---|---|---|
| Mean daily maximum °F (°C) | 53 (12) | 54 (12) | 56 (13) | 58 (14) | 61 (16) | 64 (18) | 67 (19) | 68 (20) | 68 (20) | 64 (18) | 56 (13) | 52 (11) | 60 (16) |
| Mean daily minimum °F (°C) | 38 (3) | 38 (3) | 39 (4) | 41 (5) | 45 (7) | 49 (9) | 52 (11) | 51 (11) | 48 (9) | 44 (7) | 40 (4) | 37 (3) | 44 (7) |
| Average precipitation inches (mm) | 9.8 (250) | 7.7 (200) | 7.7 (200) | 5.3 (130) | 3.3 (84) | 1.9 (48) | 0.5 (13) | 0.6 (15) | 1.6 (41) | 4.5 (110) | 10.1 (260) | 11.4 (290) | 64.4 (1,640) |
| Average snowfall inches (cm) | 0 (0) | 0.2 (0.51) | 0 (0) | 0 (0) | 0 (0) | 0 (0) | 0 (0) | 0 (0) | 0 (0) | 0 (0) | 0 (0) | 0.1 (0.25) | 0.3 (0.76) |

== Education ==
The school district is Coos Bay School District 9. The district's comprehensive high school is Marshfield High School.

== See also ==
- List of census-designated places in Oregon
