= Larry Haun =

American carpenter

- Born: May 6, 1931; Harrisburg, Nebraska, U.S.
- Died: October 24, 2011 (aged 80); Coos Bay, Oregon, U.S.
- Education: University of California Los Angeles
- Occupation: Carpenter
- Spouses: Renee (m. 1968, died) Mila Haun (m. 1983)
- Children: Eric, Risa, Dario, Sarita, Ninay

Larry Haun (May 6, 1931 – October 24, 2011) was an American union journeyman carpenter and author known for his skills and techniques expressed through his career in production home building as well as his instructional videos and books on the subject.

== Biography ==
Haun was born on May 6, 1931, to Henry and Elizabeth Haun in Harrisburg, Nebraska, where he was raised Catholic.

Haun spent five decades as a production framer during a housing construction boom in California in business with his brothers Joe and Jim. Larry was known for his ability to set a nail with two swings of a hammer. Later in his career, he taught at a community college for 20 years and built homes for Habitat for Humanity. He also contributed to a blog connected to Fine Homebuilding magazine, until his passing. With a local carpenter's union and later with Taunton Press, Haun produced instructional videos and books that detailed production framing in home building. Shortly before his death, he donated most of his tools to a local high school.

An avid marathon runner, Larry ran the Los Angeles Marathon three times while in his 60s. His favorite genre of music was bluegrass. He always had a garden where he lived and encouraged his children to eat organic foods and read books. Larry's wife Mila states that he was interested and involved in Native American culture and as well as Buddhism. He was opposed to the Vietnam War.

Haun died on October 24, 2011, from lymphoma.

== Videos ==
- Framing Walls with Larry Haun. 1992. OCLC 317915694.
- Framing Floors & Stairs with Larry Haun. 2003. OCLC 1249579777.
- Framing Roofs with Larry Haun. 2003. OCLC 779711035.

== Books ==
Haun authored the following books about carpentry:

- Haun, Larry (1998). The Basics of Carpentry. ISBN 9781561581672.
- Haun, Larry (1998). The Very Efficient Carpenter: Basic Framing for Residential Construction. ISBN 9781561583263.
- Haun, Larry; Laurence, Vincent; Snyder, Tim (2008). Habitat for Humanity: How to Build a House. ISBN 9781561589678.
- A Carpenter's Life as Told by Houses. 2012. ISBN 9781600854897.

Scott Wadsworth of Essential Craftsman states that Haun's book The Very Efficient Carpenter gave him great inspiration throughout his career as a professional carpenter, as Haun focused on devising methods and techniques to be more efficient while retaining quality.
