= Camp Castaway =

Former military encampment

Coordinates: 43°23′55″N 124°18′20″W

Camp Castaway was a military encampment at what is now Coos Bay, Oregon, United States. It was established by the survivors of the wreck of the Captain Lincoln, a U.S. transport schooner, on January 3, 1852. The ship began taking on water during a storm while en route from San Francisco to Fort Orford at the town of Port Orford. To avoid sinking, the captain decided to beach the ship north of Cape Arago. All of the roughly 30 troops (U.S. 1st Dragoons, Company C, predecessors to the U.S. Cavalry) on board, and the ship's crew, survived the wreck and most of the cargo was salvaged. At the time no U.S. settlement was present at Coos Bay, so commanding officer Lt. Henry Stanton decided to establish the camp to protect the cargo until it could be transported to Fort Orford, some 50 miles south on the Oregon Coast. The troops and crew used spars, booms and sail cloth from the schooner to build tent structures for housing and for protecting the cargo from winter rains and blowing sand. They named the temporary post Camp Castaway. The camp endured for four months in the open dunes with help from Native Americans of the Coos tribe who traded fresh foods to the soldiers for silverware, biscuits and other nonlocal goods.

The archaeological remains of Camp Castaway were located by archaeologist Scott Byram during a survey in March, 2010, using 150-year-old archival records and maps he studied at the United States Coast Survey archives in Maryland. It was subsequently designated Oregon archaeological site 35CS277. The site is located on land administered by the Bureau of Land Management, Coos Bay District. Following discovery of the site, BLM archaeologist Steve Samuels assembled a team from Southern Oregon University Laboratory of Anthropology, the Confederated Tribes of Coos, Lower Umpqua and Siuslaw Indians, and the Coquille Indian Tribe to excavate the site. Lead archaeologist Mark Tveskov of SOU concluded that the site was Camp Castaway based on the distinctive artifacts recovered. NOAA archaeologists Robert Schwemmer and James Delgado and historian John Cloud are also research team members. A full report of these excavations was due for publication in fall 2014.

== See also ==
- New Carissa, a ship that went aground in the same place as the Captain Lincoln in 1999
