= KOOS =

Coordinates: 43.205°N 124.303°W

- North Bend, Oregon; United States
- Broadcast area: Coos Bay, Oregon
- Frequency: 107.3 MHz
- Branding: 107.3 KOOS FM

Programming
- Format: Hot AC

Ownership
- Owner: Bicoastal Media
- Sister stations: KBBR, KBDN, KJMX, KSHR-FM, KTEE, KWRO

History
- First air date: October 1990 (as KACW)
- Former call signs: KPQA (2/1990-9/1990, CP); KYTE (9/1990-10/1990, CP); KACW (1990–2007)
- Call sign meaning: K COOS Bay

Technical information
- Licensing authority: FCC
- Facility ID: 5210
- Class: C1
- ERP: 51,000 watts
- HAAT: 211 meters
- Translator: 107.7 K299AA (North Bend)

Links
- Public license information: Public file; LMS
- Webcast: Listen Live

KOOS (107.3 FM) is a radio station in North Bend, Oregon, United States. The station is owned by Bicoastal Media. KOOS airs a hot adult contemporary music format.
