= Oregon's 9th House district =

Legislative districts in the state of Oregon

Oregon's 9th House district after redistricting after the 2020 Census

District 9 of the Oregon House of Representatives is one of 60 House legislative districts in the state of Oregon. As of 2021, the boundary for the district includes portions of Coos, Douglas, and Lane counties. The current representative for the district is Republican Boomer Wright of Reedsport.

== Election results ==
District boundaries have changed over time. Therefore, representatives before 2021 may not represent the same constituency as today. General election results from 2000 to present are as follows:

Year	Candidate	Party	Percent	Opponent	Party	Percent	Opponent	Party	Percent	Write-in percentage
2000	Max Williams	Republican	70.67%	Raman Velji	Democratic	29.33%	No third candidate			
2002 (Note: Joanne Verger was the incumbent in this election. She previously represented District 47, but was moved to this district due to redistricting following the 2000 United States census.)	Joanne Verger	Democratic	74.86%	Valorie Holloway	Libertarian	24.29%	No third candidate			0.85%
2004	Arnie Roblan	Democratic	50.99%	Susan Massey	Republican	49.01%	No third candidate			
2006	Arnie Roblan	Democratic	57.60%	Albyn Pearn	Republican	42.30%	No third candidate			0.10%
2008	Arnie Roblan	Democratic	57.42%	Albyn Pearn	Republican	42.26%	No third candidate			0.32%
2010	Arnie Roblan	Democratic	52.67%	Scott Roberts	Republican	47.17%	No third candidate			0.16%
2012	Caddy McKeown	Democratic	54.59%	Nancy Brouhard	Republican	42.63%	Guy Rosinbaum	Libertarian	2.66%	0.12%
2014	Caddy McKeown	Democratic	57.69%	Casey Runyan	Republican	37.70%	Guy Rosinbaum	Libertarian	4.31%	0.30%
2016	Caddy McKeown	Democratic	49.79%	Teri Grier	Republican	46.21%	Guy Rosinbaum	Libertarian	3.86%	0.14%
2018	Caddy McKeown	Democratic	54.10%	Teri Grier	Republican	45.50%	No third candidate			0.39%
2020	Boomer Wright	Republican	57.49%	Cal Mukumoto	Democratic	42.41%	No third candidate			0.10%
2022	Boomer Wright	Republican	60.07%	Jerry Rust	Democratic	39.80%	No third candidate			0.13%
2024	Boomer Wright	Republican	61.8%	William Mrkvicka	Democratic	38.0%	No third candidate			0.2%

== See also ==
- Oregon Legislative Assembly
- Oregon House of Representatives
