= Boomer Wright =

American politician

Member of the Oregon House of Representatives from the 9th district
- Incumbent
- Assumed office January 11, 2021
- Preceded by: Caddy McKeown

Personal details
- Party: Republican
- Spouse: Susan
- Children: Kelli and Byron (with first wife Andrea) Eric and Dallas (with second wife Susan)
- Education: Bachelor's Degree in Education
- Alma mater: Western Oregon University
- Profession: Retired teacher
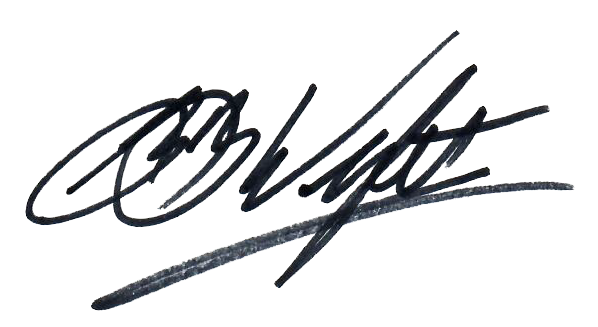
- Signature

Gerald "Boomer" Wright is an American politician serving as a Republican member of the Oregon House of Representatives. He represents Oregon's 9th House district, which covers portions of Coos, Douglas, and Lane Counties on the southern Oregon Coast.

== Biography ==
Wright grew up in Lorane, Oregon after moving there from California at 10. He went to Crow High School and Western Oregon University and got a Bachelor's Degree in Education there in 1972. Boomer worked at Siuslaw Middle School, Rhododendron Elementary, and Siuslaw Primary. He also became superintendent of Mapleton School District. He retired in 2002. Wright had 4 children, 2 with his first wife and 2 with his second. His first wife, Andrea died in 1991 due to a brain tumor.

Wright first won office in 2020 after the retirement of Caddy McKeown from the Oregon House of Representatives.

In January 2026, Wright announced his retirement from the legislature at the end of his term ending on December 31, 2026. He endorsed Oregon House Republican's legislative director, Claire Lynn, for his seat.

== Electoral history ==
2020 Oregon State Representative, 9th district
Party	Candidate	Votes	%
Republican	Boomer Wright	21,724	57.5
Democratic	Cal Mukumoto	15,988	42.3
Write-in		44	0.1
Total votes		37,756	100%

2022 Oregon State Representative, 9th district
Party	Candidate	Votes	%
Republican	Boomer Wright	20,686	60.1
Democratic	Jerry Rust	13,705	39.8
Write-in		45	0.1
Total votes		34,436	100%

2024 Oregon State Representative, 9th district
Party	Candidate	Votes	%
Republican	Boomer Wright	23,115	61.8
Democratic	William (Mrk) Mrkvicka	14,196	38.0
Write-in		86	0.2
Total votes		37,397	100%

Oregon House of Representatives
Preceded by Caddy McKeown	Member of the Oregon House of Representatives from the 9th district 2021–	Succeeded by Incumbent
