= Marshfield High School (Coos Bay, Oregon) =

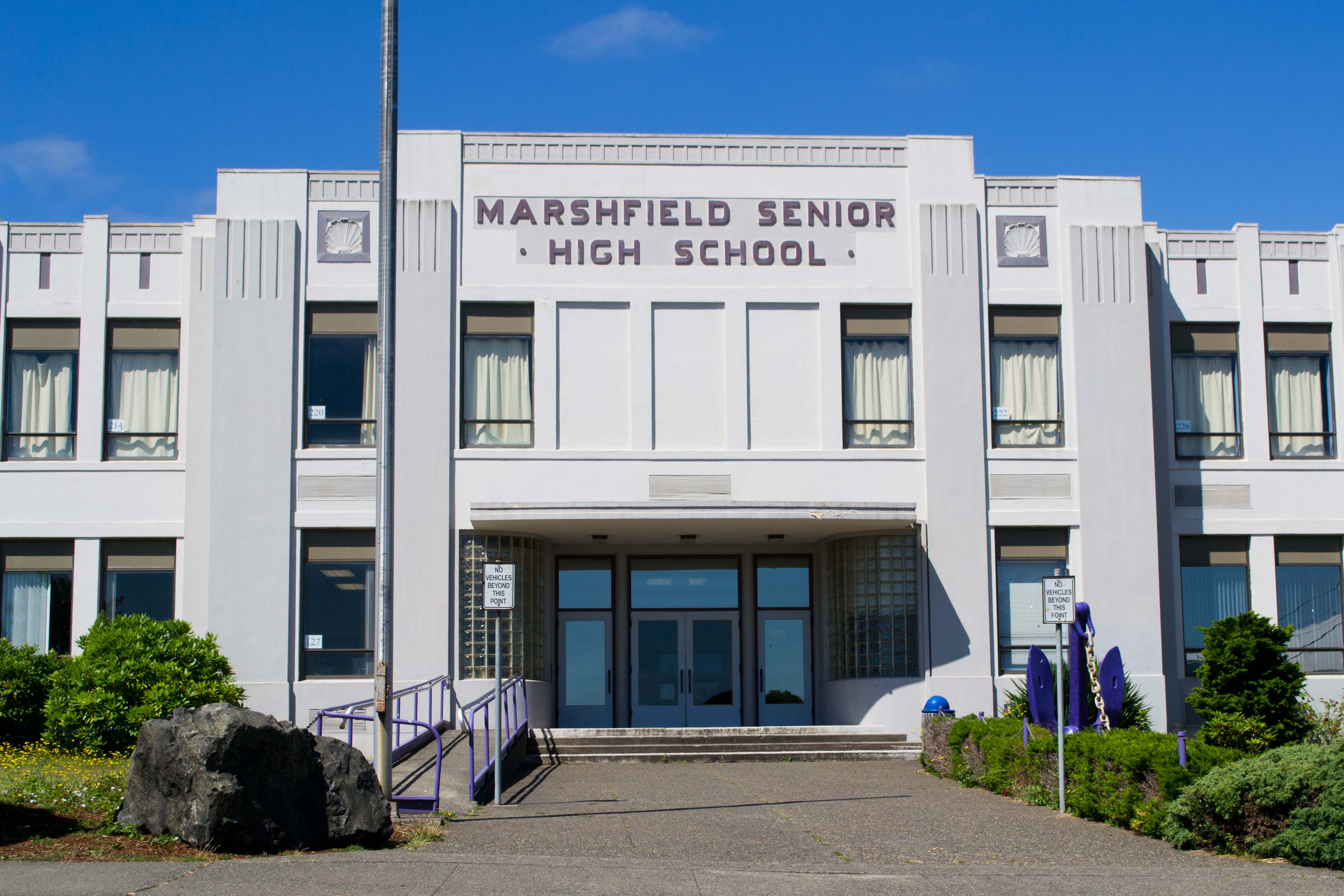

Location
- 10th & Ingersoll; Coos Bay, Coos, Oregon 97420; United States; 43.361023°N 124.221092°W

Information
- Type: Public
- School district: Coos Bay School District
- Principal: Eli Ashton
- Teaching staff: 39.51 (FTE)
- Grades: 9-12
- Enrollment: 835 (2023–2024)
- Student to teacher ratio: 21.13
- Colors: Purple and gold
- Athletics conference: OSAA 4A-4 Sky Em League
- Mascot: Pirates
- Rival: North Bend High School
- Newspaper: The Marshfield Times
- Yearbook: Mahiscan
- Website: http://www.marshfield.coos-bay.k12.or.us/

Marshfield High School is a public high school in Coos Bay, Oregon, United States. Coos Bay is located on the southern Oregon coast. It is a part of the Coos Bay Public Schools school district. Communities in the district include Coos Bay, Barview, and Bunker Hill.

== Campus ==
The campus consists of four major buildings, including an Intermediate building which opened in 2000 that serves as a math and science building. It also has a gymnasium that seats 4,000. There is also a separate facility that houses the Drama program. Marshfield High School started in 1908 after being bought from the International Order of Odd Fellows, who owned the cemetery the school is built around. Construction of the first building later known as the East Branch was finished a year after the purchase and was soon followed by a small gym with a pool in 1915. By 1938, the small building was becoming crowded so the decision was made to make another building. With the help of architect Francis Marion Stokes of Portland Oregon, in 1939, the Main Building and the West Gym were added to the campus. In 1952, the Main Gym was installed in the center of campus. The Main Building was extended onto the north side in 1953, and the west side in 1962. The old East Branch was becoming out dated with the tall pillars and peaked roof compared to the Art Deco style of the rest of the campus, so it was remodeled in 1958. Just before the turn of the century, the school decided to install another building at the north side. The East Branch was becoming old, and the town wanted to keep it around for sentimental value until the plaster ceiling came toppling down onto a desk. Once Pirate Hall was completed in January 2000, the East Branch was relieved of duty, and soon became the parking lot for the students. Heritage Hall was opened in 2014. The Harding Building (built in 1923) was demolished in 2020 and Marshfield Jr. High School was built in its place, which opened on September 7, 2021.

== Media ==
In the November 14, 1977 issue of Time magazine, Marshfield High School was one of three American high schools featured in the cover story, "High Schools in Trouble: A Tale of Three Cities." The eight-page article, titled "High Schools Under Fire: Even outside the big cities, there is trouble everywhere", featured Marshfield under the sub-heading "The Classroom Blahs." It included quotes from the following MHS teachers: James Whitty (Accounting); "Marshfield's most demanding teacher" Jerry Kotsovas (Civics); "strict, highly respected" John Johnson (Math, Head Basketball Coach); Margaret Burdg (English, American Culture); and Noel Connall (History, American Culture). At the time, Marshfield had a student body of 1866, course offerings numbering 215 (including science fiction and film studies), and the dropout rate had reportedly fallen from 24% in 1966 to 13%.

The other two schools featured Medford High School in Medford, Massachusetts, a Boston suburb, West High School in Iowa City, Iowa.

== Academics ==
In 2008, 78% of the school's seniors received their high school diploma. Of 268 students, 210 graduated, 37 dropped out, 1 received a modified diploma, and 20 are still in high school. In 2009, enrollment fell under 1000 for the first time.

== Sports ==
- Football
- Basketball
- Volleyball
- Tennis
- Golf
- Bowling
- Track and field
- Wrestling
- Swimming
- Dance Team
- Cross Country
- Cheer Team
- Soccer

=== State championships ===
- Boys track & field: 2008, 2009, 2017, 2022
- Dance: 1990, 1995, 1996, 2001, 2004, 2006, 2013

Prior to 1990, the dance program competed in the 3A Division against both small and large schools. In 1989, the OSAA split the 3A league into large and small and Marshfield was placed in the small division, marking the first time in MHS history that it would not compete against the larger schools.

- Girls track & field: 1972, 2005, 2018
- Cheerleading: 1997, 2002
- Football: 1942, 1954, 1955, 1956, 1992, 2021
- Girls tennis: 1967
- Boys basketball: 1947, 1953
- Boys tennis: 1956, 1959 (doubles)
- Speech and debate: 2017
- Volleyball: 2024

== Activities ==
The Marshfield Times is a monthly student-published newspaper. The paper has consistently been ranked among the best student papers in America by the National Scholastic Press Association. The paper prints nine times per year. Originally named The Ma-Hi Times, the newspaper was renamed The Marshfield Times by editor-in-chief Moreen Littrell. It was produced on the school's own printing press for many years before moving to a paste-up layout model and a local printer in the 1980s. The newspaper converted to digital layout in fall 1991 using Aldus PageMaker software, two Macintosh Classic computers, a digital scanner for importing photos and clipart, and a 300-dpi monochrome laser printer (the laser printer's hard-copy output was pasted-up for final printing). The paper also reverted to The Ma-Hi Times name at time of the conversion to digital layout, using a scan of an original nameplate from the 1920s. The name switched back to The Marshfield Times in 2007 by editor Cody Hockema.

== Notable alumni ==
- Mel Counts - Olympic and NBA basketball player, seventh pick of 1964 NBA draft
- Bruce Anderson - former NFL defensive lineman
- Marv Harris - former NFL linebacker
- Elgen Long - pioneering aviator, received honorary diploma
- Steve Prefontaine - Olympic runner and former American record holder
- George Whitty - Grammy and Emmy Award winner
- Jeff Whitty - playwright, Tony Award winner, Avenue Q
- Mark Helfrich - former University of Oregon head football coach
