= KSHR-FM =

- Coquille, Oregon; United States
- Broadcast area: Coos Bay, Oregon
- Frequency: 97.3 MHz
- Branding: K-Shore

Programming
- Format: Country

Ownership
- Owner: Bicoastal Media; (Bicoastal Media Licenses III, LLC)
- Sister stations: KBBR, KBDN, KJMX, KOOS, KTEE, KWRO

History
- First air date: January 1, 1981 (as KWRO-FM at 102.3)
- Former call signs: KWRO-FM (1978–1982)
- Former frequencies: 102.3 MHz (1981–1984)
- Call sign meaning: K-Shore branding

Technical information
- Licensing authority: FCC
- Facility ID: 13872
- Class: C1
- ERP: 25,000 watts (horiz.); 5,900 watts (vert.)
- HAAT: 261 meters (856 ft)
- Transmitter coordinates: 43°14′51″N 124°06′46″W

Links
- Public license information: Public file; LMS
- Webcast: Listen Live

KSHR-FM (97.3 FM, "K-Shore") is a radio station licensed to serve Coquille, Oregon, United States. The station is owned by Bicoastal Media and the broadcast license is held by Bicoastal Media Licenses III, LLC.

KSHR-FM broadcasts a country music format to the Coos Bay, Oregon, area.

== History ==
This station, originally launched as a sister station to KWRO (630 AM), received its original construction permit from the Federal Communications Commission in 1978. The new station was assigned the KWRO-FM call sign by the FCC on September 29, 1978. After multiple extensions, KWRO-FM received its license to cover from the FCC on February 5, 1981.

In October 1981, KWRO Broadcasting Corporation reached an agreement to sell KWRO-FM to Southwest Broadcasters, Inc. The deal was approved by the FCC on January 5, 1982. The new owners had the FCC assign the station the KSHR-FM call sign on January 18, 1982.

After a series of financial issues, Southwest Broadcasters, Inc., reached an agreement in November 1986 to sell this station to Coquille River Broadcasters, Inc. The deal was approved by the FCC on March 27, 1987, and the transaction was consummated on April 1, 1987.

In the early 90's, KSHR-FM "K-Shore" switched from Adult Contemporary to Hot Country.

In April 2003, Coquille River Broadcasters, Inc., reached an agreement to sell this station to Bicoastal Media through their Bicoastal CB, LLC, subsidiary as part of a four-station deal valued at a reported $1.5 million. The deal was approved by the FCC on August 22, 2003, and the transaction was consummated on October 16, 2003. As part of an internal corporate reorganization, Bicoastal Media applied to the FCC in October 2007 to transfer the broadcast license for KSHR-FM and several sister stations from Bicoastal CB, LLC, to Bicoastal Media Licenses III, LLC. The transfer was approved by the FCC on October 29, 2007, and the transaction was consummated on the same day.
