= Dick Anderson (Oregon politician) =

American politician

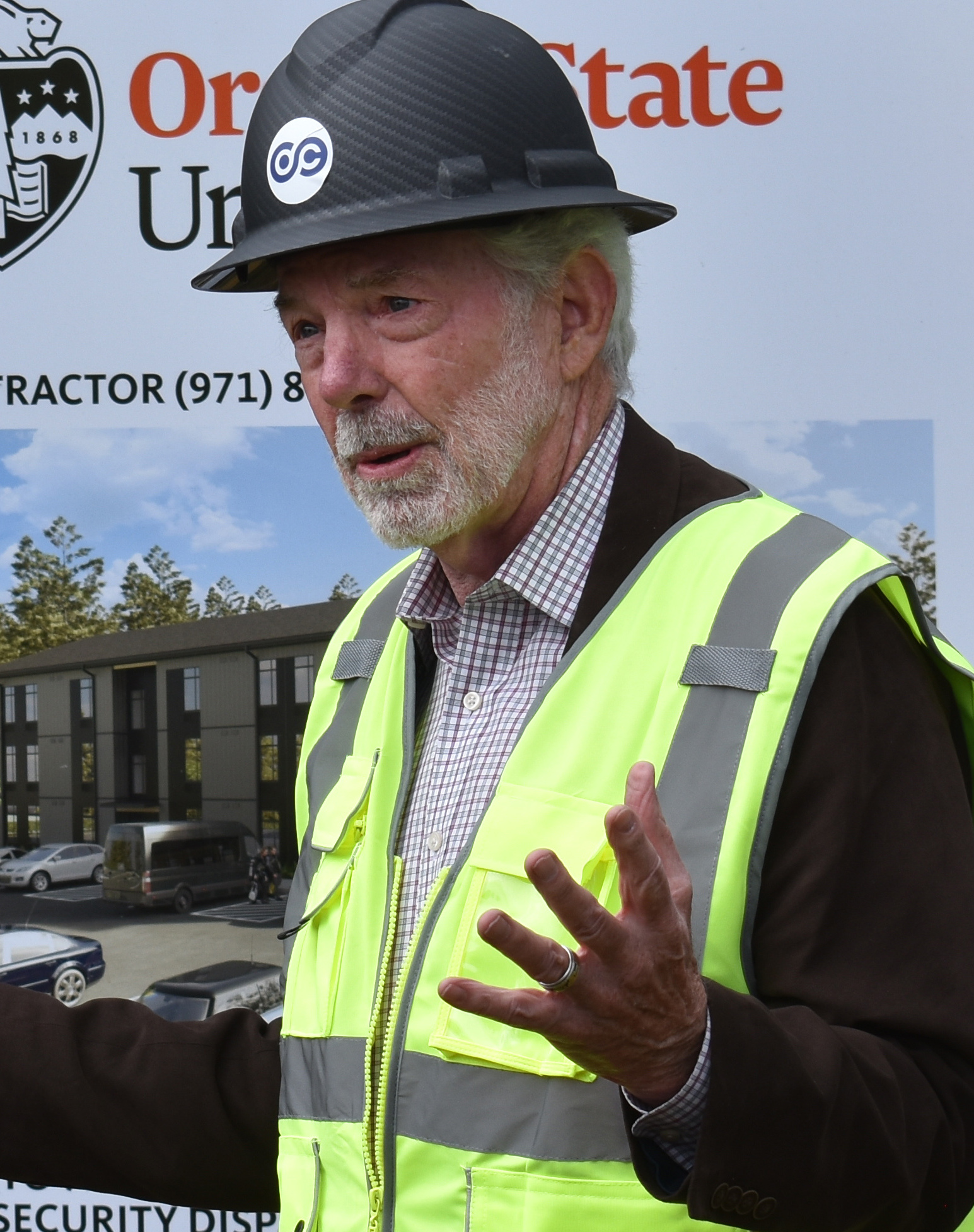

Member of the Oregon State Senate from the 5th district
- Incumbent
- Assumed office January 11, 2021
- Preceded by: Arnie Roblan

Personal details
- Born: June 9, 1950 (age 76)
- Party: Republican

Dick Anderson (born June 9, 1950) is an American politician and retired financial services executive who has served in the Oregon State Senate since 2021, representing the 5th district, which covers the central Oregon Coast, including all of Lincoln County and parts of Benton, Lane, Douglas, and Coos counties. A Republican, he previously served on the Lincoln City Council and as the city's mayor. He is the deputy leader of the Senate Republican caucus.

== Early life and career ==
Anderson was raised in Wallowa County, Oregon. He graduated from Pacific University in 1972, where he met his wife.

He worked in the financial services industry, including as a director at Fannie Mae and as a senior vice president at First Interstate Bank and Pacific First Mortgage Corporation, before retiring to Lincoln City.

Anderson served on the Lincoln City council from 2009 to 2010 and was elected mayor in 2010, serving from 2011 to 2014. He returned to council in 2015 and was elected mayor again in 2018, taking office in January 2019. He remained mayor until he joined the Oregon Senate in 2021.

== Oregon Senate ==
Anderson was the Republican nominee for the 5th district in 2016, losing narrowly to Democratic incumbent Arnie Roblan. After Roblan retired, Anderson won the open seat in 2020, defeating Democrat Melissa Cribbins and took office on January 11, 2021. He was re-elected in 2024 over Democrat Jo Beaudreau.

Anderson is a deputy leader of the Senate Republican caucus alongside Cedric Ross Hayden and David Brock Smith. He is vice chair of the Senate Committee on Housing and Development.

During the 2023 Republican Senate walkout, Anderson continued attending floor sessions, along with Brock Smith, and was not among the senators disqualified for reelection under Measure 113.

Anderson has focused on housing policy. In 2024, he was a floor carrier with Majority Leader Kayse Jama, of Senate Bill 1537, Governor Tina Kotek's housing production bill, which created the Housing Accountability and Production Office. In 2025, he and Jama were chief sponsors of Senate Bill 974, which sets deadlines for local governments to review housing land-use applications inside urban growth boundaries.

== Electoral history ==
2016 Oregon State Senator, 5th district
Party	Candidate	Votes	%
Democratic	Arnie Roblan	30,388	48.2
Republican	Dick Anderson	30,039	47.6
Libertarian	Dan Souza	2,568	4.1
Write-in		99	0.2
Total votes		63,094	100%

2020 Oregon State Senator, 5th district
Party	Candidate	Votes	%
Republican	Dick Anderson	37,807	49.4
Democratic	Melissa T Cribbins	35,620	46.5
Pacific Green	Shauleen Higgins	3,107	4.1
Write-in		72	0.1
Total votes		76,606	100%

2024 Oregon State Senator, 5th district
Party	Candidate	Votes	%
Republican	Dick Anderson	42,336	53.8
Democratic	Jo Beaudreau	36,281	46.1
Write-in		109	0.1
Total votes		78,726	100%
