= Coos Bay Public Schools =

Public school district in Oregon, U.S.

Coos Bay Public Schools (Coos Bay School District 9) is a public school district that serves the city of Coos Bay, Oregon, United States.

Communities in the district, entirely in Coos County, include Coos Bay, Barview, and Bunker Hill.

== Demographics ==
In the 2019-2020 school year, the district had 338 students classified as homeless by the Department of Education, or 10.35% of students in the district.

== Schools ==
Elementary schools (K-2)

- Eastside School
- Madison School

Intermediate schools (3-6)

- Millicoma School
- Sunset School

Secondary schools

- Marshfield Junior High School (grades 7-8)
- Marshfield High School (grades 9-12)

Harding Learning Center

- Alternative Instruction for Middle School (AIMS)
- Community Experience for Career Education (CE2)
- Destinations Academy
- Interim Program of Academic & Social Skills (IPASS)
- Resource Link Public Charter School (grades K-12)
- Teen Parent Program
