= KJMX =

- Reedsport, Oregon; United States
- Frequency: 99.5 MHz
- Branding: The Rock 99.5

Programming
- Format: Classic rock
- Affiliations: Westwood One

Ownership
- Owner: Bicoastal Media Licenses III, LLC
- Sister stations: KBBR, KBDN, KOOS, KSHR-FM, KTEE, KWRO

History
- First air date: 1993 (as KRBZ)
- Former call signs: KRBZ (1993–1999)

Technical information
- Licensing authority: FCC
- Facility ID: 20434
- Class: C3
- ERP: 11,000 watts
- HAAT: 122 meters (400 ft)
- Transmitter coordinates: 43°40′40″N 124°6′36″W

Links
- Public license information: Public file; LMS
- Webcast: Listen Live

KJMX (99.5 FM, "The Rock 99.5") is a radio station broadcasting a classic rock music format. Licensed to Reedsport, Oregon, United States, the station is currently owned by Bicoastal Media Licenses III, LLC, and features programming from Westwood One.

As KRBZ, the station was branded as "Crab Radio" with a satellite-fed hot adult contemporary format. Later in the 90's, the format was switched to 70's Classic Hits.

In 1999, the station returned to hot adult contemporary as "The Mix" KJMX.

After some time with a Classic Country format, KJMX traded formats with co-owned KBDN, and became Classic Rock.
