= Coos Bay, Oregon =

Coos Bay, Oregon Atsiixis (Coos)
- City
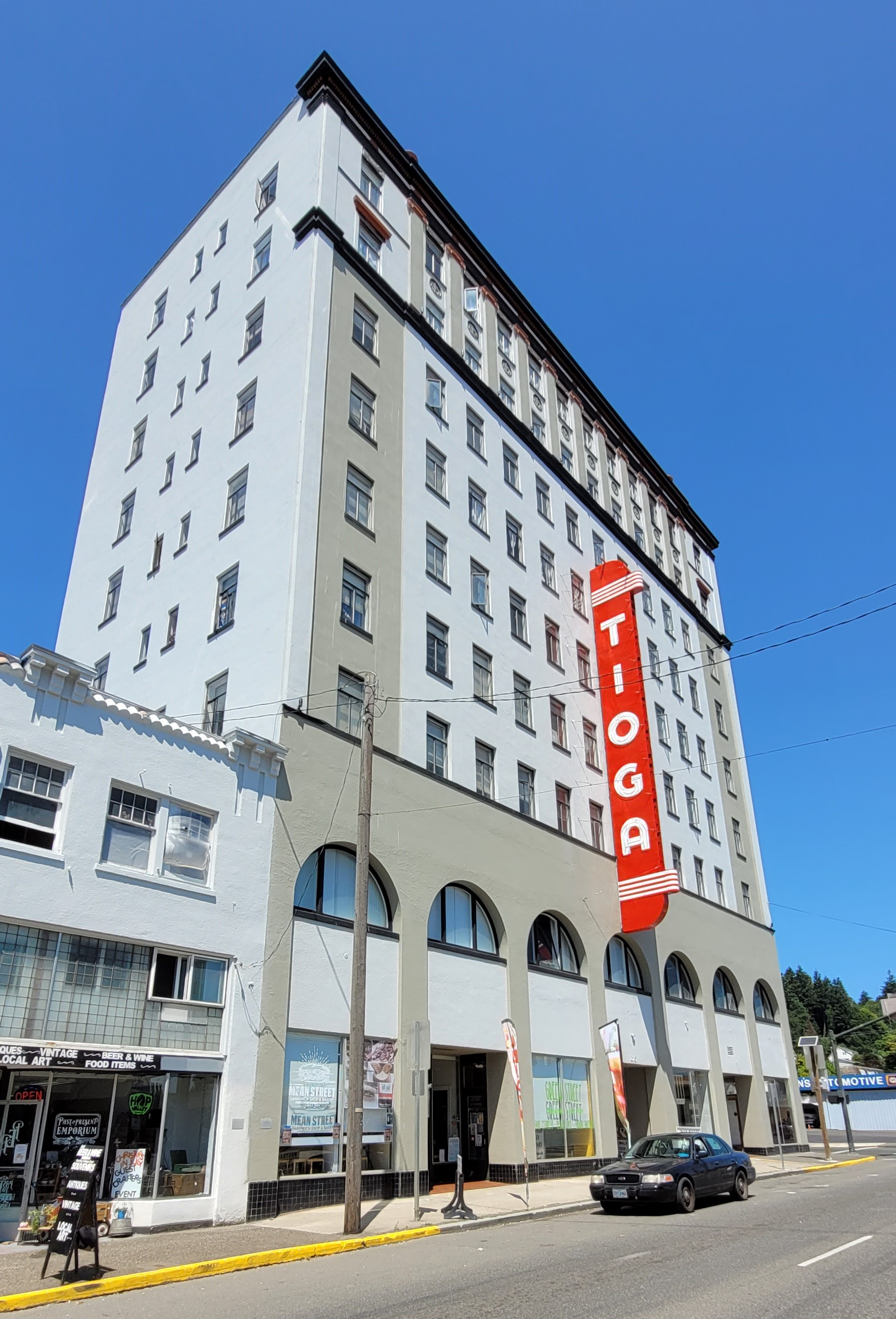
- The Tioga Building in July 2021
- Nickname: Oregon's Bay Area
- Location in Oregon
- Coordinates: 43°22′02″N 124°12′48″W
- Country: United States
- State: Oregon
- County: Coos
- Established: 1874
- Named for: Coos Bay

Government
  - Mayor: Joe Benetti

Area
  - City: 15.90 sq mi (41.19 km^{2})
  - Land: 10.63 sq mi (27.53 km^{2})
  - Water: 5.27 sq mi (13.66 km^{2})
  - Urban: 27.71 sq mi (71.8 km^{2})
  - Metro: 1,806.22 sq mi (4,678.1 km^{2})
- Elevation: 138 ft (42 m)

Population (2020)
  - City: 15,985
  - Density: 1,503.9/sq mi (580.67/km^{2})
  - Urban: 31,995
  - Metro: 64,620
- Time zone: UTC−8 (Pacific)
  - Summer (DST): UTC−7 (Pacific)
- ZIP code: 97420
- Area codes: 458 and 541
- FIPS code: 41-15250
- GNIS feature ID: 2410223
- Website: www.coosbayor.gov

Coos Bay (Coos: Atsiixis) is a city in Coos County, Oregon, United States, located where the Coos River enters the Coos Bay estuary on the Pacific Ocean. The city borders the adjacent municipality of North Bend; the two cities together form a contiguous urban core often referred to as Coos Bay–North Bend or "Oregon's Bay Area".

With a population of 15,985 at the 2020 census, Coos Bay is the most populous city on the Oregon Coast. The surrounding Coos Bay Census County Division (CCD) has an estimated total population of 32,308.

== History ==
Prior to Europeans first visiting the Oregon coast, Native American tribes claimed the Coos Bay region as their homeland for thousands of years. Members of the Coos, Lower Umpqua, Siuslaw and Coquille tribes lived, fished, hunted and gathered along Coos Bay and its estuaries, along rivers, and in meadows and forests. Approximately 400 years ago, British and Spanish explorers first approached the South Coast. In 1579, Sir Francis Drake was purported to have sought shelter for his ship, the Golden Hinde, around Cape Arago. Trader and explorer Jedediah Smith was in the region seeking furs, and the Hudson's Bay Company sent Alexander Roderick McLeod to search for an inland passage.

=== 19th century ===
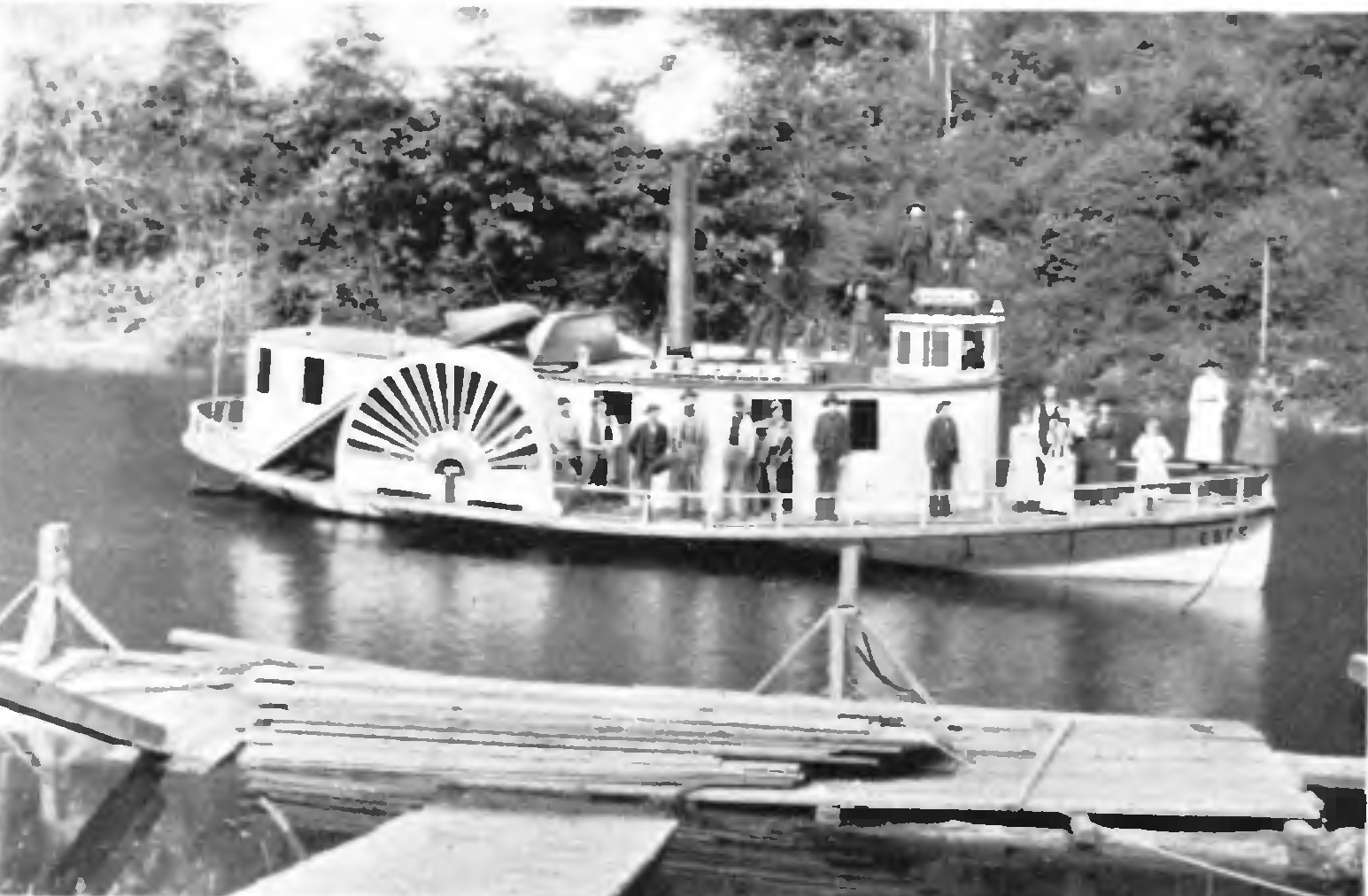
Steamboat Coos, sometime before 1895, probably in or near Coos Bay, Oregon

The earliest settlement of European Americans in the area was in January 1852 when survivors of the Captain Lincoln shipwreck established Camp Castaway until they and their cargo could be fully rescued. There has been a permanent settlement on Coos Bay since 1853, when the town of Marshfield was founded there and named after the Massachusetts hometown of its founder, J. C. Tolman. The first Methodist church in the area was established in 1857. By 1866 the inhabitants, who were reliant on the sea for their income, had built the Cape Arago Light. The setting up of a post office in 1871 and the arrival of the Coos Bay Wagon Road in the town a year later connected Coos County with the Umpqua River valley in neighboring Douglas County, on the other side of the Coast Range of mountains. This wagon road, although long gone in its original form, is still partially in existence since the route of Oregon Route 42 roughly follows the original right of way.

1870 saw Coos Bay set up its first, and the state's 48th, chartered Masonic Lodge. Named Blanco Lodge, this brotherhood was set up by several of the town's founding fathers. With this development, the incorporation of Marshfield came in 1874. One of the nation's oldest still-operating machine shops, the Nelson Machine Works-Coos Bay Iron Works, was founded in 1888.

=== 20th century ===
==== Alonzo Tucker ====
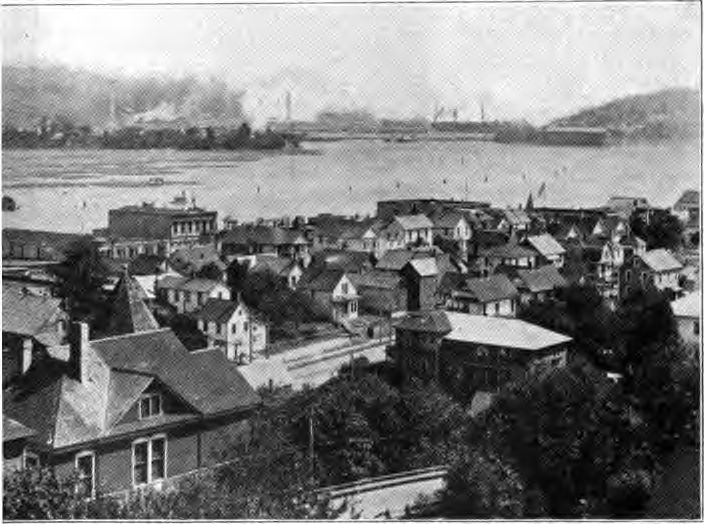
Marshfield from Wireless Hill circa 1920

On September 18, 1902, the only lynching ever to be documented in Oregon occurred in Coos Bay, of Alonzo Tucker, an African-American man. He was accused of raping a white woman and escaping from jail. However, there is no record of his escape from jail, though the question of the alleged rape is not as scrutinized. According to newspaper accounts, Tucker was discovered by two young boys who began shooting him with airguns. After a brief pursuit, local miners apprehended Tucker who was hiding inside a store. The mob considering hanging him inside the store but decided to return him to the site of the alleged rape at a nearby bridge. Tucker was shot twice and then hanged from the 7th Street bridge, which spanned present-day Golden Field, where high school soccer games are now held. No charges were ever brought against the mob, as officials determined "the deceased came to his death at the hands of parties unknown while resisting arrest for a felony, and that no crime was committed thereby." Despite this claim that those in the mob were unknown, the participation of multiple people, including the husband of the alleged rape victim, was noted in local newspapers. One newspaper at that time reported the mob was "quiet and orderly" and another paper wrote, "'Well done' is the consensus of public opinion." Alonzo Tucker's cause of death was asphyxiation. According to the coroner's report, cause of death was blood loss from the gunshot wound in Tucker's right thigh, in which case he died before being hanged on the Marshfield bridge.

===== Industry =====
Prior to around 1915, the Coos region was largely isolated from the rest of Oregon due to difficulties in crossing the Coast Range and fording rivers, and the Pacific Ocean was used to link people to other areas, including San Francisco, which was an easier two-day trip compared to traveling inland over rugged terrain. In 1916 a rail line was completed that linked the region to other interior settlements and towns, which increased commercial trade and tourism Significant urban growth occurred in the 1920s, and during the 1930s to 1950s large-scale growth occurred. Per the Oregon Bay Area Chamber of Commerce, during the 1930s to 1950s:

Shipyards contracted with the U.S. Government to build minesweepers and rescue tugs for World War II defense purposes. Large national lumber companies set up operations and expanded significantly for the next two decades. Jetty improvements, commercial fishing, and crabbing shaped the development of Charleston. The completion of the North Bend Bridge (now McCullough Memorial Bridge) in 1936 and the Roosevelt Highway significantly improved modern transportation connections and provided the final link in opening the Coos region to the outside world. The formerly remote district known as the Coos Bay country had come of age.

What now makes up the central district of Coos Bay was called Marshfield until November 10, 1944. The name change, long advocated by residents, had been voted for and became effective on November 11, thus matching the name of the Bay itself. The City of Marshfield was named after the Massachusetts hometown of the Cityʼs founder, J.C. Tolman, and incorporated in 1874.

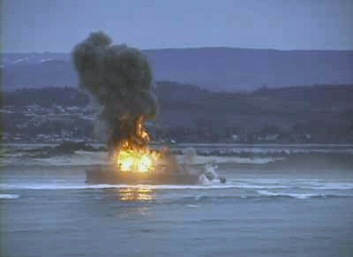
The New Carissa after catching fire

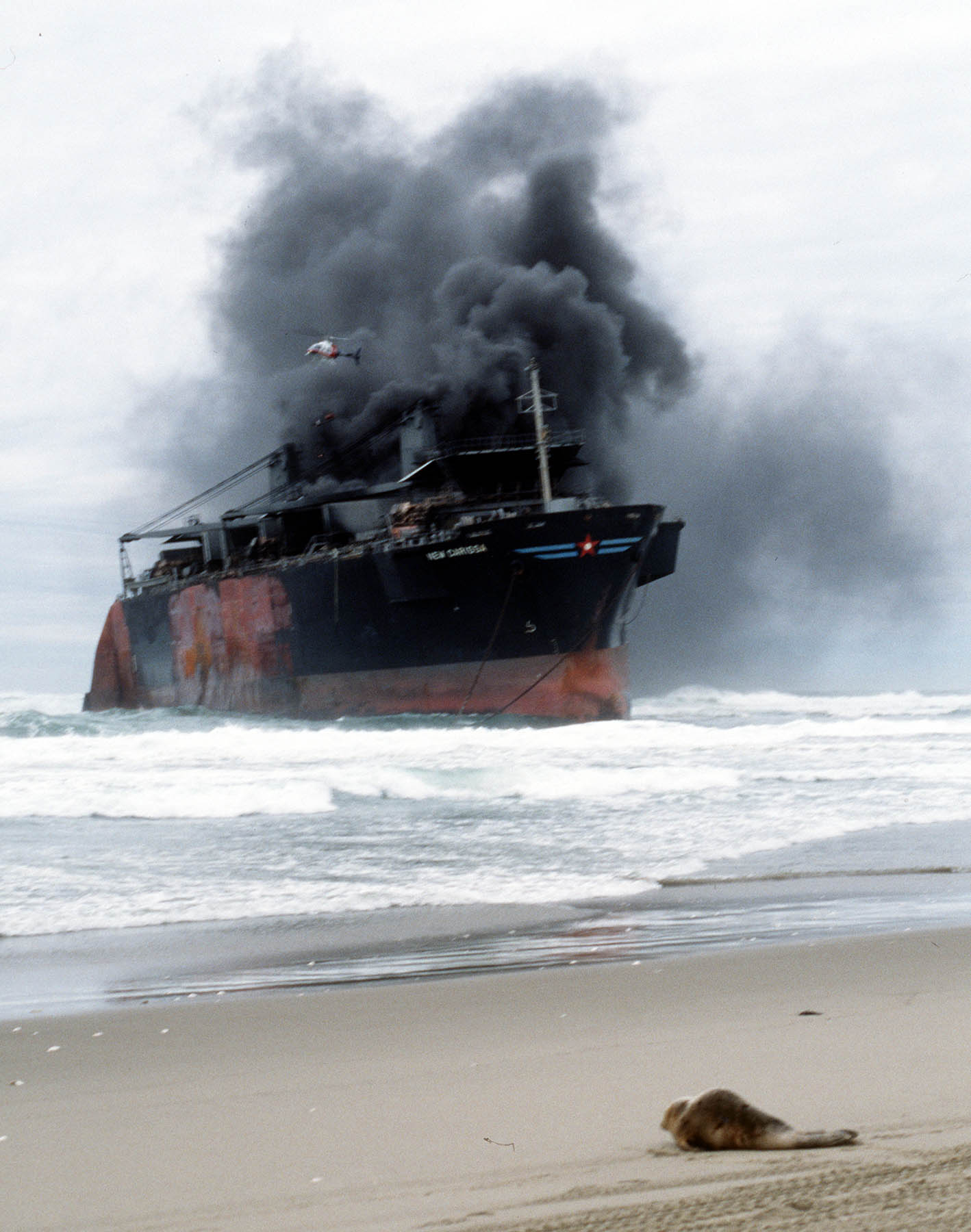
New Carissa burns, while a seal looks on

On February 4, 1999, a Japanese ship named the New Carissa ran aground on a beach 2.75 miles (4.3 km) north of the entrance to Coos Bay, drawing international attention to the area. The New Carissa was empty of cargo at the time, heading for the Port of Coos Bay to pick up wood chips. When the captain was told that the weather was too severe for the ship to enter port, he anchored his ship close by. The crew put out only one anchor, and it appears that this was probably on too short a chain to be effective. The subsequent US Coast Guard investigation found several other aspects of the ship's company's handling of the situation to have been poor, leading to the conclusion that human error caused the grounding. Seventy thousand US gallons (260 m^{3}) of #6 crude oil were spilled by the vessel, with a further 165,000 to 255,000 gallons (625 to 965 m^{3}) set alight via explosives and liquid napalm, by the Army Corps of Engineers, over the course of weeks. The explosives, the heat from the burning oil and the beating of the Pacific Ocean on the ship are what eventually caused the New Carissa to break in two.

The stern of the ship remained on the beach; the bow was towed out to sea and sunk after multiple attempts. They had to get special tow lines shipped in from overseas and had multiple tug boats pulling it out.

In 2008, the stern of the New Carissa was cut into pieces and removed from the beach.

==== Consolidation ====
Several votes to consolidate or merge cities around Coos Bay were held in the 20th century, beginning in 1906. In May 1962 and November 1962, voters in Coos County rejected propositions that would have merged the cities of Coos Bay, North Bend, Empire, and Eastside into a single city. The second vote had been defeated in North Bend by a margin of 98 votes, while the other four cities had approved. The consolidation had been proposed to provide an equal share of services across the Bay Area and retain more tax revenue from major employers in the county. Empire voted to merge with Coos Bay in December 1964 and was approved by the city council the following month. Eastside's merger was approved in November 1983 and took effect on December 29, 1983.

=== 21st century ===
The worst loss of life for a fire department in modern Oregon history occurred in Coos Bay on November 25, 2002, when three firefighters were killed by a structural failure of the roof in an auto parts store. The accidental blaze paralyzed the city for several hours, with fire departments from several neighboring towns assisting in the effort to stop the blaze. Captain Randy Carpenter, Firefighter/Engineer Robert "Chuck" Hanners and Firefighter/Engineer Jeff Common, all from Coos Bay, died when an explosion caused the roof of the building to cave in; they were inside the structure when the roof collapsed, killing the three firefighters.

== Geography ==
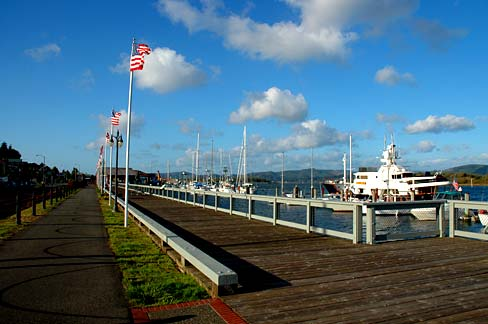
Coos Bay Waterfront

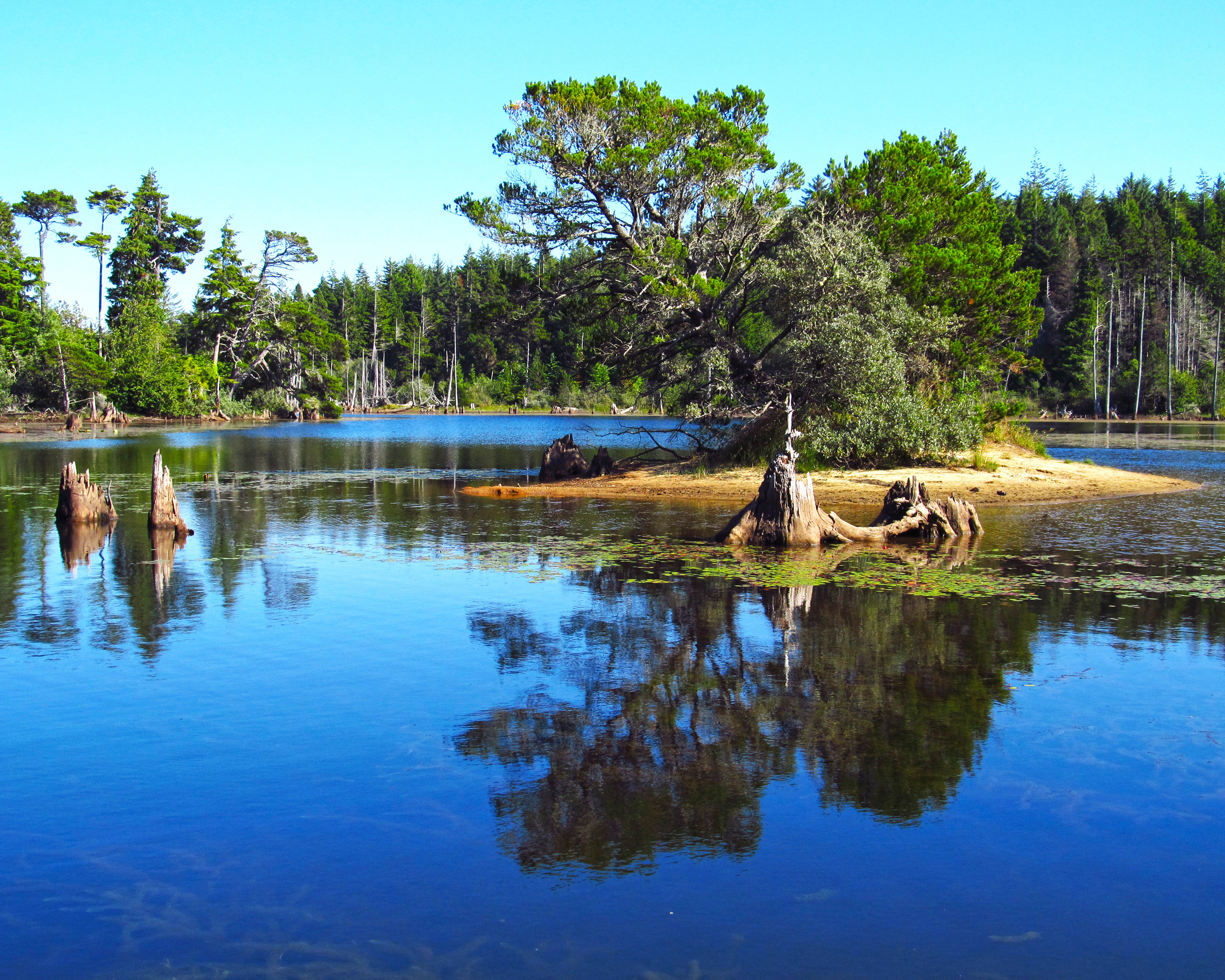
Empire Lakes is encompassed by John Topits Park in the northwestern section of Coos Bay.

According to the United States Census Bureau, the city has a total area of 15.90 square miles (41.18 km^{2}), of which, 10.60 square miles (27.45 km^{2}) is land and 5.30 square miles (13.73 km^{2}) is water. The city is quite hilly, with elevations ranging from between sea level to over 500 feet (150 m). Bodies of water within the city limits include Upper Pony Creek Reservoir, Lake Merritt, Empire Lakes and numerous streams.

=== Districts ===
The City of Coos Bay comprises four districts, two of which (Eastside and Empire) were formerly independent cities.

==== Marshfield ====
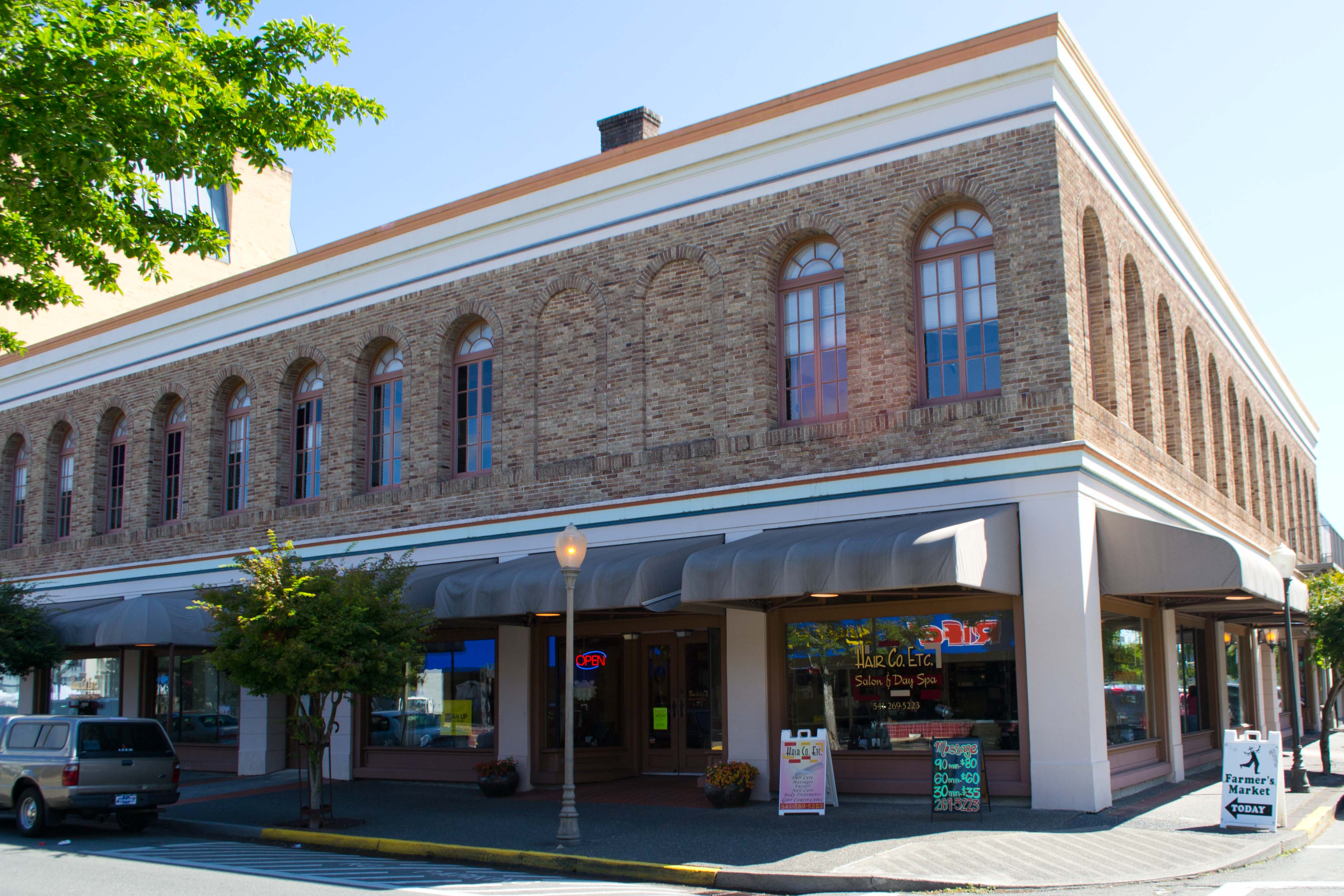
Historic architecture in the Marshfield District of Downtown Coos Bay

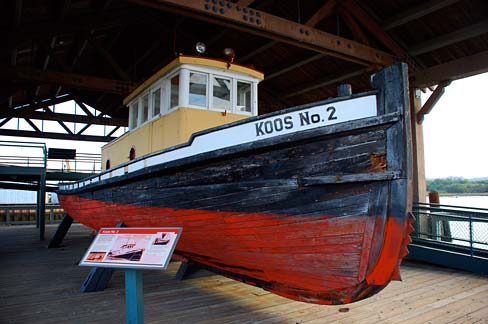
Maritime interpretive display at Coos Bay's boardwalk

The Marshfield District of Coos Bay is the historic central downtown and business district of the city. Old Marshfield and its surrounding neighborhoods were what comprised the original Coos Bay before the annexations of Empire and Eastside during the 20th century. The Marshfield District contains many buildings listed on the National Register of Historic Places, such as the Carnegie Library, Chandler Hotel, Egyptian Theatre and Tioga Hotel. The waterfront area of the Marshfield District has a boardwalk with a city dock, bicycling trail and pavilions featuring historical and interpretive displays.

==== Milner Crest ====
The Milner Crest district is a residential neighborhood developed in the mid-20th century, located at the crest of a hill overlooking the bay, north of Mingus Park and the Marshfield District. The majority of the Coos Bay area's medical facilities are located in this district.

==== Eastside ====
The Eastside district of Coos Bay was originally called East Marshfield for its situation on the east side of the bay. East Marshfield post office was established in 1891 and it operated intermittently until 1908, when the name was changed to Eastside. The community of Eastside merged with the city of Coos Bay in 1983. Eastside is primarily a residential neighborhood and is home to Eastside Elementary, Millicoma Middle School, walking trails at Millicoma Marsh and a public boat launch.

==== Empire ====
A trail established by Coquille people ran from the original site of Randolph to Empire.

The Empire district (Coos language: Hanisich)) was founded as Empire City in 1853 by members of the Coos Bay Company from Jacksonville, Oregon, and at the time it was assumed that the area would be center of the region. The company was formed after the discovery of gold in northern California and southwestern Oregon. For a time Empire City was the county seat of Coos County. The first post office in the location was called Elkhorn, which ran from 1853 until 1854. It was the first post office in what is now Coos County, though at the time it was part of Umpqua County. Empire City post office was established in 1858 and ran until 1894, when it was renamed Empire. In 1965, the city of Empire voted to consolidate with Coos Bay. Today, Empire is the location of Madison Elementary School, Sunset Intermediate School and a business district along Cape Arago Highway.

=== Climate ===
This region experiences cool-to-warm summers typical of the Oregon coast, with no average monthly temperatures above 71.6 °F (22.0 °C) which means mild weather usually in the lower 40s to upper 60s Fahrenheit. According to the Köppen Climate Classification system, Coos Bay has a warm-summer Mediterranean climate, abbreviated Csb on climate maps, but that borders on an oceanic climate, due to the cool year-round temperatures and sheer volume of annual rainfall, nearly 65 inches (1,651.0 mm) annually. Severe coastal storms (or gales) with hurricane-force winds occur frequently during the winter months, while summers can be foggy. Snowfall is uncommon, with just around an inch (2.54 cm) of snow annually. Air temperatures typically range from 40 °F (4 °C) to 75 °F (24 °C) all year.

The record high temperature of 102 °F (38.9 °C) was recorded on September 22, 2009, and the record low of 12 °F (−11.1 °C) was recorded on December 21, 1990. The wettest "rain year" at Southwest Oregon Regional Airport in nearby North Bend was from July 1994 to June 1995 with 89.13 inches (2,263.9 mm) and the driest from July 1976 to June 1977 with 30.87 inches (784.1 mm); the greatest monthly rainfall was 22.69 inches (576.3 mm) in November 1973, and the highest 24-hour rainfall 6.67 inches (169.4 mm) on November 18, 1996.

The Coos Bay—North Bend area is in USDA plant hardiness zone 9A, with a frost-free growing season around nine months long.

Climate data for Coos Bay, Oregon
Month	Jan	Feb	Mar	Apr	May	Jun	Jul	Aug	Sep	Oct	Nov	Dec	Year
Record high °F (°C)	73 (23)	82 (28)	88 (31)	91 (33)	95 (35)	100 (38)	99 (37)	97 (36)	102 (39)	99 (37)	79 (26)	70 (21)	102 (39)
Mean daily maximum °F (°C)	52.4 (11.3)	54.1 (12.3)	55.1 (12.8)	57.1 (13.9)	60.7 (15.9)	64.0 (17.8)	66.3 (19.1)	67.3 (19.6)	66.8 (19.3)	63.0 (17.2)	57.2 (14.0)	53.2 (11.8)	59.8 (15.4)
Mean daily minimum °F (°C)	39.2 (4.0)	40.2 (4.6)	41.0 (5.0)	42.8 (6.0)	46.7 (8.2)	50.4 (10.2)	52.4 (11.3)	52.6 (11.4)	50.3 (10.2)	46.8 (8.2)	43.0 (6.1)	40.5 (4.7)	45.5 (7.5)
Record low °F (°C)	16 (−9)	14 (−10)	23 (−5)	27 (−3)	27 (−3)	34 (1)	36 (2)	34 (1)	30 (−1)	27 (−3)	19 (−7)	12 (−11)	12 (−11)
Average precipitation inches (mm)	10.44 (265)	8.31 (211)	8.58 (218)	5.47 (139)	3.11 (79)	1.82 (46)	0.41 (10)	0.47 (12)	1.72 (44)	4.54 (115)	8.96 (228)	11.80 (300)	65.63 (1,667)
Average snowfall inches (cm)	0.6 (1.5)	0.2 (0.51)	0.1 (0.25)	0 (0)	0 (0)	0 (0)	0 (0)	0 (0)	0 (0)	0 (0)	0 (0)	0.1 (0.25)	1.0 (2.5)

Average sea temperature:
Jan	Feb	Mar	Apr	May	Jun	Jul	Aug	Sep	Oct	Nov	Dec	Year
50.9 °F (10.5 °C)	50.5 °F (10.3 °C)	50.7 °F (10.4 °C)	51.3 °F (10.7 °C)	52.9 °F (11.6 °C)	54.1 °F (12.3 °C)	54.3 °F (12.4 °C)	55.0 °F (12.8 °C)	55.4 °F (13.0 °C)	54.1 °F (12.3 °C)	53.6 °F (12.0 °C)	52.0 °F (11.1 °C)	52.9 °F (11.6 °C)

== Demographics ==
Historical population
Census	Pop.	Note	%±
1870	250		—
1880	642		156.8%
1890	1,461		127.6%
1900	1,391		−4.8%
1910	2,930		110.6%
1920	4,034		37.7%
1930	5,287		31.1%
1940	5,259		−0.5%
1950	6,223		18.3%
1960	7,084		13.8%
1970	13,466		90.1%
1980	14,424		7.1%
1990	15,076		4.5%
2000	15,374		2.0%
2010	15,967		3.9%
2020	15,985		0.1%

The term Oregon's Bay Area refers to the Greater Coos Bay-North Bend-Charleston Area; a 27.71 square mile community located on the Coos Bay Peninsula in Southwest Oregon. Oregon's Bay Area (also called the Coos Bay Micropolitan Statistical Area) has a total urban population of 31,995 (2017), and a MSA population of 64,709 (2012).

=== 2020 census ===
As of the 2020 census, Coos Bay had a population of 15,985. The median age was 43.5 years. 19.4% of residents were under the age of 18 and 23.6% of residents were 65 years of age or older. For every 100 females there were 94.4 males, and for every 100 females age 18 and over there were 93.6 males age 18 and over.

98.7% of residents lived in urban areas, while 1.3% lived in rural areas.

There were 6,895 households in Coos Bay, of which 24.1% had children under the age of 18 living in them. Of all households, 37.6% were married-couple households, 21.9% were households with a male householder and no spouse or partner present, and 30.7% were households with a female householder and no spouse or partner present. About 35.1% of all households were made up of individuals and 17.0% had someone living alone who was 65 years of age or older.

There were 7,611 housing units, of which 9.4% were vacant. Among occupied housing units, 57.1% were owner-occupied and 42.9% were renter-occupied. The homeowner vacancy rate was 1.9% and the rental vacancy rate was 5.3%.

Racial composition as of the 2020 census
Race	Number	Percent
White	13,219	82.7%
Black or African American	97	0.6%
American Indian and Alaska Native	350	2.2%
Asian	236	1.5%
Native Hawaiian and Other Pacific Islander	48	0.3%
Some other race	514	3.2%
Two or more races	1,521	9.5%
Hispanic or Latino (of any race)	1,431	9.0%

=== 2010 census ===
As of the census of 2010, there were 15,967 people, 6,950 households, and 3,991 families residing in the city. The population density was 1,451.9 inhabitants per square mile (560.6/km^{2}). There were 7,542 housing units at an average density of 669.9 per square mile (258.6/km^{2}). The racial makeup of the city was 87.1% White, 0.6% African American, 2.6% Native American, 1.4% Asian, 0.3% Pacific Islander, 2.8% from other races, and 5.2% from two or more races. 4.49% of the population were Hispanic or Latino of any race.

There were 6,950 households, of which 25.9% had children under the age of 18 living with them, 40.2% were married couples living together, 12.1% had a female householder with no husband present, and 42.6% were non-families. The percentage of male householders with no wife present was 5.1%. 33.6% of all households were made up of individuals, and 14.8% had someone living alone who was 65 years of age or older. The average household size was 2.27, and the average family size was 2.82.

In the city, the age distribution was 20.3% under the age of 18, 7.1% from 15 to 19, 19.2% from 25 to 44, 27.3% from 45 to 64, and 19.1% who were 65 years of age or older. The median age was 41.6 years. The median income for a household in the city was $37,985, and the median income for a family was $47,998. Males had a median income of $41,069 versus $26,648 for females. The per capita income for the city was $21,481. 18.1% of the population and 11.6% of families were below the poverty line. Out of the total population, 21.6% of those under the age of 18 and 7.9% of those 65 and older were living below the poverty line.

== Arts and culture ==
=== Museums and other attractions ===
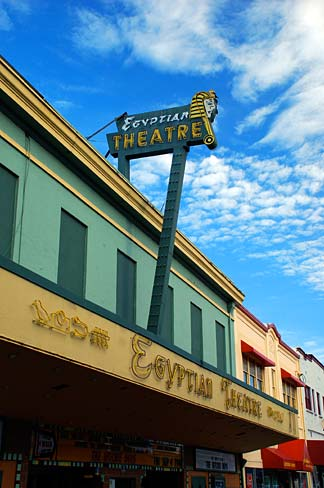
Egyptian Theater

- Coos Art Museum, a museum in Downtown Coos Bay, has operated since 1950. Located in a historic former US Post Office, it offers tour exhibits, art classes, lectures, and community events. The museum holds 477 permanent collections and rotates its displays throughout the year.
- Coos Historical & Maritime Center is an 11,000-square-foot (1,000 m^{2}) museum was built on a 3-acre (1.2 ha) site on Coos Bay's historic waterfront. The museum opened in Spring 2015.
- Coos Bay Iron Works, a producer of logging equipment, opened in 1882 and is still in business on Front Street, using a variety of antique tools dating to the Industrial Revolution.
- The Egyptian Theatre was part of a popular architectural movement and is the only Oregon movie house that still has its original theatre organ installation. Built in 1925, the theatre was closed in 2005, but it was reopened shortly after by a nonprofit agency. Closed again in 2011, the Egyptian Theatre Preservation Association and the Coos Bay Urban Renewal Agency were successful in raising enough money to reopen in June 2014.
- Oregon Coast Music Festival is an annual festival held the last two weeks of July, founded in 1978. Local, national and International artists perform diverse genres such as Native American, Celtic, Jazz, and Chamber as well as an 80 piece orchestra.
- Blackberry Arts Festival is an annual festival that began in 1982, held in August, that showcases local arts, crafts, food and entertainment in the historic Marshfield District.

== Parks and recreation ==
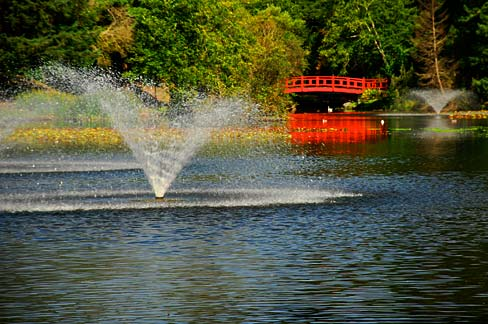
Mingus Park

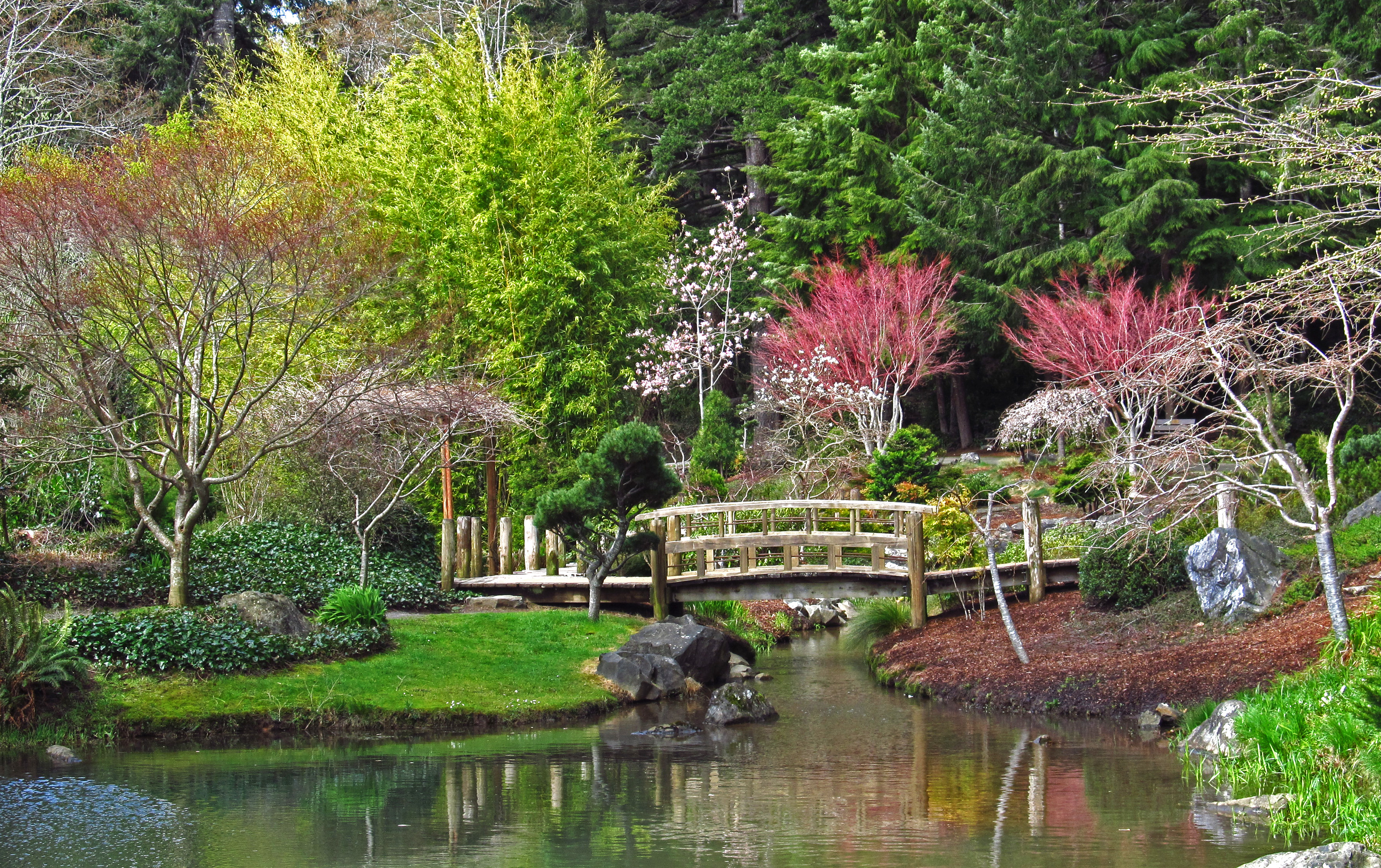
In Mingus Park

Mingus Park, near downtown Coos Bay, features a 1-mile (1.6 km) walking path that encircles a large pond with a resident population of ducks and geese. An outdoor swimming pool is available during the summer months, as well as an outdoor amphitheater. An 18-hole disc golf course is in the forest on the north side of the park. A skatepark and tennis courts are in the southeast portion. In addition, there is a playground for children in the southwest, and a softball field in the east.

John Topits Park, more commonly known as Empire Lakes, in the northwestern section of Coos Bay, is a 120-acre (49 ha) natural area encompassing the Empire Lakes and protected coastal dune and forest land. No motor boats are permitted on the lakes. However, there is a launch for canoes, kayaks and other non-motorized boats. There are 5.5 miles (8.9 km) of pedestrian and cycling trails. The Empire Lakes is home to a variety of fish (bass, bluegill, perch, catfish), waterfowl and birds.

The greater Coos Bay area has a variety of outdoor recreation opportunities, including the Oregon Dunes National Recreation Area, which brings approximately 1.5 million visitors each year. The ocean beaches near Coos Bay are devoid of the level of development seen on other areas of the Oregon Coast, due to much of the coastline being designated state and county parks. Across the entrance bar to Coos Bay from the Oregon Dunes National Recreation Area lie the rugged cliffs and pocket beaches of Bastendorff Beach County Park, Yoakam Point State Park, Sunset Bay State Park, Shore Acres State Park and Cape Arago State Park. Approximately 11 miles (18 km) southwest of Coos Bay is the South Slough National Estuarine Research Reserve and approximately 25 miles (40 km) east in the Coast Range is Golden and Silver Falls State Natural Area.

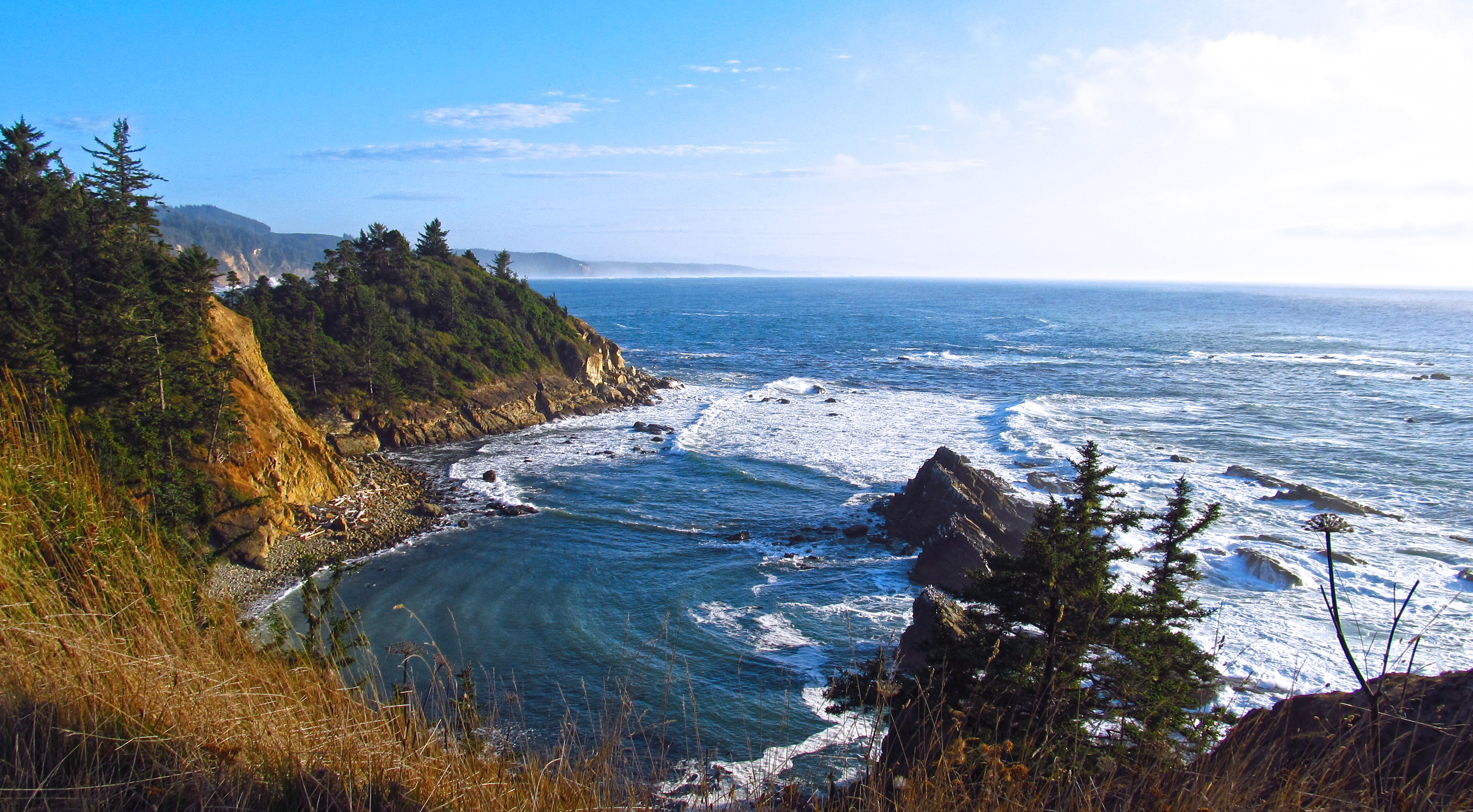
Cape Arago Overlook

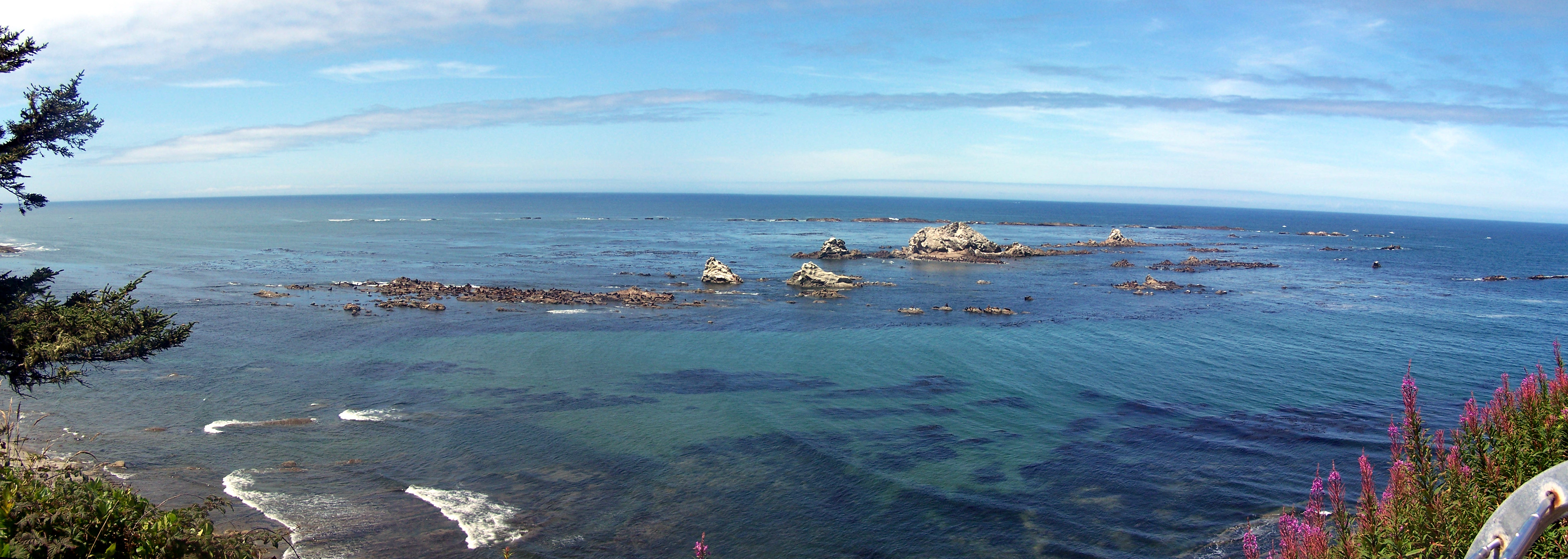
Simpson Reef Panorama

== Government ==
The City of Coos Bay operates under a council–manager form of government. The Coos Bay City Council is composed of a mayor and six councilors who are elected citywide to serve four-year terms. The council is responsible for setting policy decisions and they in turn hire a city manager to oversee the day-to-day administrative functions of the city. Coos Bay operates its own library, fire department, public works and police department. The fire department has two fire stations that are staffed 24 hours a day. There is a third station that is used to house additional apparatus.

The federally recognized Confederated Tribes of Coos, Lower Umpqua and Siuslaw Indians are headquartered in Coos Bay.

Coos Bay is represented in the United States House by Val Hoyle (D-Eugene) and in the Oregon Legislature by State Senator Dick Anderson (R-Lincoln City) and State Representative Boomer Wright (R-Florence).

== Education ==
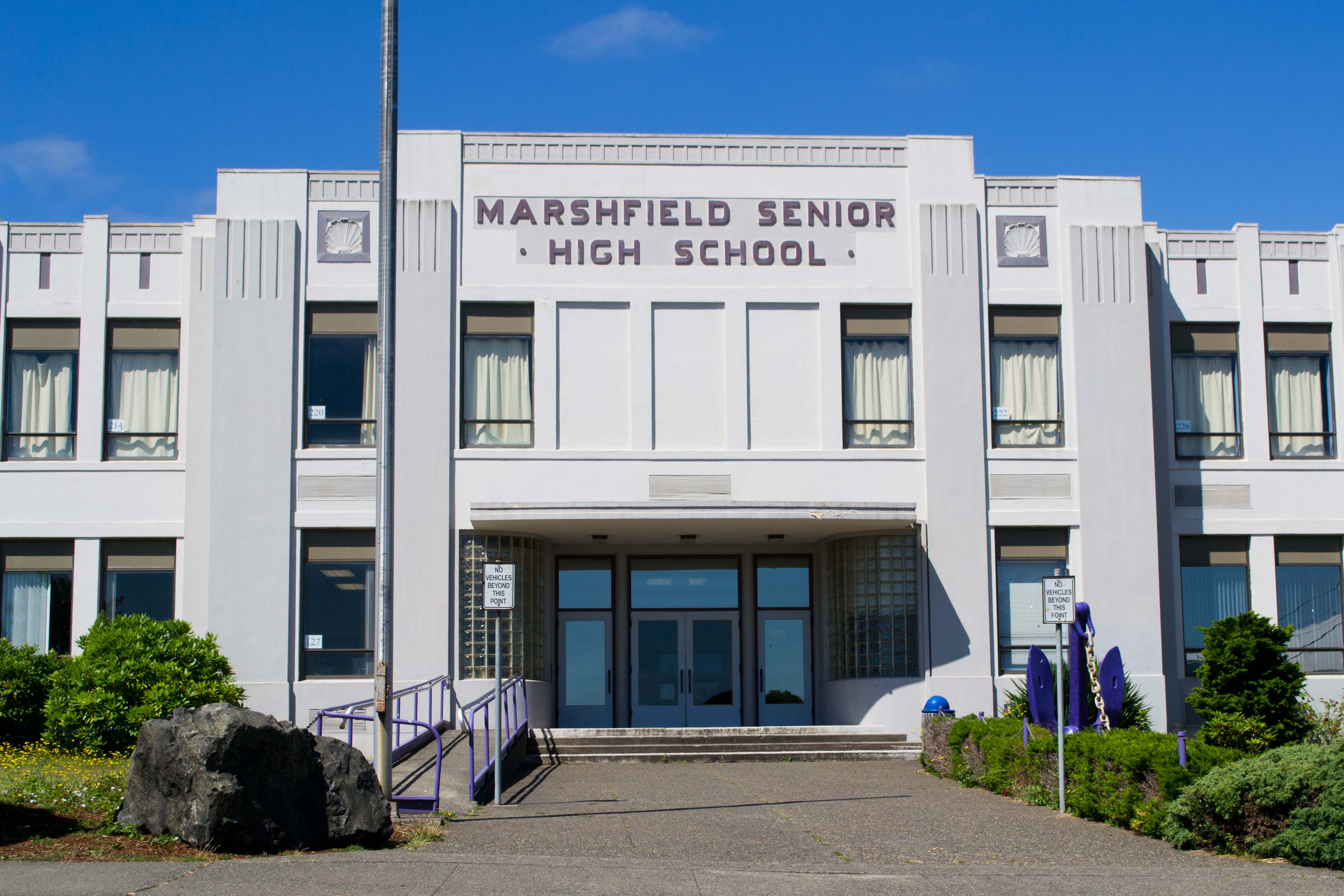
Marshfield High School

=== Public education ===
Coos Bay K–12 public education is served by the Coos Bay School District.

=== Higher education ===
Southwestern Oregon Community College (or SWOCC) offers certificates and associate degrees, and has a dual admissions programs in partnership with Oregon public universities.

Oregon Institute of Marine Biology (or OIMB) is the marine station of the University of Oregon. It is in Charleston, at the mouth of Coos Bay. This 100-acre (0.40 km2) marine station was first deeded to the University of Oregon in 1931.

== Health care ==
Coos Bay has the largest concentration of health care facilities on the Oregon Coast and serves as a regional hub for the Central and Southern Coasts, as well as inland areas. Bay Area Hospital, the largest hospital on the coast has 129 beds. Other facilities in the city include North Bend Medical Center, Oregon Coast Spine Institute, Bay Clinic, South Coast Center for Cosmetic Surgery, South Coast Orthopedic Associates and Southwest Physical Therapy.

== Renewable energy ==
In 2012, Ocean Power Technologies proposed a commercial wave park in North America at Coos Bay. The planned size of this park was up to 100 megawatts, and if built it would have been the largest wave energy project in the world. Ocean Power Technologies surrendered the project's permit in 2014, citing high costs and "a difficult regulatory process".

== Transportation ==
Coos Bay is located along U.S. Highway 101.

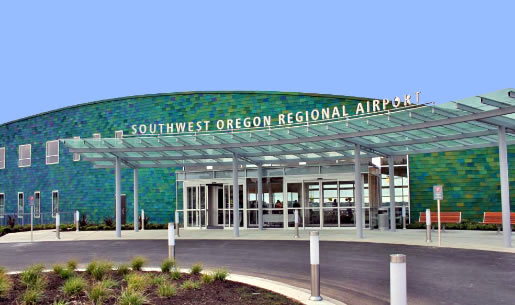
Southwest Oregon Regional Airport

=== Air ===
The Southwest Oregon Regional Airport (ICAO: KOTH, IATA: OTH) is a public airport located in adjacent North Bend and is the 5th busiest airport in Oregon, as well as the largest airport on the Oregon Coast. Currently (2014) the airport hosts general aviation and charter services, as well as offering daily commercial flights to/from San Francisco and seasonal flights to Denver International Airport in Colorado.

=== Intercity bus ===
Porter Stage Lines provides bus service from Coos Bay with several stops, including Eugene, which has connections with Amtrak rail services and the Greyhound bus network. Porter Stage Lines then extends to Bend and ends at Ontario in eastern Oregon, and then reverses the trip.

=== Intracity bus ===
Coos Transit, also known as CCAT provides daily loop service to 54 stops around Coos Bay and North Bend.

=== Port and rail ===
The Port of Coos Bay provides freight shipping services. The Central Oregon and Pacific Railroad operated the Coos Bay Rail Link linking the port to the national rail network. The line is now operated by Coos Bay Rail Link.

== Media ==
=== Radio ===
- KSBA 88.5 FM (public)
- KSOR 89.1 FM (public, translator)
- KJCH 90.9 FM (Christian)
- KMHS-FM 91.3 (high school)
- K219CK 91.7 (translator for KEAR-FM)
- KDCQ 92.9 FM (commercial)
- KTEE 94.9 FM (commercial)
- KTEE 95.7 FM (translator)
- KSHR-FM 97.3 FM (commercial)
- KYTT 98.7 FM (Christian)
- KJMX 99.5 FM (commercial)
- KJMX 100.3 FM (translator)
- K286CR 105.1 FM (translator for KMHS-AM)
- KLJN 105.9 FM (commercial)
- KOOS 107.3 FM (commercial)
- KOOS 107.7 FM (translator)
- KWRO 630 AM (commercial)
- KGRV 700 AM (Christian)
- KDUN 1030 AM (commercial)
- KHSN 1230 AM (commercial)
- KBBR 1340 AM (commercial)
- KMHS 1420 AM (high school)

=== Television ===
- KCBY channel 11 (CBS)
- KMTR channel 23 (NBC, with The CW Plus on DT2)

=== Newspaper ===
- The World

== Notable people ==
- Sheila Bleck, IFBB professional bodybuilder
- Mel Counts, professional basketball player, 1964 Olympic gold medalist, seventh pick of 1964 NBA draft
- Claire Falkenstein, sculptor renowned for large-scale abstract metal and glass public sculptures
- Rich Fellers (born 1959), Olympic equestrian
- Larry Haun, carpenter and author
- Buddy Hayes, musician and member of the Lawrence Welk orchestra
- Mark Helfrich, University of Oregon football head coach from 2013 to 2016
- Aaron M. Johnson, jazz saxophonist and bandleader
- Adelaide Hanscom Leeson, early 20th-century artist and photographer
- Armin D. Lehmann, survivor of the last days of Nazi Germany in Hitler's bunker
- Michael McGriff, Award-winning American poet, Lannan Literary Fellowship recipient
- Steve Neal, historian and journalist
- Steve Prefontaine, Olympic distance runner; born in Coos Bay and attended Marshfield High School
- Gerald Strebendt, mixed martial artist, former UFC fighter
- George Whitty, three-time Grammy Award-winning musician, brother of playwright Jeff Whitty
- Jeff Whitty, Tony Award-winning playwright

== Sister city ==
Coos Bay has one sister city:

- Chōshi, Chiba Prefecture, Japan

== See also ==
- Steamboats of Coos Bay
- Steamboats of the Oregon Coast
