= Coquille Myrtle Grove State Natural Site =

State park in Oregon, U.S.

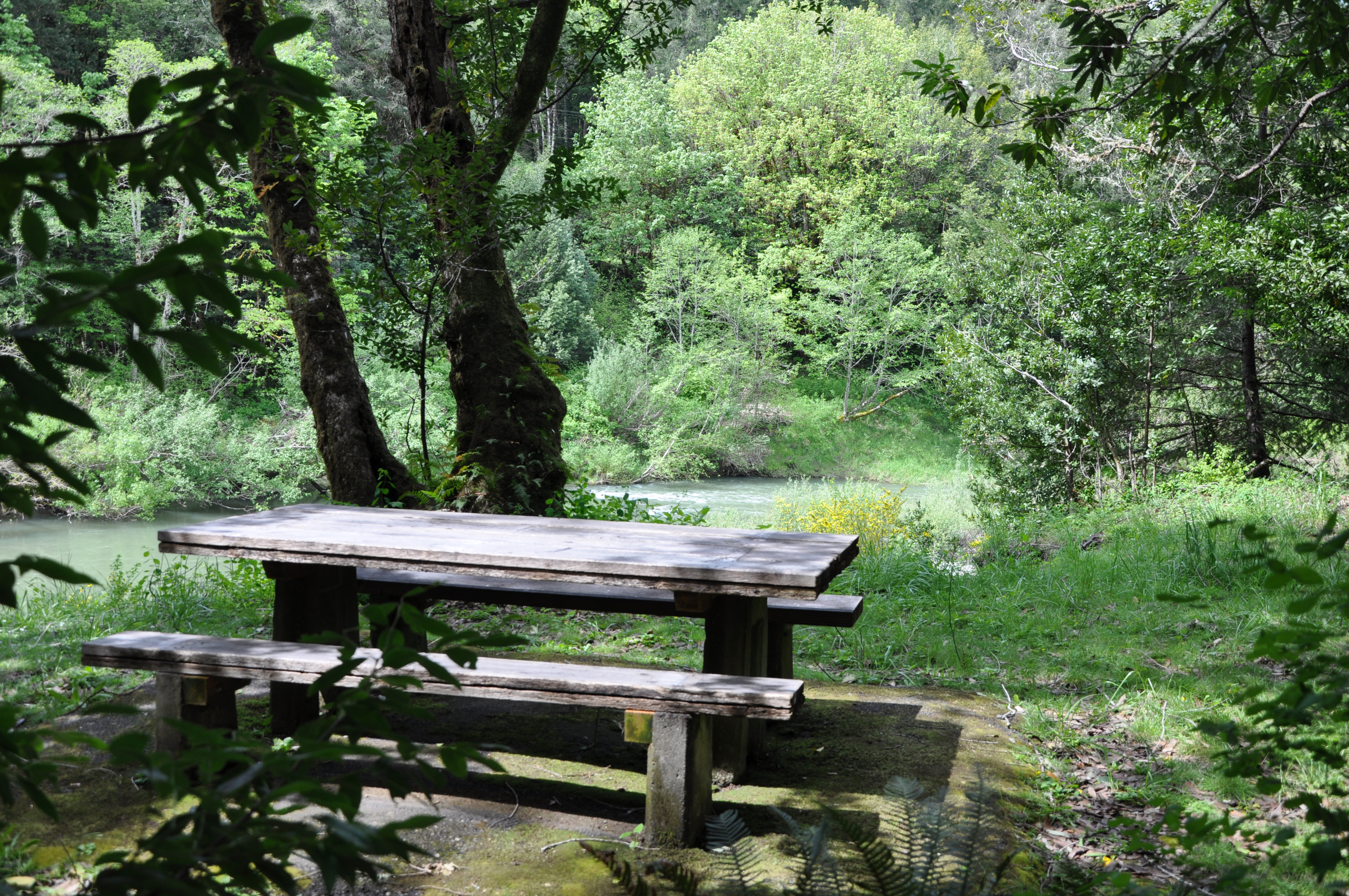
- Picnic table at the site along the South Fork Coquille River

- Location within Oregon Location within the United States
- Interactive map of Coquille Myrtle Grove State Natural Site
- Type: Public, state
- Location: Coos County, Oregon
- Nearest city: Myrtle Point
- Coordinates: 42°57′44″N 124°06′24″W
- Area: 7 acres (2.8 ha)
- Created: 1950
- Operator: Oregon Parks and Recreation Department
- Open: Day-use, year-round

Coquille Myrtle Grove State Natural Site is a state park administered by the Oregon Parks and Recreation Department in the U.S. state of Oregon. The park, bordering the Powers Highway (Oregon Route 542) between Myrtle Point and Powers, in Coos County, features a swimming hole and sandy beach along the South Fork Coquille River. Other amenities include parking, picnic tables, restrooms, and access to fishing.

The Save the Myrtlewoods organization donated the land for the park in 1950. Subject to occasional flooding, the 7-acre (2.8 ha) park contains a stand of Oregon myrtle trees. The Oregon myrtle, also known as California laurel or Pacific myrtle, is a slow-growing hardwood often turned into lumber to make furniture, cabinets, and specialty items such as plates and bowls. Many of the larger stands, found at low elevation along the Pacific coast between lower California and Coos Bay, have been cut.

== See also ==
- List of Oregon state parks
- Coquille River Falls
