= Central Oregon and Pacific Railroad =

Railroad operating between California and Oregon

Central Oregon & Pacific Railroad

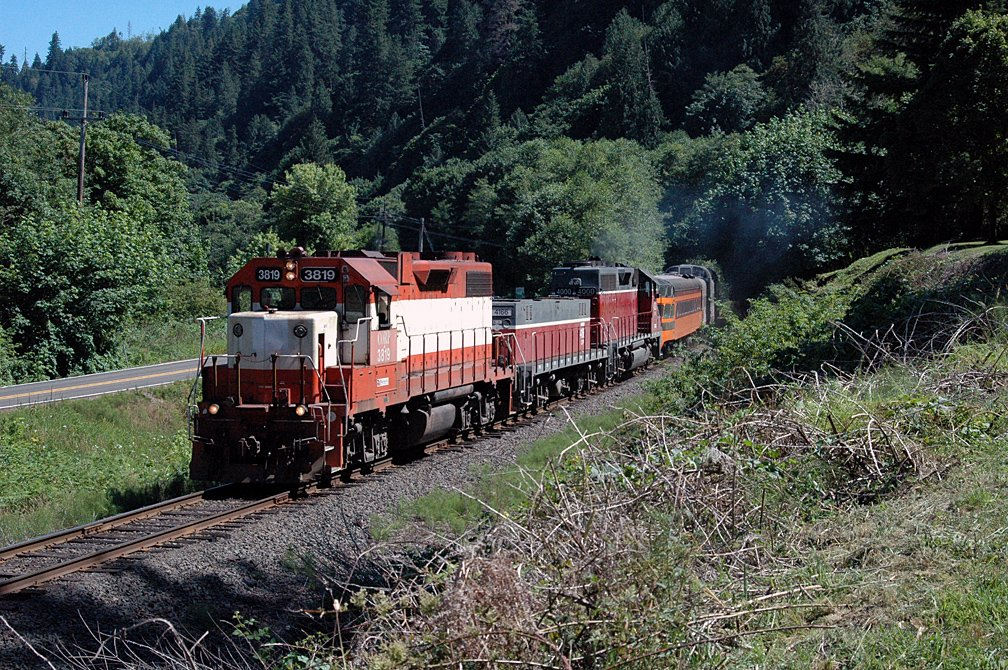
- An EMD GP38-2 leads an NRHS excursion over the Coos Bay Line in 2005.

Overview
- Headquarters: Roseburg, Oregon
- Reporting mark: CORP
- Locale: Weed, CA - Eugene, OR
- Dates of operation: 1995–present

Technical
- Track gauge: 4 ft 8 1/2 in (1,435 mm)
- Length: 306 miles (492 km)

Other
- Website: www.gwrr.com/corp/

The Central Oregon & Pacific Railroad (reporting mark CORP) is a Class II railroad operating between Northern California and Eugene, Oregon, United States. It was previously a mainline owned by the Southern Pacific Railroad (SP) between Eugene and Weed, California (north of Redding, California) via Medford, Oregon. SP sold the route on December 31, 1994, in favor of using its route to Eugene via Klamath Falls, Oregon and Cascade Summit.

The mainline of the CORP is 305 miles (491 km). Traffic is estimated at 17,000 cars per year, consisting mainly of logs, lumber products, and plywood. CORP is a subsidiary of Genesee & Wyoming, which acquired the railroad as part of its acquisition with RailAmerica in late 2012. Until 2007, CORP also operated the 136-mile (219 km) Coos Bay branch, another line once owned by the SP.

On May 17, 2007, CORP was awarded a Silver E. H. Harriman Award in Group C for the railroad's safety record in 2006. This award marked the first time a RailAmerica-owned railroad has earned a Harriman award.

== Genesee & Wyoming ==
As of 2025, CORP holds 306 miles (492 km)—58 in California and 248 in Oregon Interchanges are with the Yreka Western Railroad (YW) (Montague, California); Rogue Valley Terminal Railroad Corporation (RVT) (White City, Oregon); and the Union Pacific Railroad Company (UP) (Eugene, Oregon and Black Butte, California).

== Siskiyou Pass ==
In December 2007, CORP announced it was cutting shipments over the Siskiyou Pass south of Ashland, Oregon beginning January 15, 2008. Shipments from Ashland and areas north of Ashland would be re-routed north to Eugene before heading south via Klamath Falls. Reduced shipments would continue over the Siskiyou Pass until April 15, 2008, on a bi-weekly basis. On December 31, 2025, Roseburg forest products in Weed, California said it was closing its California location for this reason. CORP closed down the Siskyou line between Medford and Black Butte, California.

On March 20 2008, CORP announced plans to keep its Siskiyou line open between Medford and Weed, and to spend nearly $5 million on improvements to the line.

CORP reopened the 95-mile (153 km) section between Ashland and Weed in November 2015, after repairing rails, ties, and bridges. The project was funded by $7.1 million of Transportation Investment Generating Economic Recovery (TIGER) money, $30,000 combined from Douglas and Jackson counties, and a 25 percent match from CORP.

== Coos Bay Line ==
The Coos Bay Line began in 1893 as the 26-mile (42 km) Coos Bay, Roseburg & Eastern Railroad and Navigation Company (CBR&E) bringing logs and lumber from coastal forests to the seaport town of Marshfield (later renamed Coos Bay.) Southern Pacific Railroad purchased the CBR&E in 1906 and spent ten years building west from Eugene on its Willamette River valley line to a connection with the former CBR&E at Reedsport to open this Coos Bay branch for traffic in August 1916. The completed 139 mi (224 km) branch line went from Eugene to Powers via the communities of Veneta, Noti, Swisshome, Mapleton, Cushman, Canary, Reedsport, Lakeside, Hauser, North Bend, Coos Bay, Coquille and Myrtle Point. The branch climbs out of Eugene along Long Tom River and Noti Creek before cresting the coast range in tunnel 13 to follow Wildcat Creek and the Siuslaw River downstream to the Pacific coast. The branch crosses the Siuslaw River six times. The last crossing is a drawbridge at Cushman where the branch heads south parallel to the coast using tunnels to cross from one river valley to the next. Tunnel 19, with a length of 4,183 ft (1,275 m) was Southern Pacific's longest tunnel in the state of Oregon. Impressive drawbridges cross the Umpqua River at Reedsport and the mouth of Coos Bay. According to a timetable dating 1920, four through-passenger trains and a local between North Bend and Myrtle Point made up passenger service in the line. Passenger service ended on June 4, 1953, after many years of only one running passenger train, nicknamed "The Owl". The line continued to serve a number of sawmills harvesting Oregon's coastal forests. Until the late 20th century the branch carried 14,000 carloads per year of outbound lumber, plywood, woodchips, fiberboard, and paper with inbound LP gas and chemicals for the forest products mills. Tracks beyond the Georgia-Pacific mill at Coquille were abandoned and subsequently removed in the 1980s. "In 1994 SP sold the route to Railtex (later, RailAmerica), which operated it as part of" CORP.

On September 21, 2007, CORP elected to shut down most of the Coos Bay branch. The track was closed between Vaughn (west of Noti) and Coquille (south of Coos Bay). This action was taken after it was revealed that the nine aging tunnels on the line required repairs that were internally estimated to cost up to $7 million.

On October 23, 2007, the Port of Coos Bay filed a $15 million lawsuit against CORP, in response to its closing of the Coos Bay Branch. The suit claims that CORP failed to provide the required 180 days' notice that it would shut down a leased spur to the bay's North Spit.

On November 21, 2008, the Surface Transportation Board ordered CORP to sell part of the branch to the Port of Coos Bay for $16.6 million. The 111-mile (179 km) segment links Danebo and Cordes. The price was much less than RailAmerica, CORP's corporate parent, had desired ($25 million), and much closer to what the port had initially offered ($15 million). The Port completed the purchase of the line in 2009 and by 2010 was repairing the tunnels that led to the line's closure. The Port reopened the line in 2011 as Coos Bay Rail Link.
