= Gaylord, Oregon =

Unincorporated community in the state of Oregon, United States

- Unincorporated community
- Location within the state of Oregon Gaylord (the United States)
- Coordinates: 42°57′19″N 124°06′24″W
- Country: United States
- State: Oregon
- County: Coos
- Elevation: 85 ft (26 m)
- Time zone: UTC-8 (Pacific (PST))
  - Summer (DST): UTC-7 (PDT)
- GNIS feature ID: 1142595

Gaylord is an unincorporated community in Coos County, Oregon, United States. It is about 12 miles (19 km) south of Myrtle Point on Oregon Route 542, near the South Fork Coquille River.

A station named Gaylord Siding was established on the Coos Bay Line of the Southern Pacific Railroad in 1916. A post office named Gaylord was established nearby in 1927; it closed in 1958. The source of the name is unknown.

Author Ralph Friedman says of Gaylord that it is "Nothing but a name".
