= Broadbent, Oregon =

Unincorporated community in the state of Oregon, United States

- Unincorporated community
- Location within Oregon Location within the United States
- Coordinates: 43°00′32″N 124°08′47″W
- Country: United States
- State: Oregon
- County: Coos
- Elevation: 79 ft (24 m)
- Time zone: UTC-8 (Pacific (PST))
  - Summer (DST): UTC-7 (PDT)
- ZIP code: 97414
- Area code: 541
- GNIS feature ID: 1118090
- Coordinates and elevation from Geographic Names Information System

Broadbent is an unincorporated community in Coos County, Oregon, United States. Broadbent is on Oregon Route 542 south of Myrtle Point along the South Fork Coquille River. Broadbent has a post office with ZIP code 97414.

The community was named after C.E. Broadbent, who started a cheese factory in what would become Broadbent. The Coos Bay Line of the Southern Pacific Railway opened a station at Broadbent in 1915. The local post office opened on August 19, 1916.

== Climate ==
This region experiences warm (but not hot) and dry summers, with no average monthly temperatures above 71.6 °F (22.0 °C). According to the Köppen Climate Classification system, Broadbent has a warm-summer Mediterranean climate, abbreviated "Csb" on climate maps.
