= Vaughn, Oregon =

Human settlement in Oregon, United States

Coordinates: 44°01′25″N 123°26′13″W

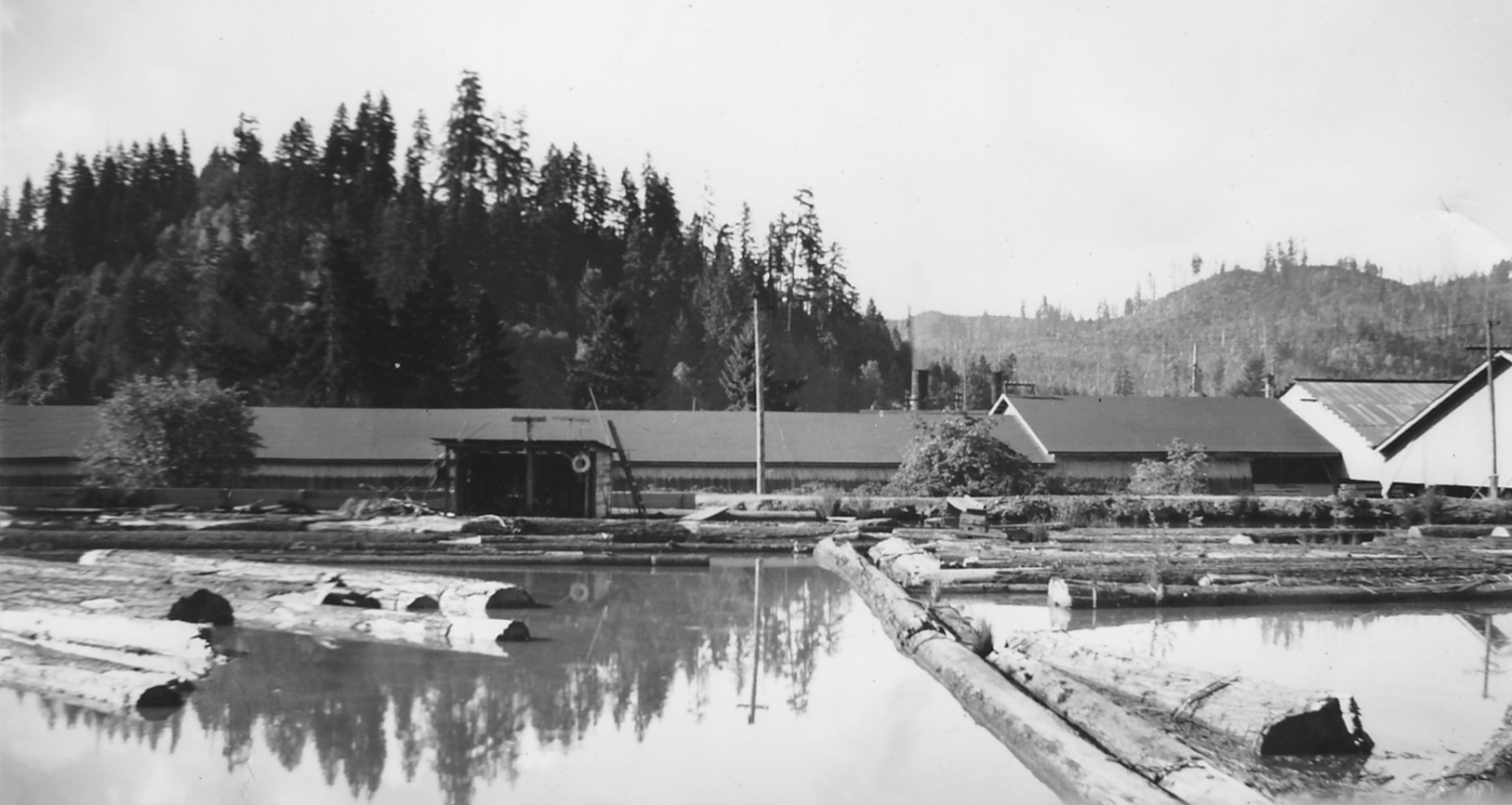
Sawmill and mill pond of the Long-Bell Lumber Company in Vaughn, Oregon, in August 1947.

Vaughn is an unincorporated community in Lane County, Oregon, United States. It is located about 4 miles (6.4 km) south of Noti in the foothills of the Central Oregon Coast Range near Noti Creek. Author Ralph Friedman described Vaughn as "a mill in the meadows".

== History ==
Vaughn was established in the 1920s by the Snellstrom Brothers Lumber Company. The company town was later owned by the Long-Bell Lumber Company, then sold to International Paper (IP) in the mid-1950s. Vaughn is near the route of Coos Bay Rail Link (formerly the Central Oregon and Pacific Railroad Coos Bay Line, once a branch of the Southern Pacific Railroad). On a 1930 map the community is shown on the property of Roland Vaughn. Because the railroad makes a horseshoe bend and misses the community, the railroad's Vaughn Station is about a mile west of there.

Today Vaughn is the site of a Rosboro Lumber Company laminated beam plant that was purchased from Weyerhaeuser in 2005. The beam plant was built by Bohemia, Inc. in 1988. Bohemia also ran a plywood plant at Vaughn, which it had purchased from International Paper in 1982 after IP closed it; Bohemia reopened the mill in 1983. The plywood plant was closed temporarily in 1985 after a section of the roof collapsed.
