= Coos Bay Rail Line =

Railroad line in Oregon, United States

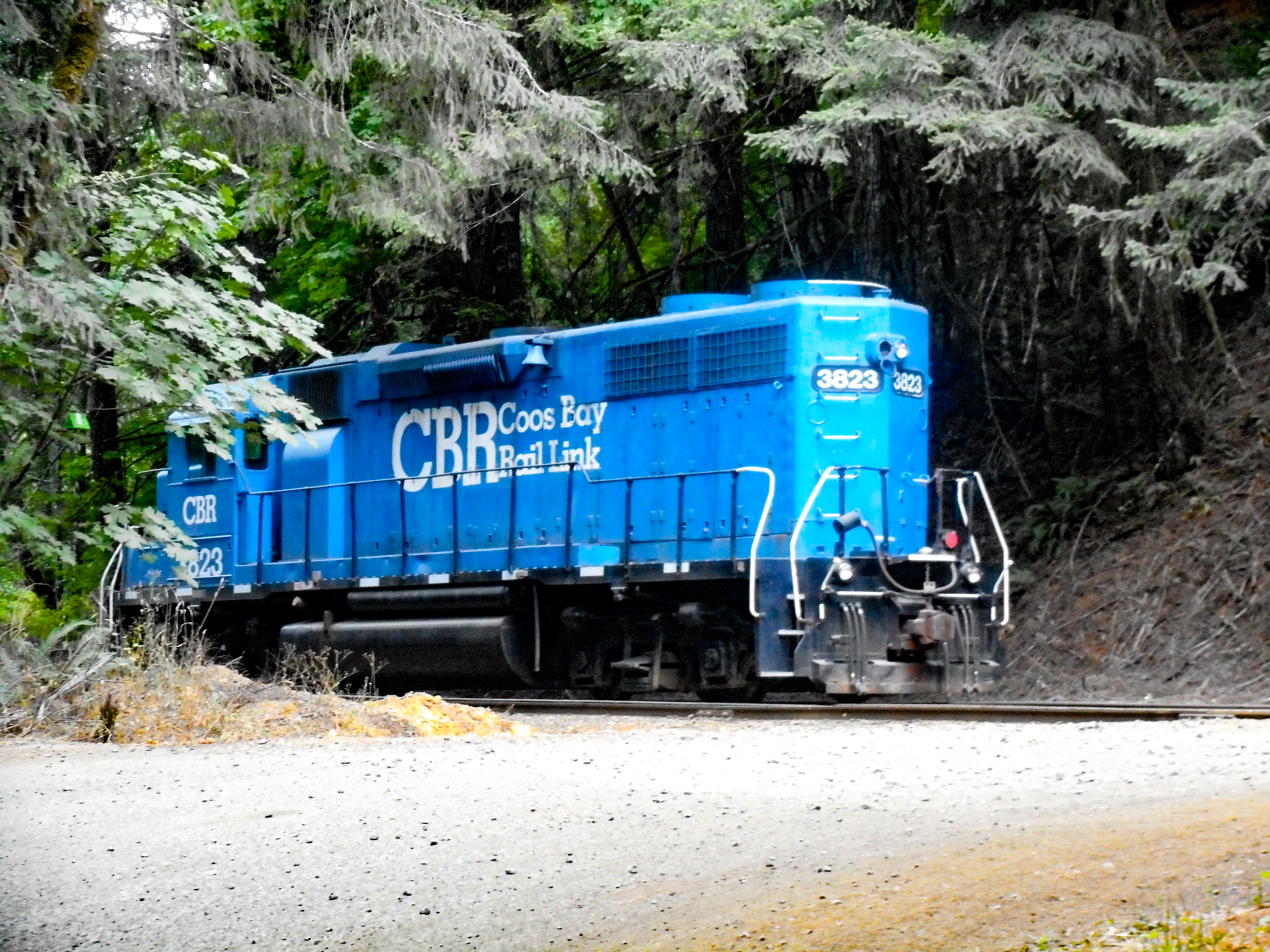
- Locomotive used on Coos Bay Rail Link

Overview
- Operator: Port of Coos Bay
- Reporting mark: CBRL
- Locale: Coquille, Oregon to Eugene, Oregon
- Dates of operation: 2011–present
- Predecessor: Central Oregon and Pacific Railroad

Technical
- Track gauge: 1,435 mm (4 ft 8 1/2 in)
- Length: 134 miles (216 km)
- Operating speed: 5 to 10 miles per hour

Other
- Website: www.portofcoosbay.com

The Coos Bay Rail Line (reporting mark CBRL) is a 134-mile (216 km) railroad line from the Willamette Valley to the Port of Coos Bay on the Oregon Coast and Coquille, Oregon, in the United States. It is owned and operated by the Oregon International Port of Coos Bay. The rail is operated by a subsidiary for the Port of Coos Bay: Coos Bay Rail Line Inc.

== History ==
The line was originally completed in 1916 as the Coos Bay Branch of the Southern Pacific Railroad between Eugene and Powers, Oregon.

On September 21, 2007, Central Oregon and Pacific Railroad (CORP) elected to shut down most of its Coos Bay branch. The track was closed between Vaughn (west of Noti), and Coquille (south of Coos Bay). This action was taken after it was revealed that the nine aging tunnels on the line required repairs that were internally estimated to cost up to $7 million. Some local opinion regarded this action unfavorably, as the railroad asked for state funds to repair its private rail line.

On October 23, 2007, the Port of Coos Bay filed a $15 million lawsuit against CORP in response to its closing of the Coos Bay Branch. The suit claims that CORP failed to provide the required 180 days' notice that it would shut down a leased spur to the bay's North Spit.

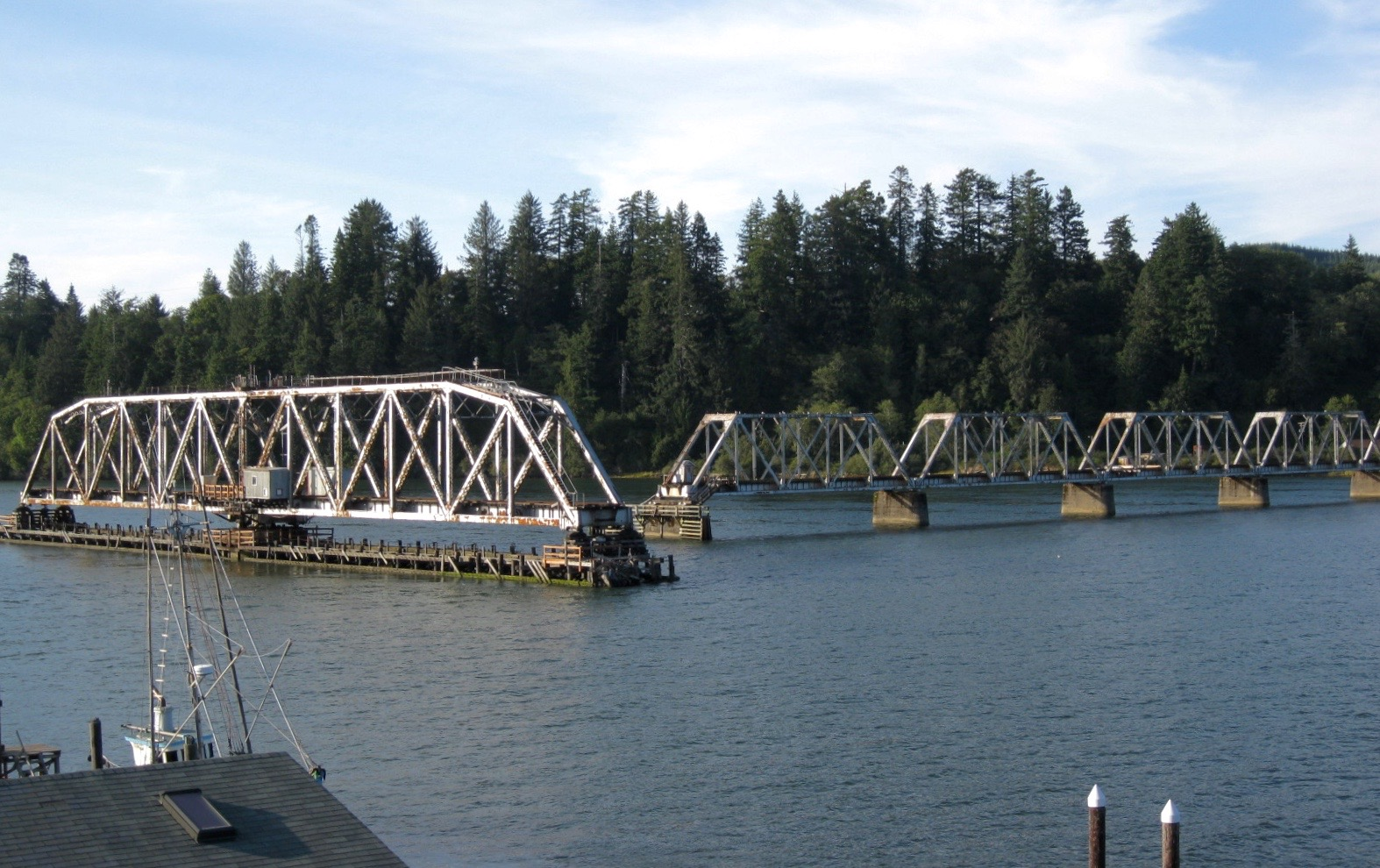
Among the line's many bridges are three swing bridges: this one in Reedsport, and others in Cushman and Coos Bay

On November 21, 2008, the Surface Transportation Board ordered CORP to sell part of the branch to the Port of Coos Bay for $16.6 million. The 111-mile (179 km) segment links Danebo, in northwest Eugene, and Cordes siding, just north of North Bend. The price was much less than what RailAmerica, CORP's corporate parent, had desired ($25 million), and much closer to what the port had initially offered ($15 million). The Port completed the purchase of the line in 2009 and repaired the tunnels that led to the line's closure. The Port reopened the line as Coos Bay Rail Link (CBR). Service from Eugene to North Bend (111 miles) began in October 2011.

In 2012, the railroad continued with a $30 million rehabilitation of the line funded primarily by grants. Work included fixing the railroad bridge into North Bend, and track infrastructure to Coquille, as well as repairs to track, bridges, and crossings on the entire line. The Eugene Register-Guard reported in its October 14, 2012, edition that the first locomotive to enter North Bend/Coos Bay in 5 years did so on October 12, 2012. It did not mark the official reopening of this stretch of track. The locomotive was part of a work train hauling materials into the area to do repairs on the line.

On April 29, 2013, the railroad ran its first freight train out of Coquille, pulling the first rail cars of plywood from the Roseburg Forest Products mill in Coquille in five and a half years. This run marked the restoration of service in the entire CBR line. Also in that year, the CBR and the Port signed a ten year agreement permitting the railroad to be the regulator operator of the rail line.

In early 2014, the publication Railway Age selected the railroad as the 2014 Short Line Railroad of the Year.

== See also ==
- Coos Bay Limited — former passenger service along the line 1914–1959

Preceded by Gardendale Railroad	Short Line Railroad of the Year; 2014	Succeeded by Palmetto Railways
