= Coquille Valley School =

Location
- 1115 N. Baxter; Coquille, Coos County, Oregon 97423; United States; 43.184647°N 124.187370°W

Information
- Type: Public
- School district: Coquille School District
- Principal: Mark Nortness
- Grades: 3-8
- Colors: Red and white
- Mascot: Wildcat
- Website: Coquille Valley School website

Coquille Valley School is a public school in Coquille, Oregon, United States.

Coquille Valley School is actually two separate schools housed in one building. Coquille Valley Intermediate School is more of an elementary model with students in grades 3-5 learning in a self-contained educational environment. Coquille Valley Middle School is a more traditional grade 6-8 middle school setting where students travel to 6 different classrooms for instruction.

The school mascot is a wildcat.
