= South Fork Coquille River =

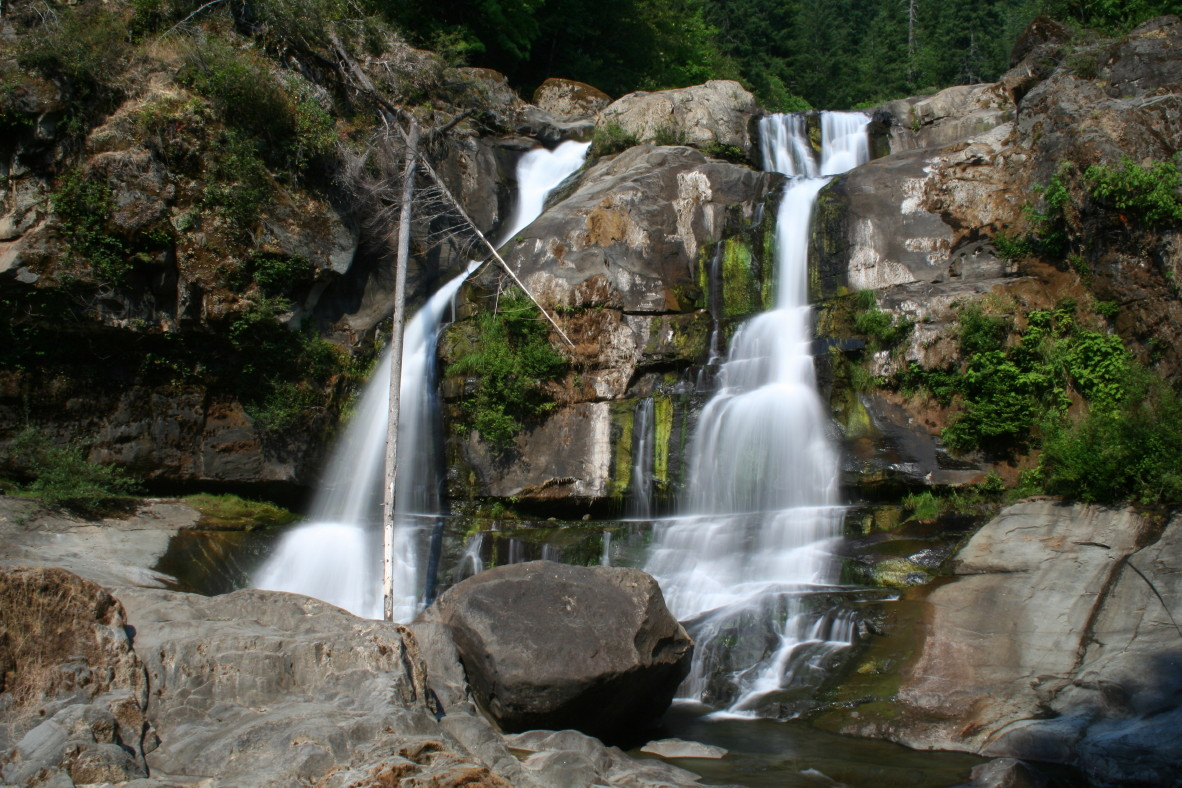
- The lower tier of Coquille River Falls at low water

- Location of the mouth of the South Fork Coquille River in Oregon

Location
- Country: United States
- State: Oregon
- Region: Coos County
- Cities: Powers, Broadbent, Myrtle Point

Physical characteristics
- Source: Southern Oregon Coast Range
  - location: Unnamed ridge, north of Mount Bolivar
  - coordinates: 42°50′24″N 123°52′30″W
  - elevation: 3,501 ft (1,067 m)
- Mouth: Coquille River
  - location: Myrtle Point
  - coordinates: 43°04′49″N 124°08′29″W
  - elevation: 13 ft (4.0 m)
- Length: 62.8 mi (101.1 km)
- Basin size: 288 sq mi (750 km^{2})
- Discharge
  - location: Powers
  - average: 778 cu ft/s (22.0 m^{3}/s)
  - minimum: 7.2 cu ft/s (0.20 m^{3}/s)
  - maximum: 48,900 cu ft/s (1,380 m^{3}/s)

Basin features
- Tributaries
  - left: Johnson Creek, Salmon Creek, Dement Creek, Catching Creek
  - right: Wooden Rock Creek, Coal Creek, Woodward Creek, Middle Fork Coquille River

The South Fork Coquille River is the longest tributary of the Coquille River in coastal Oregon in the United States. From its headwaters in the Southern Oregon Coast Range, the river flows northwest to join the North Fork Coquille River at Myrtle Point, forming the main stem Coquille. The South Fork is about 63 miles (101 km) long, and its watershed drains roughly 288 square miles (750 km^{2}) of rural Coos County.

== Course ==
The South Fork rises as a small stream draining out of Eden Valley, 2.5 miles (4.0 km) northwest of Mount Bolivar in the Siskiyou National Forest. Picking up scores of tributaries, such as Wooden Rock, Clear and Panther Creeks, the river gains volume as it flows southwest into a deep gorge. At the confluence with Rock Creek, the river abruptly swings north, receiving Johnson Creek from the left a few miles further downstream. Now a fairly large stream, the South Fork winds through canyons to the confluence with Coal Creek before entering an alluvial valley near the small community of Powers.

Below the city, the South Fork flows north through a canyon into another broad valley, now followed by Oregon Route 542, and passing Coquille Myrtle Grove State Natural Site and Albert H. Powers Memorial State Park. About a mile downstream, Dement Creek enters from the left and the terrain around the river transforms from hills to farmland. As it assumes a meandering course, the river passes Broadbent, then the Middle Fork Coquille River, by far the largest tributary, enters from the right, marking the head of tide. A few miles onward, the river passes Myrtle Point and meets the North Fork to form the Coquille River about 36 miles (58 km) upstream of the Pacific Ocean.

The South Fork Coquille River has two major waterfalls, situated in a steep and remote canyon just upstream of the first major northward bend of its course. These are the 35-foot (11 m) Upper Coquille River Falls, and the much larger 110-foot (34 m) Coquille River Falls.

== Watershed ==
The watershed is sparsely populated, with most of the people concentrated in the towns of Powers and Myrtle Point. Anadromous fish including salmon and steelhead inhabit much of the river, but some habitat has been compromised due to poor watershed management practices such as excessive logging and clearing.

== See also ==
- List of longest streams of Oregon
- List of rivers of Oregon
