= Coos Bay Limited =

Overview
- Service type: Inter-city rail
- Status: Discontinued
- Locale: Oregon
- First service: October 1, 1914
- Last service: June 4, 1953
- Former operator: Southern Pacific Railroad

Route
- Termini: Portland; Marshfield
- Service frequency: daily

Technical
- Track gauge: 4 ft 8 1/2 in (1,435 mm)

The Coos Bay Limited was a named passenger train of the Southern Pacific Railroad. It operated along the company's Coos Bay Branch, connecting Portland to the port city and other communities along the Siuslaw River. The service was inaugurated on October 1, 1914. At Coos Bay, Southern Pacific Steamship Lines provided steamship connections to San Francisco. It ran as far as Myrtle Point until 1917. By 1919, the lack of diner car and limited dining options along the line led to calls for a sleeper service being added. The train would eventually lose its common name, but a daily round trip Coos Bay run continued. Passenger service along the line ceased after June 4, 1953.
