= Hauser, Oregon =

Unincorporated community in Oregon, United States

- Unincorporated community
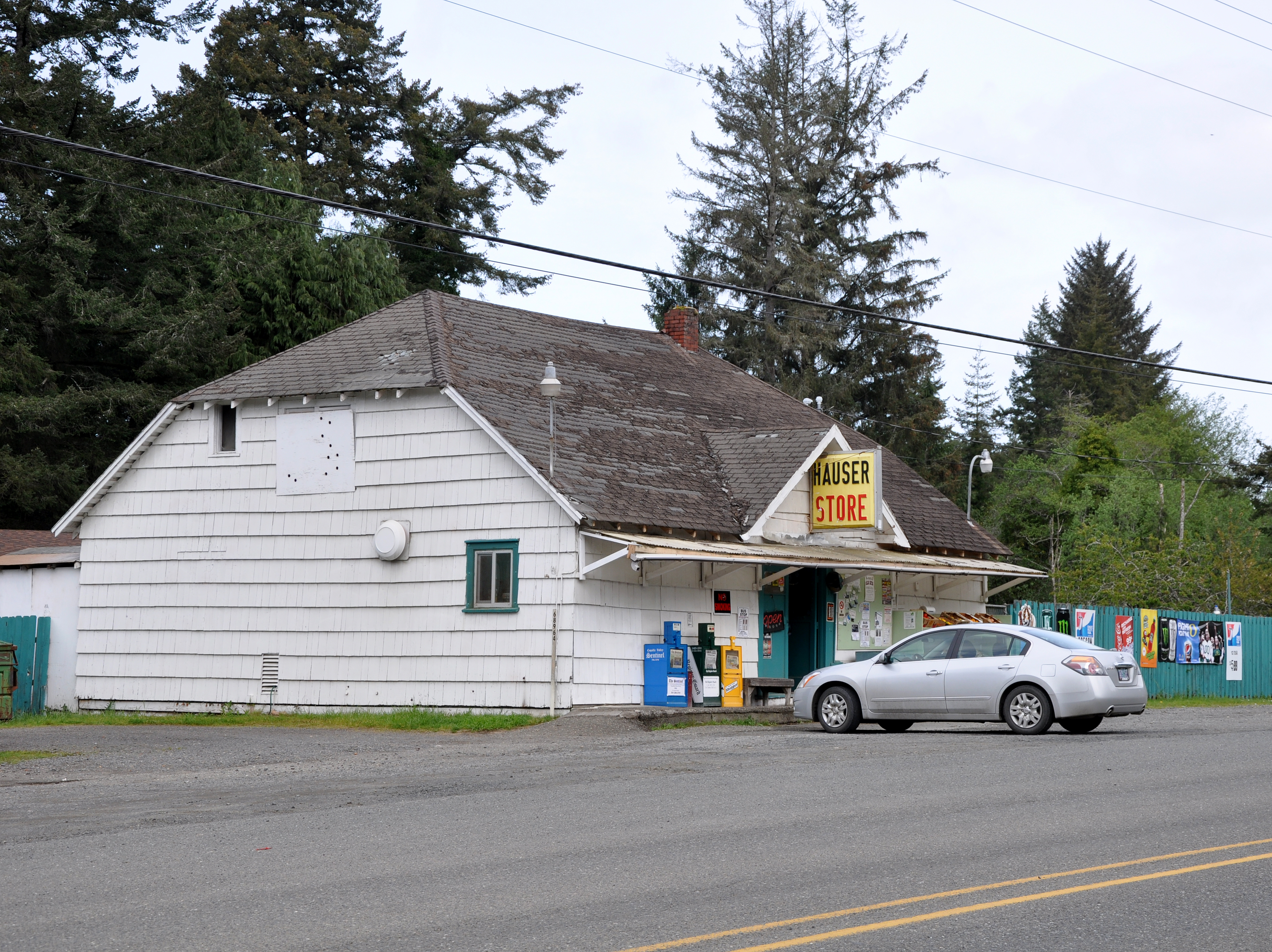
- Hauser Store along Wildwood Road

- Location within the state of Oregon Hauser (the United States)
- Coordinates: 43°29′34″N 124°13′07″W
- Country: United States
- State: Oregon
- County: Coos
- Elevation: 23 ft (7.0 m)
- Time zone: UTC-8 (Pacific (PST))
  - Summer (DST): UTC-7 (PDT)

Hauser is an unincorporated community in Coos County, Oregon, United States. It is along U.S. Route 101, 7 miles (11 km) south of Lakeside and 6 miles (10 km) north of North Bend. Hauser is on the edge of the Oregon Dunes National Recreation Area near North Slough, a tributary of Coos Bay once known as the North Inlet of Coos Bay. It is a station on the Central Oregon and Pacific Railroad (formerly the Southern Pacific).

Hauser was originally named "North Slough" but it was decided the name was unsuitable. It was renamed after Eric V. Hauser of Portland, who, with his sons, had a construction contract on the railroad in about 1914. Hauser is also the namesake of the library at Reed College in Portland and he once owned the Multnomah Hotel. Hauser post office ran from 1915 to 1957.

Charles D. McFarlin of Massachusetts built the first known cranberry bog on the West Coast in what is now Hauser in 1884.
