= Tiernan, Oregon =

Unincorporated community in the state of Oregon, United States

Coordinates: 44°00′57″N 123°56′24″W

Tiernan is an unincorporated community in Lane County, Oregon, United States. It is about five miles west of Mapleton on Oregon Route 126 near the Siuslaw River and within the Siuslaw National Forest.

The community of Tiernan was named for R. Tiernan of San Francisco, who was leasing a local sawmill. The Southern Pacific Coos Bay Line railroad station at this locale was named "Beck" or "Beck Station" after an early station master, but it was never the name of the community. Tiernan post office ran from 1919 through 1970. The railway is now part of the Coos Bay Rail Link.
