= Coquille High School =

Public school in Coquille, Oregon, United States

Coquille Junior Senior High

Location
- 499 W Central Blvd; Coquille, Coos County, Oregon 97423; United States; 43.185557°N 124.194211°W

Information
- Type: Public
- School district: Coquille School District
- Principal: Paige Yi
- Grades: 7-12
- Enrollment: 360 (2024-2025)
- Colors: Red and white
- Athletics conference: OSAA 2A-4 Sunset Conference
- Mascot: Red Devils
- Team name: Red Devils
- Website: Coquille HS website
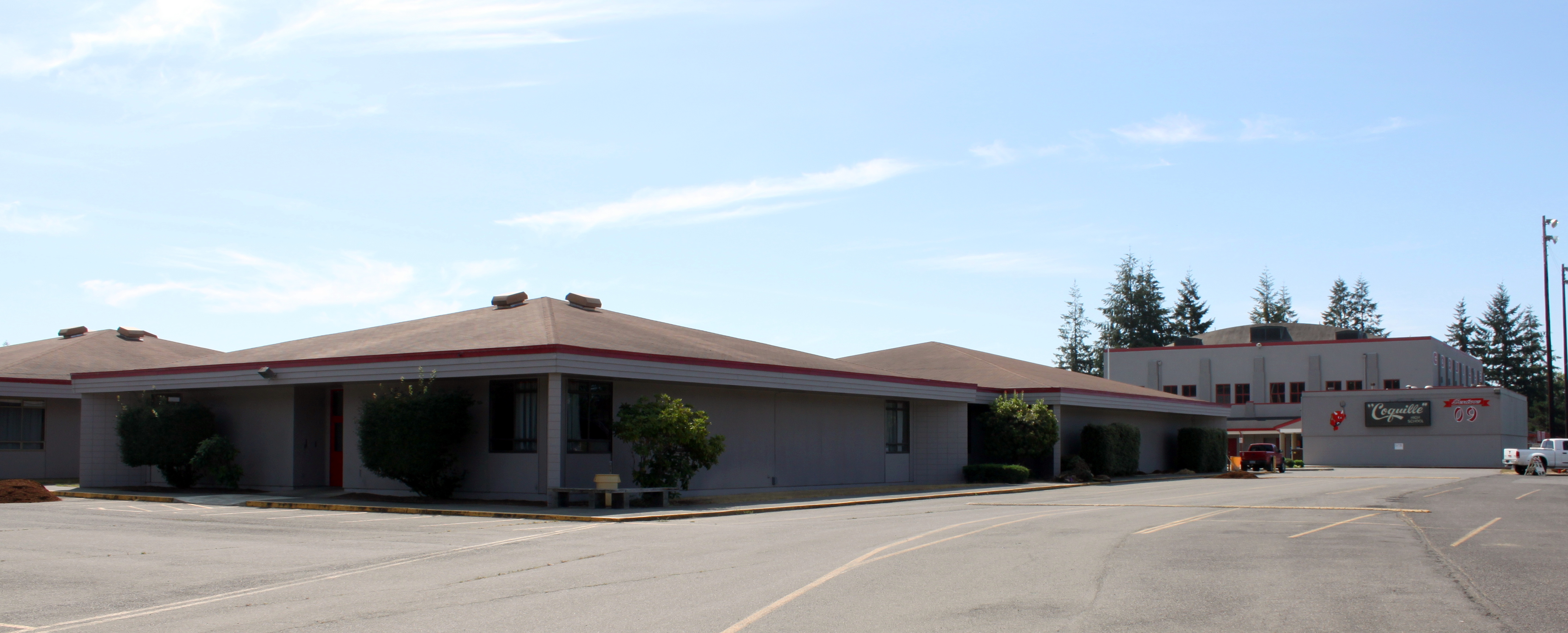

Coquille Junior Senior High, formerly known as Coquille High School, is a public high school in Coquille, Oregon, United States.

== Students ==
According to the Oregon Department of Education School Report Card for the 2017–2018 school year, Coquille Junior Senior High enrolled 324 students in grades 7-12.

== Academics ==
93% of high school students attending Coquille Junior Senior High graduated with a high school diploma on time for the 2017–2018 school year.

== Mascot ==
Historically the Red Devil Baby in numerous forms has been the mascot of Coquille High School.

== Sports ==
The Coquille Football team won the 2A state championship in 2021 versus the Kennedy Trojans in a 38 to 28 victory. It's the school's first football state championship win since 1970. Gunner Yates was a menace in this game, running for 388 yards and 5 touchdowns. In 2022, the Coquille Girls Track and Field team won the 2A state title, the first ever girls' team state title for Coquille. In 2023 they repeated that feat at the 3A level with top scorer Callie Millet winning the individual javelin state title, and taking fifth and sixth in pole vault and discus respectively. Other point scorers include Reagan Krantz, who took first in pole vault, alongside Holli Vigue winning the discus. Melanie Lambson placed third in the long jump, and Trinidy Blanton placed second in javelin, fifth in long jump, fifth in the 200 meter dash. Emelia Wirebaugh placed third in the triple jump, and Ada Millet placed thirteenth in the 1500 meter run, and eighth in the 800 meter run. In 2024 they completed a three-pet.
