= Cushman, Oregon =

Unincorporated community in the state of Oregon, United States

- Unincorporated community
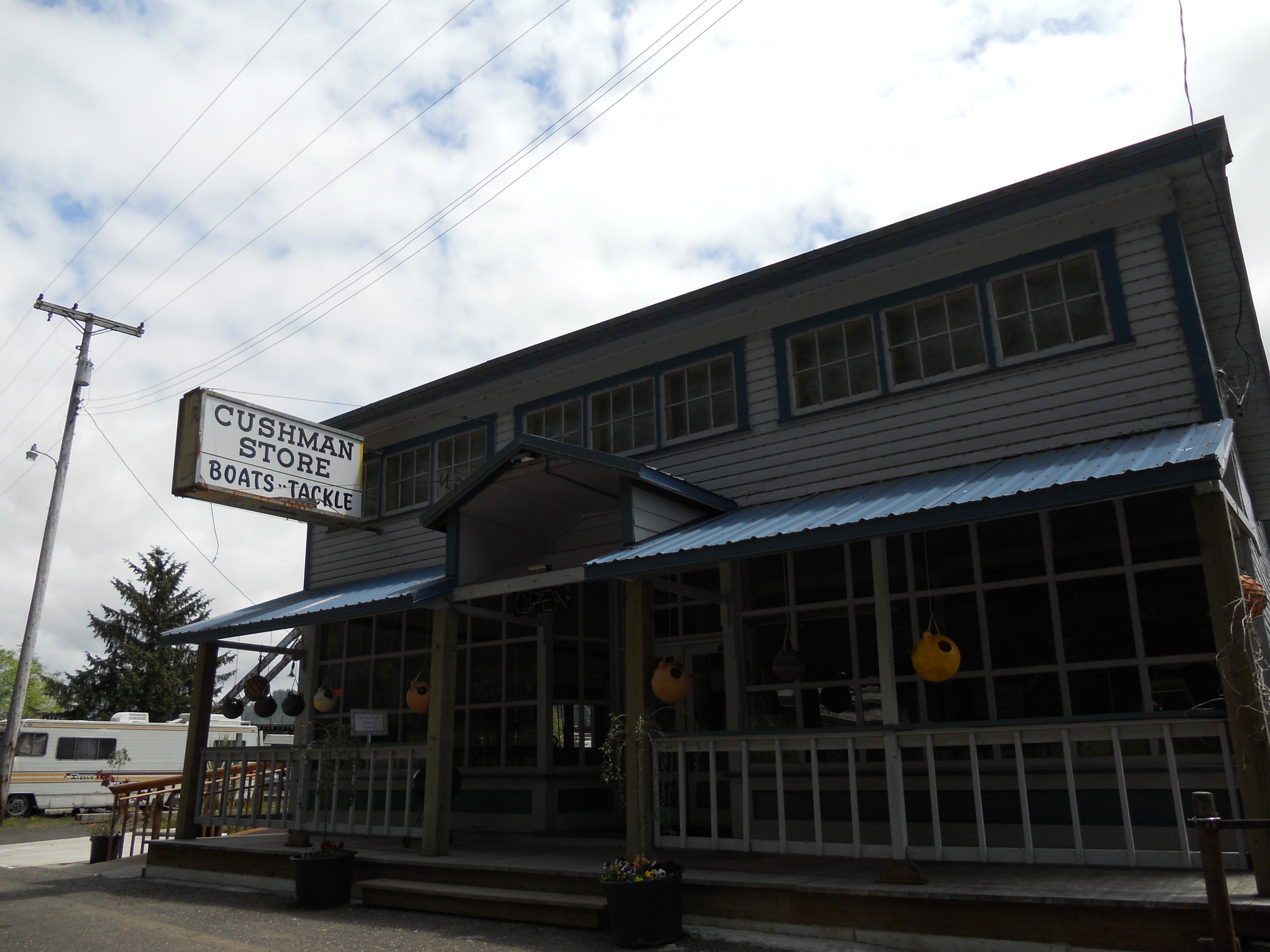
- Cushman Store

- Location within Oregon Location within the United States
- Coordinates: 43°59′08″N 124°02′39″W
- Country: United States
- State: Oregon
- County: Lane
- Named after: local residents C. C. and I. B. Cushman
- Elevation: 13 ft (4.0 m)
- Time zone: UTC-8 (PST)
  - Summer (DST): UTC-7 (PDT)
- Area code: 541
- GNIS feature ID: 1140573

Cushman is an unincorporated community in Lane County, Oregon, United States. It is located on the north bank of the Siuslaw River on Oregon Route 126, between Tiernan and Florence.

Cushman was a station on the Coos Bay Branch of the Southern Pacific Railroad (today the Coos Bay Rail Link), named for local residents C. C. and I. B. Cushman. It was a mile east of the community of Acme, but the railroad already had a station named Acme, so the name "Cushman" was chosen instead. The post office was moved from Acme in 1916 and renamed to match the station; it closed in 1961.

Cushman has a historic store that was built in 1889 and expanded in 1925, and there is a swing span railroad bridge across the river there. The bridge opened to allow ocean-going barges to reach a now-closed sawmill in Mapleton. In 1940, Cushman had a population of 145 and a full-service port. At that time the hills above the community produced Port Orford-cedar, a large evergreen coniferous tree native to the region, but by 1990, this resource was depleted and the port no longer served ocean-going vessels.
