= Coquille River =

Coquille River may refer to:

- Coquille River (Oregon)
- Coquille River (Normandin River), in Saguenay-Lac-Saint-Jean, Quebec, Canada

== See also ==
- Coquille River Falls, a two-tier waterfall located in the far north tip of the Rogue River–Siskiyou National Forest, just east of Port Orford, on the Oregon coast in Coos County, Oregon
