= Coquille, Oregon =

- City
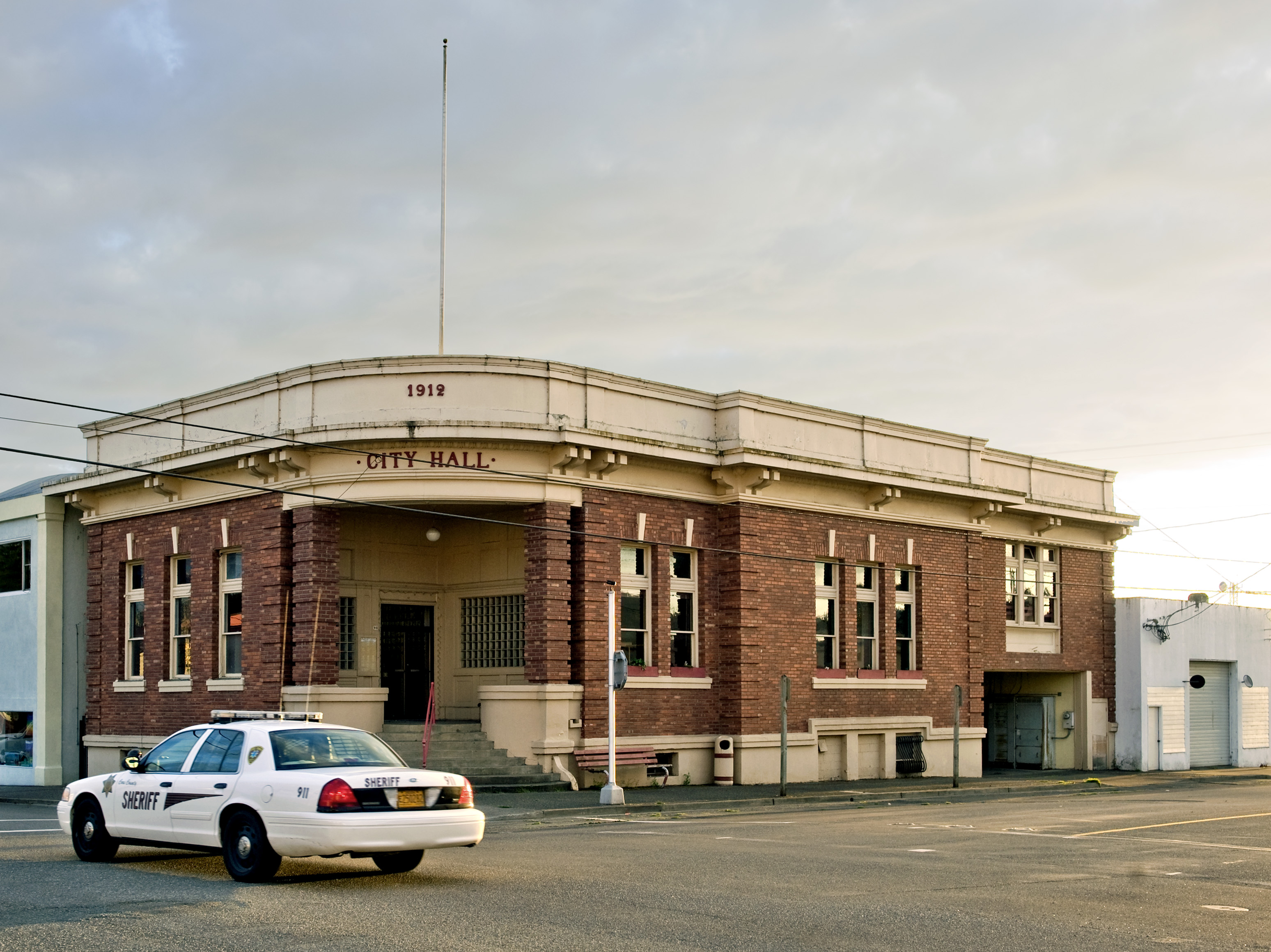
- Coquille City Hall

- Flag

- Location in Oregon
- Coordinates: 43°10′48″N 124°11′03″W
- Country: United States
- State: Oregon
- County: Coos
- Incorporated: 1885

Government
  - Mayor: Sam Flaherty

Area
  - Total: 2.80 sq mi (7.26 km^{2})
  - Land: 2.76 sq mi (7.16 km^{2})
  - Water: 0.039 sq mi (0.10 km^{2})
- Elevation: 62 ft (19 m)

Population (2020)
  - Total: 4,015
  - Density: 1,452.7/sq mi (560.89/km^{2})
- Time zone: UTC−8 (Pacific)
  - Summer (DST): UTC−7 (Pacific)
- ZIP code: 97423
- Area code: 541
- FIPS code: 41-15350
- GNIS feature ID: 2410226
- Website: www.cityofcoquille.org

Coquille /koʊˈkiːl/ is a city in and the county seat of Coos County, Oregon, United States. The population was 4,015 at the 2020 census. The primary economic base is the timber industry. The city derives its name from the Coquille Native American tribe.

== History ==
Before European-American settlement, the area around present-day Coquille was home to several villages of the Upper Coquille people, who lived along the river that would later share their name. The mid-1850s brought a wave of violence to the region as gold-seekers moved into Coquille and Coos territory. In January 1854, a dispute between a Nasomah man and a ferryman near the mouth of the Coquille River escalated when a vigilante group of local miners formed in response. An Indian agent later described the resulting attack as a massacre carried out against a portion of the local population. Between 1851 and 1855, repeated attacks on Coquille villages contributed to a sharp population collapse, with the Native population of Coos and Curry counties falling from roughly 8,000 to a few hundred by the mid-1850s. In the years that followed, the Coquille people signed treaties in 1851 and 1855 ceding more than a million acres of their homeland to the federal government, and many were forced north to the Siletz Reservation following the Rogue River Wars, though some resisted removal or later returned to their traditional lands.

American settlement of the townsite itself began shortly after this period of conflict. The Coquille River gave access to the fertile Coquille Valley and the timbered Coast Range forests upriver as far as Myrtle Point, and the town was established on high ground next to the river, with a post office opening in 1870. Early local enterprises included wood and dairy products and coal, and the first sawmill was built on the town's waterfront in 1880 by Bunch, Bennett & Co., with ocean-going sailing ships towed upriver to be loaded with lumber bound for San Francisco markets. The town of Coquille was formally incorporated in 1885, and because the area lacked wagon roads at the time, the community depended heavily on the river for transportation, with steam-powered sternwheelers carrying both passengers and freight between Coquille, Myrtle Point, and Bandon.

Coquille's rise to regional prominence was driven by a combination of transportation access and a long political rivalry with the Coos Bay area. Coquille had been the focal point of early county settlement and became the county's transportation hub, and a twenty-year struggle between Coquille and the Coos Bay area over control of the county seat ended in 1896 when the seat was moved from Empire City to Coquille. Coquille won out largely because it was the only city in the county connected to the rest of the region by three modes of transportation (roads, railroad, and water) and because it satisfied the era's informal standard for a county seat's location: reachable within a day's ride on horseback from any point in the county. That transportation advantage had been secured a few years earlier, in 1893, when the Coos Bay Roseburg & Eastern Railroad & Navigation Company completed a rail line from Marshfield (present-day Coos Bay) to Myrtle Point, connecting the Coquille Valley to a deepwater seaport for the first time. Before the railroad's completion, agricultural products from the Coquille Valley had been shipped out across the difficult Coquille River bar at Bandon; once the line reached Coquille, that trade was diverted through Coos Bay instead, becoming an important part of the port's export economy.

The early twentieth century brought steady industrial growth built on timber. A second sawmill was later sold to Alfred Johnson before burning down in 1910, and a third mill, built just west of town by the Coquille Lumber Company in 1911, was converted during World War I into a Sitka spruce mill supplying wood for military aircraft. Coquille's population grew 125 percent between 1900 and 1920 as agriculture and timber expanded together, and the 1920s became known locally as the town's "boom" or "golden" years, with population climbing 66 percent over the decade, from 1,642 residents in 1920 to 2,732 in 1930, at its peak representing about 10 percent of the entire county's population.

Coquille's fortunes tracked the broader arc of the Pacific Northwest timber economy through the rest of the century. The town continued to thrive on the strength of its wood-products industry and two large mills even after the Oregon Coast Highway bypassed the city in 1960, since through traffic no longer needed to pass directly through downtown. It was only with major reductions in private and federal timber harvesting, together with the closure of a Georgia-Pacific mill, that the local economy faltered in the 1980s. Coquille shares its name with both the river that runs through it and the Coquille Indian Tribe, whose ancestors' villages once stood along its banks, a history that the modern city of roughly 3,900 residents, still centered on the Coos County Courthouse and the volunteer-run Sawdust Theatre, continues to reckon with today.

== Geography and climate ==
According to the United States Census Bureau, the city has a total area of 2.80 square miles (7.25 km^{2}), of which 2.76 square miles (7.15 km^{2}) is land and 0.04 square miles (0.10 km^{2}) is water.

Coquille is bordered by the Coquille River which drains part of the Coastal Range into the Pacific Ocean at Bandon.

According to the Köppen climate classification, Coquille has a warm-summer Mediterranean climate (Csb). The record high temperature is 103 °F (39 °C), set on September 10, 2022. The record low temperature is 8 °F (−13.3 °C), set on December 22, 1990. There an average of 1.4 afternoons with a temperature of at least 90 °F (32.2 °C) per year. Conversely, there are 37.6 mornings with a temperature of 32 °F (0.0 °C) or lower.

Climate data for Coquille, Oregon, 1991–2020 normals, extremes 1942–1954, 1971–present (Note: COQUILLE 1942–1954, COQUILLE CITY 1971–PRESENT)
Month	Jan	Feb	Mar	Apr	May	Jun	Jul	Aug	Sep	Oct	Nov	Dec	Year
Record high °F (°C)	74 (23)	85 (29)	83 (28)	91 (33)	95 (35)	94 (34)	94 (34)	98 (37)	103 (39)	102 (39)	79 (26)	73 (23)	107 (42)
Mean maximum °F (°C)	67.2 (19.6)	70.8 (21.6)	72.4 (22.4)	76.5 (24.7)	80.1 (26.7)	80.8 (27.1)	82.1 (27.8)	83.4 (28.6)	87.6 (30.9)	83.2 (28.4)	72.4 (22.4)	64.6 (18.1)	91.4 (33.0)
Mean daily maximum °F (°C)	54.7 (12.6)	56.5 (13.6)	57.9 (14.4)	60.4 (15.8)	64.6 (18.1)	68.3 (20.2)	72.2 (22.3)	73.6 (23.1)	73.0 (22.8)	67.0 (19.4)	58.8 (14.9)	53.6 (12.0)	63.4 (17.4)
Daily mean °F (°C)	45.9 (7.7)	46.9 (8.3)	48.2 (9.0)	50.6 (10.3)	54.8 (12.7)	58.3 (14.6)	61.9 (16.6)	62.5 (16.9)	60.4 (15.8)	55.1 (12.8)	49.3 (9.6)	45.0 (7.2)	53.2 (11.8)
Mean daily minimum °F (°C)	37.1 (2.8)	37.3 (2.9)	38.6 (3.7)	40.7 (4.8)	44.9 (7.2)	48.4 (9.1)	51.5 (10.8)	51.4 (10.8)	47.7 (8.7)	43.2 (6.2)	39.8 (4.3)	36.4 (2.4)	43.1 (6.1)
Mean minimum °F (°C)	27.5 (−2.5)	28.6 (−1.9)	30.4 (−0.9)	32.8 (0.4)	36.1 (2.3)	40.8 (4.9)	44.8 (7.1)	44.5 (6.9)	39.8 (4.3)	33.1 (0.6)	28.7 (−1.8)	26.2 (−3.2)	23.3 (−4.8)
Record low °F (°C)	12 (−11)	11 (−12)	24 (−4)	26 (−3)	30 (−1)	33 (1)	38 (3)	37 (3)	31 (−1)	24 (−4)	18 (−8)	8 (−13)	8 (−13)
Average precipitation inches (mm)	8.72 (221)	6.61 (168)	7.06 (179)	5.01 (127)	2.73 (69)	1.44 (37)	0.34 (8.6)	0.37 (9.4)	1.26 (32)	3.65 (93)	7.66 (195)	10.01 (254)	54.86 (1,393)
Average snowfall inches (cm)	0.1 (0.25)	0.0 (0.0)	0.0 (0.0)	0.0 (0.0)	0.0 (0.0)	0.0 (0.0)	0.0 (0.0)	0.0 (0.0)	0.0 (0.0)	0.0 (0.0)	0.0 (0.0)	0.1 (0.25)	0.2 (0.51)
Average precipitation days (≥ 0.01 in)	20.2	17.7	19.4	18.0	12.7	9.0	3.3	3.5	6.4	13.2	19.7	20.2	163.3
Average snowy days (≥ 0.1 in)	0.1	0.0	0.0	0.0	0.0	0.0	0.0	0.0	0.0	0.0	0.0	0.0	0.1
Source 1: NOAA
Source 2: National Weather Service

== Demographics ==
Historical population
Census	Pop.	Note	%±
1870	100		—
1880	176		76.0%
1890	494		180.7%
1900	728		47.4%
1910	1,398		92.0%
1920	1,642		17.5%
1930	2,732		66.4%
1940	3,327		21.8%
1950	3,523		5.9%
1960	4,370		24.0%
1970	4,437		1.5%
1980	4,481		1.0%
1990	4,121		−8.0%
2000	4,184		1.5%
2010	3,866		−7.6%
2020	4,015		3.9%

=== 2020 census ===
As of the 2020 census, Coquille had a population of 4,015. The median age was 44.2 years. 20.3% of residents were under the age of 18 and 24.3% of residents were 65 years of age or older. For every 100 females there were 94.1 males, and for every 100 females age 18 and over there were 89.6 males age 18 and over.

99.8% of residents lived in urban areas, while 0.2% lived in rural areas.

There were 1,681 households in Coquille, of which 25.9% had children under the age of 18 living in them. Of all households, 43.8% were married-couple households, 17.5% were households with a male householder and no spouse or partner present, and 29.8% were households with a female householder and no spouse or partner present. About 30.4% of all households were made up of individuals and 16.9% had someone living alone who was 65 years of age or older.

There were 1,871 housing units, of which 10.2% were vacant. Among occupied housing units, 65.5% were owner-occupied and 34.5% were renter-occupied. The homeowner vacancy rate was 1.1% and the rental vacancy rate was 5.1%.

Racial composition as of the 2020 census
Race	Number	Percent
White	3,469	86.4%
Black or African American	12	0.3%
American Indian and Alaska Native	70	1.7%
Asian	12	0.3%
Native Hawaiian and Other Pacific Islander	4	0.1%
Some other race	79	2.0%
Two or more races	369	9.2%
Hispanic or Latino (of any race)	263	6.6%

=== 2010 census ===
As of the census of 2010, there were 3,866 people, 1,640 households, and 1,036 families living in the city. The population density was 1,400.7 inhabitants per square mile (540.8/km^{2}). There were 1,828 housing units at an average density of 662.3 per square mile (255.7/km^{2}). The racial makeup of the city was 92.5% White, 0.4% African American, 1.9% Native American, 0.5% Asian, 0.1% Pacific Islander, 1.7% from other races, and 2.9% from two or more races. Hispanic or Latino of any race were 5.3% of the population.

There were 1,640 households, of which 26.7% had children under the age of 18 living with them, 48.0% were married couples living together, 11.3% had a female householder with no husband present, 3.9% had a male householder with no wife present, and 36.8% were non-families. 31.2% of all households were made up of individuals, and 15.4% had someone living alone who was 65 years of age or older. The average household size was 2.30 and the average family size was 2.84.

The median age in the city was 45.5 years. 20.7% of residents were under the age of 18; 7.6% were between the ages of 18 and 24; 21.2% were from 25 to 44; 29.9% were from 45 to 64; and 20.6% were 65 years of age or older. The gender makeup of the city was 48.8% male and 51.2% female.

=== 2000 census ===
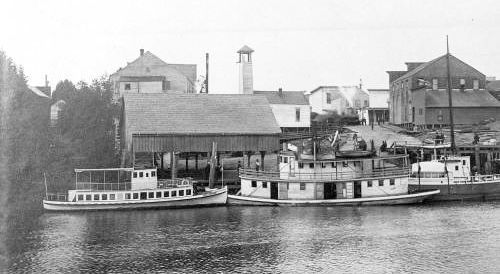
The Coquille waterfront circa 1908−1914 with the motor vessel Wolverine, steamboat Favorite, and motor vessel Wilhelmina at dock. Wolverine was built in Coos Bay in 1908, as was the steamboat Coquille.

As of the census of 2000, there were 4,184 people, 1,686 households, and 1,129 families living in the city. The population density was 1,538.3 inhabitants per square mile (593.9/km^{2}). There were 1,850 housing units at an average density of 680.2 per square mile (262.6/km^{2}). The racial makeup of the city was 92.64% White, 0.50% African American, 1.77% Native American, 0.36% Asian, 0.14% Pacific Islander, 1.60% from other races, and 2.99% from two or more races. Hispanic or Latino of any race were 4.09% of the population.

There were 1,686 households, out of which 28.2% had children under the age of 18 living with them, 51.1% were married couples living together, 12.0% had a female householder with no husband present, and 33.0% were non-families. 28.1% of all households were made up of individuals, and 14.8% had someone living alone who was 65 years of age or older. The average household size was 2.35 and the average family size was 2.83.

In the city, the population dispersal was 22.9% under the age of 18, 7.4% from 18 to 24, 25.3% from 25 to 44, 24.1% from 45 to 64, and 20.1% who were 65 years of age or older. The median age was 42 years. For every 100 females, there were 94.3 males. For every 100 females age 18 and over, there were 91.8 males.

The median income for a household in the city was $29,931, and the median income for a family was $35,144. Males had a median income of $34,583 versus $21,567 for females. The per capita income for the city was $14,619. About 7.6% of families and 10.6% of the population were below the poverty line, including 15.3% of those under age 18 and 6.1% of those age 65 or over.

== Museums and other points of interest ==
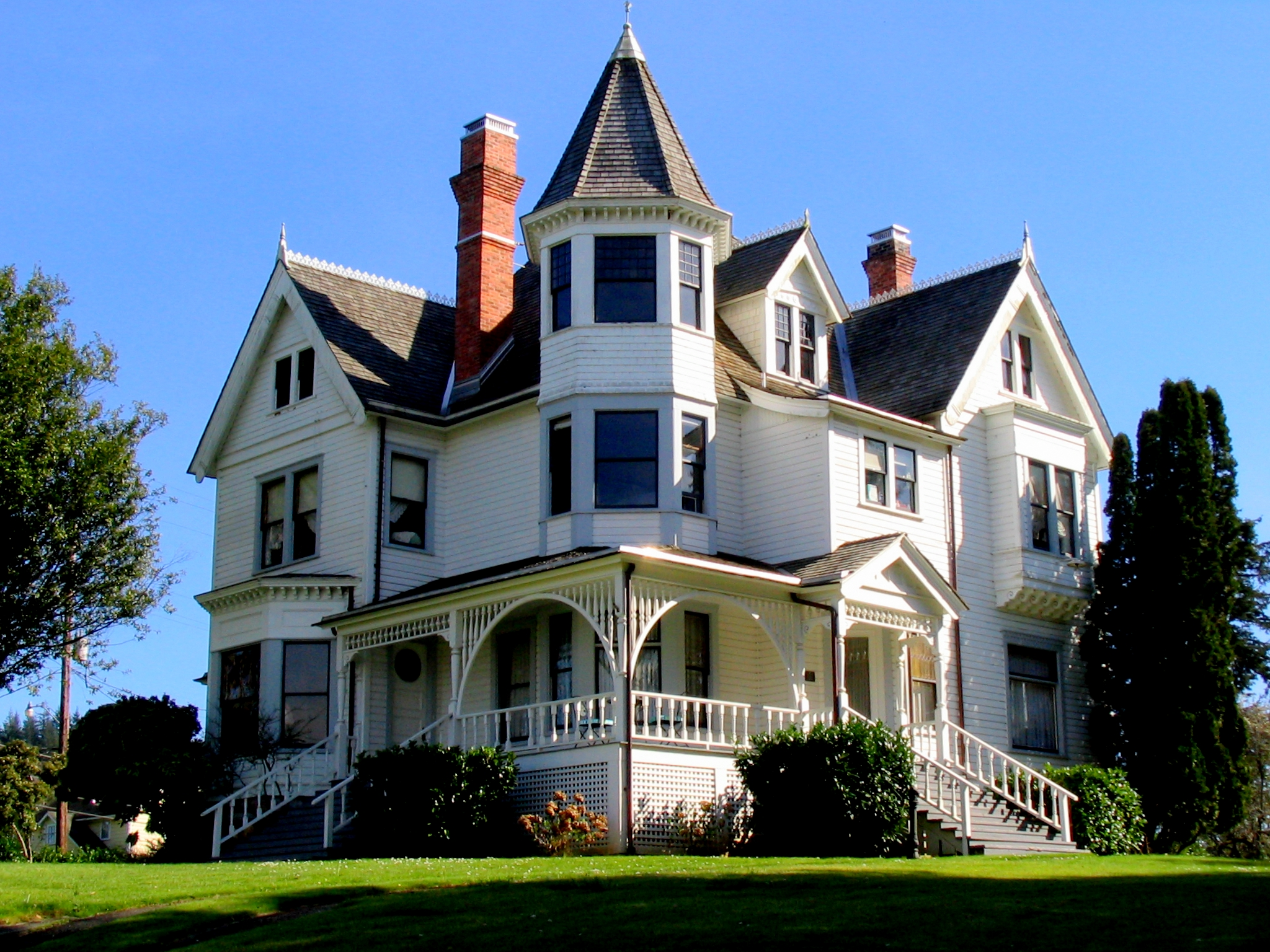
The historic A.J. Sherwood House (built 1901) in Coquille, Oregon is listed on the National Register of Historic Places.

The Coquille Valley Historical Society established the Coquille Valley Museum in May 2005. It features exhibits of tools, antiques, books, photographs, and other materials.

On summer weekends, local volunteers perform in melodramas at the Sawdust Theatre in Coquille. First opened in 1966 and destroyed by fire in 1994, the theater reopened in 2000.

The old City Hall, built in 1912, has been restored, by its owners, Nella and Steve Abbott, and transformed into a gallery featuring art created by prisoners.

== Education ==
The Coquille School District provides K–12 public education for residents of the area. The Lincoln School of Early Learning, Coquille Valley Elementary, Winter Lakes Elementary School, Winter Lakes High School, and Coquille Junior Senior High are all part of the Coquille School District. Southwestern Oregon Community College in nearby Coos Bay offers two-year associate degrees and other academic programs.

== See also ==
- Steamboats of the Coquille River
- Coquille Valley Sentinel
