= Port of Coos Bay =

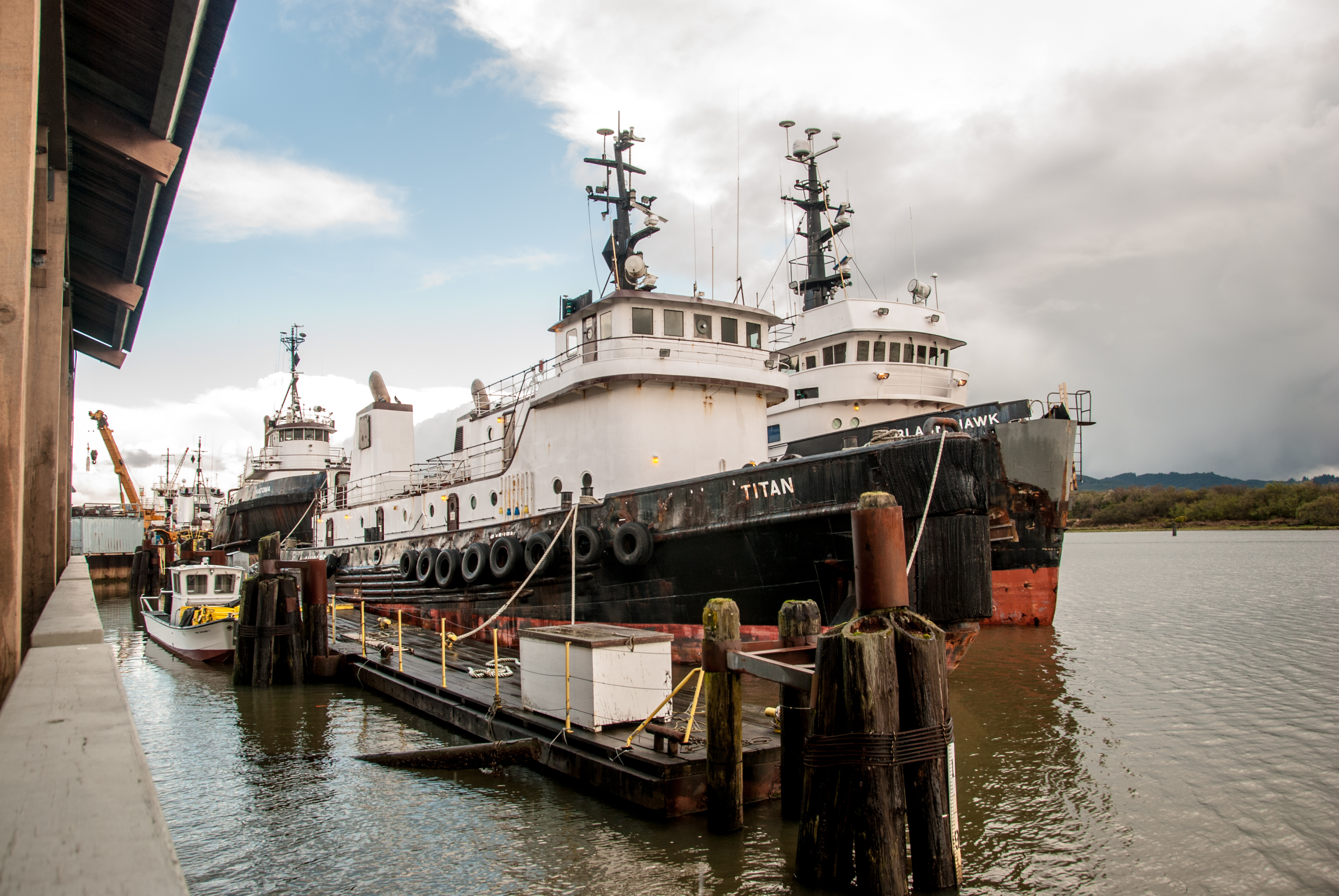
- Port of Coos Bay

Location
- Country: United States
- Location: Coos Bay, Oregon
- Coordinates: 43.42917°N 124.22917°W

Details
- Owned by: Oregon International Port of Coos Bay
- Lumber docks: 3
- Main exports: Wood products

Statistics
- Draft depth: 37 feet
- Air draft: 149 feet, restricted by Conde McCullough Memorial Bridge
- Website www.portofcoosbay.com

The Oregon International Port of Coos Bay is a port of the Pacific coast of the United States, located in Coos Bay near the city of Coos Bay, Oregon. It is the largest deep-draft coastal harbor between San Francisco Bay and Puget Sound, and is Oregon's second busiest maritime commerce center after the Port of Portland. The port operates the 134-mile Coos Bay Rail Link which connects the port to Eugene, Oregon and the national rail network.

In the mid-1900s, the Port of Coos Bay held the title of "world's largest lumber shipping port". Lumber ships loaded with whole-log loads of the region's prized Douglas fir, Western hemlock, and Port Orford cedar timber were a common sight at the docks.

== See also ==
- Jordan Cove Energy Project
