= Coquille School District =

Public school district in Oregon, US

Coquille School District (8) is a public school district that serves the city of Coquille, Oregon, United States.

The Coquille School District #8 is located in Southwestern Oregon 20 miles from the Oregon coast. The Coquille School District operates five schools: Lincoln School of Early Learning - grades pre-school-first grade Coquille Valley Elementary School -2 through 6 and Coquille Junior/Senior High- 7 through 12, Winter Lakes High School an alternative school serving grades 8-12, and Winter Lakes Elementary an alternative school that serves students in grades K-7.

== School Board ==
The Coquille School Board is made up of seven elected officials. Each board member serves a four-year term. Chair: Heather Echavarria Vice-Chair: Roy Wright Director: Julie Nighswonger Director: Steve Britton Director: Melinda Millett Director: Lucas Taylor Director: Cliff Wheeler

== Labor Union Representation ==
Coquille School District teachers are represented by the Coquille Education Association. Classified staff are represented by the Oregon School Employees Association

== Administration ==
Superintendent: Wayne Gallagher, Coquille Jr/Sr High Principal: Jeff Philley, Coquille Valley Elementary Principal: Armando Ruiz, Lincoln School of Early Learning Principal: Maidie Rosengarden, Winter Lakes Elementary Principal: Sharon Nelson, Winter Lakes High School Principal: Tiffany Clapper CTE and Alternative Ed Coordinator: Tony Jones Director of Special Programs: Joan Oakey

== Leadership Team ==
Business Manager: Jerod Nunn Transportation Director: Keryn Ogle Maintenance: Carl Hull Food Service: Valerie Bergstedt Technology: Sean Wirebaugh Human Resources: Rachel Price

== Demographics ==
The district serves approximately 1300 students and employs 180 staff members.

== Schools ==
- Lincoln School of Early Learning - serves pre-school (age 3), pre-kindergarten (age 4), full day kindergarten (age 5), and first grade. The staff works closely with families to create a schedule that meets the needs of early learners.
- Coquille Valley Elementary CVE is home of the Eagles and serves students in grades 2–6.
- Coquille High School

In Coquille High, the junior high, which serves students in grades 7–8, occupies one wing of the school. Students have elective opportunities that include - art, music, foods, CTE, PE, and yearbook. Extra-curricular offerings include robotics, cross country, volleyball, football, basketball (boys & girls), wrestling, track (boys & girls), knowledge bowl.

The high school houses grades 9-12 and is highly rated by the state of Oregon. The Coquille High School graduation rate is frequently in the top 10% in Oregon. Students have opportunities to earn college credits while at Coquille High School through Southwest Oregon Community College. Elective offerings include - Spanish, foods, CTE, careers, drama, art, music, and advanced science classes. Extra-curricular opportunities include robotics, soccer (boys & girls), cross country (boys & girls), volleyball, football (2021 OSAA State Champions), wrestling, basketball (boys & girls), baseball, softball, track (boys & girls), and speech/debate.

=== Alternative Education ===
Winter Lakes School is an alternative school that offers students the option of attending classes on campus or online. Students from 15 area school districts take advantage of WLS learning opportunities. Winter Lakes High School also houses the district's Career Technical Education which includes an on campus cosmetology program, heavy equipment simulators, construction, and electric vehicle production.
