= Oregon Route 542 =

State highway in Coos County, Oregon, US

Oregon Route 542
- Route 542 highlighted in red

Route information
- Maintained by ODOT
- Length: 18.78 mi (30.22 km)
- Existed: 2003–present

Major junctions
- South end: Railroad Avenue and Powers South Road in Powers
- North end: OR 42 near Myrtle Point

Location
- Country: United States
- State: Oregon
- County: Coos

Highway system
- Oregon Highways; Interstate; US; State; Named; Scenic
← OR 540	→ OR 551

Oregon Route 542 (OR 542) is an Oregon state highway running from OR 42 near Myrtle Point to Powers. OR 542 is known as the Powers Highway No. 242 (see Oregon highways and routes). It is 18.78 miles (30.22 km) long and runs north–south, entirely within Coos County.

OR 542 was established in 2003 as part of Oregon's project to assign route numbers to highways that previously were not assigned, and, as of August 2018, was unsigned.

== Route description ==
OR 542 begins at an intersection with OR 42 approximately two miles southeast of Myrtle Point and heads south through Broadbent, Warner, and Gaylord to Powers, where it ends at an intersection with Railroad Avenue and Powers South Road.

== History ==
OR 542 was assigned to the Powers Highway in 2003.

== Major intersections ==
The entire route is in Coos County.

Location	mi	km	Destinations	Notes
Near Myrtle Point	0.00	0.00	OR 42 – Myrtle Point, Roseburg	
Powers	18.91	30.43	Railroad Avenue and Powers South Road	End state maintenance
1.000 mi = 1.609 km; 1.000 km = 0.621 mi
