= Powers, Oregon =

- City
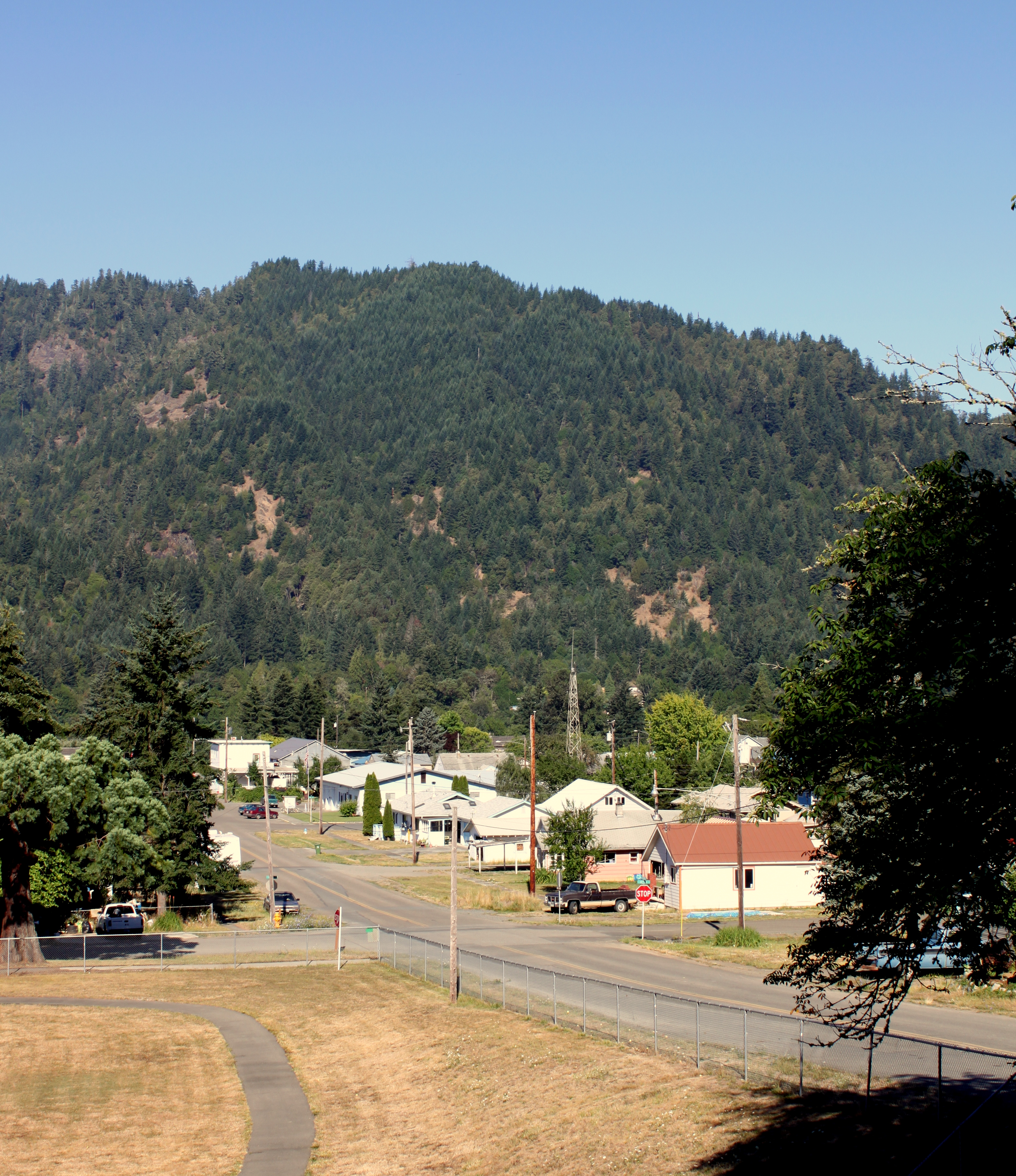
- Powers, Oregon skyline

- Location in Oregon
- Coordinates: 42°53′0″N 124°4′23″W
- Country: United States
- State: Oregon
- County: Coos
- Incorporated: 1945

Government
  - Mayor: Fred Fry

Area
  - Total: 0.63 sq mi (1.64 km^{2})
  - Land: 0.58 sq mi (1.51 km^{2})
  - Water: 0.050 sq mi (0.13 km^{2})
- Elevation: 266 ft (81 m)

Population (2020)
  - Total: 710
  - Density: 1,216.5/sq mi (469.69/km^{2})
- Time zone: UTC-8 (Pacific)
  - Summer (DST): UTC-7 (Pacific)
- ZIP code: 97466
- Area code: 541
- FIPS code: 41-59600
- GNIS feature ID: 2411482
- Website: powersor.govoffice3.com

Powers is a city in Coos County, Oregon, United States. As of the 2020 census, Powers had a population of 710.

== Geography ==
Powers is 21 miles (34 km) south of Oregon Route 42 at Myrtle Point on Oregon Route 542 (Powers Highway) along the South Fork Coquille River. Forest roads connect Powers to the Rogue River, 35 miles (56 km) further south. The Glendale–Powers Bike Trail passes through Powers.

According to the United States Census Bureau, the city has a total area of 0.64 square miles (1.66 km^{2}), of which 0.59 square miles (1.53 km^{2}) is land and 0.05 square miles (0.13 km^{2}) is water.

== Climate ==
Powers has cool, very wet winters and warm, mostly dry summers.

The influence of the Pacific Ocean moderates the climate, especially in the summer when the temperature regularly drops into the upper 40s to lower 50s at night. The coolest month, January, has an average maximum temperature of about 53 °F (12 °C) and an average minimum of about 35 °F (2 °C). August is the warmest month with an average maximum of about 79 °F (26 °C) and an average minimum of about 51 °F (11 °C). The highest temperature recorded was 105 °F (41 °C) on August 4, 1932, and the lowest temperature was 5 °F (−15 °C) on December 31, 1990. Annually, there are 6.5 days with highs of 90 °F (32 °C) or higher and 45.1 days with lows of 32 °F (0 °C) or lower.

Average annual rainfall is 60.74 inches (1,543 mm) and there are an average of 138 days with measurable precipitation. The wettest year was 1996 with 95.35 inches (2,422 mm) and the driest year was 1976 with 31.69 inches (805 mm). The most rainfall in one month was 26.99 inches (686 mm) in November 1973. The greatest 24-hour rainfall was 6.25 inches (159 mm) on November 19, 1996.

While snow is common during the winter in the mountains surrounding Powers, the city itself averages only 2.5 inches (6.4 cm) of snow each year. The snowiest year was 1950 when 18.4 inches (47 cm) fell, including 18.0 inches (46 cm) in January. The most snow in 24 hours was 8.0 inches (20 cm), recorded on February 2, 1989, and again on February 3, 1989.

Powers has a warm-summer Mediterranean climate (Csb) according to the Köppen climate classification system.

Climate data for Powers, Oregon
Month	Jan	Feb	Mar	Apr	May	Jun	Jul	Aug	Sep	Oct	Nov	Dec	Year
Record high °F (°C)	74 (23)	83 (28)	88 (31)	93 (34)	99 (37)	102 (39)	101 (38)	105 (41)	103 (39)	103 (39)	85 (29)	73 (23)	105 (41)
Mean daily maximum °F (°C)	53.9 (12.2)	56.6 (13.7)	59.4 (15.2)	62.7 (17.1)	67.9 (19.9)	72.7 (22.6)	78.6 (25.9)	80.4 (26.9)	79.4 (26.3)	70.0 (21.1)	57.8 (14.3)	51.6 (10.9)	65.9 (18.8)
Mean daily minimum °F (°C)	37.4 (3.0)	37.6 (3.1)	39.1 (3.9)	41.2 (5.1)	46.0 (7.8)	49.9 (9.9)	53.0 (11.7)	52.4 (11.3)	48.6 (9.2)	43.4 (6.3)	40.5 (4.7)	36.6 (2.6)	43.8 (6.6)
Record low °F (°C)	9 (−13)	7 (−14)	23 (−5)	26 (−3)	28 (−2)	31 (−1)	33 (1)	34 (1)	29 (−2)	20 (−7)	17 (−8)	3 (−16)	3 (−16)
Average precipitation inches (mm)	9.37 (238)	7.49 (190)	7.88 (200)	5.42 (138)	2.90 (74)	1.31 (33)	0.29 (7.4)	0.32 (8.1)	1.13 (29)	3.76 (96)	7.93 (201)	10.82 (275)	60.33 (1,532)
Average snowfall inches (cm)	0.3 (0.76)	0.2 (0.51)	0 (0)	0 (0)	0 (0)	0 (0)	0 (0)	0 (0)	0 (0)	0 (0)	0 (0)	0.1 (0.25)	0.6 (1.5)
Average precipitation days	18	16	18	14	11	7	2	3	5	11	16	18	139
Source: — NOAA

== History ==
In 1914, according to Oregon Geographic Names, the city was named for Albert H. Powers, vice president and general manager of the Smith-Powers Logging Company. Powers post office was established in 1915.

== Points of interest ==
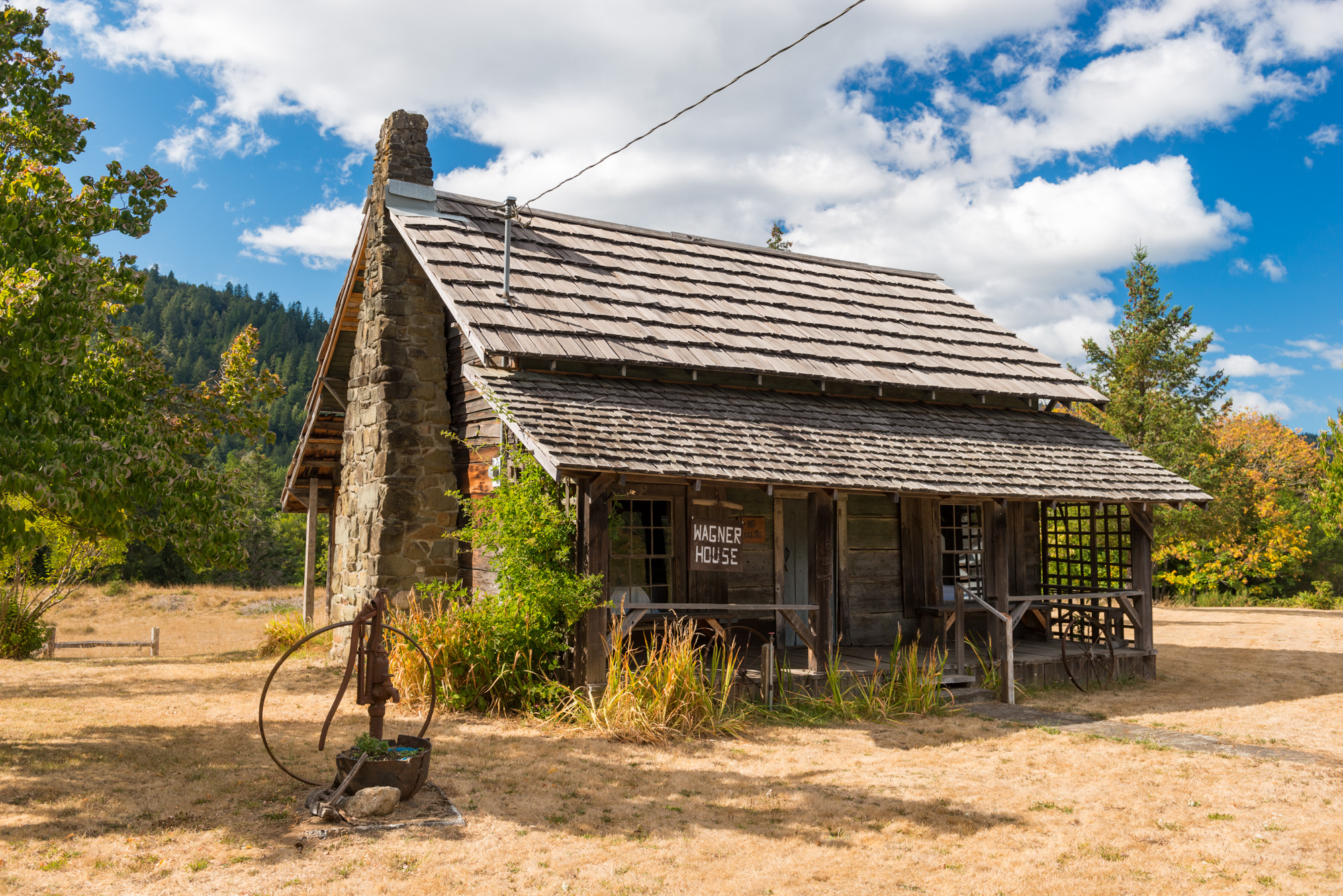
Wagner House

The Wagner House, thought to be the oldest pioneer dwelling in the region, is in Powers adjacent to a railroad museum. Along the main road is the United States Forest Service (USFS) Powers District office. Nearby is Powers County Park, which offers overnight camping and other amenities. About 5 miles (8 km) further south along the Coquille–Rogue Scenic Byway is the Siskiyou National Forest, with many other campgrounds. Powers celebrates Independence Day (July 4) with its White Cedar Days festival.

== Education ==
Powers is served by two public schools: one elementary (K–6) and one high school, Powers High School (7–12).

== Demographics ==
=== 2020 census ===
As of the 2020 census, Powers had a population of 710. The median age was 51.0 years. 19.7% of residents were under the age of 18 and 28.5% of residents were 65 years of age or older. For every 100 females there were 110.7 males, and for every 100 females age 18 and over there were 108.0 males age 18 and over.

There were 333 households in Powers, of which 24.9% had children under the age of 18 living in them. Of all households, 37.8% were married-couple households, 27.9% were households with a male householder and no spouse or partner present, and 25.8% were households with a female householder and no spouse or partner present. About 34.8% of all households were made up of individuals and 21.0% had someone living alone who was 65 years of age or older.

There were 382 housing units, of which 12.8% were vacant. Among occupied housing units, 62.2% were owner-occupied and 37.8% were renter-occupied. The homeowner vacancy rate was 0.9% and the rental vacancy rate was 10.4%.

0% of residents lived in urban areas, while 100.0% lived in rural areas.

Racial composition as of the 2020 census
Race	Number	Percent
White	572	80.6%
Black or African American	0	0%
American Indian and Alaska Native	40	5.6%
Asian	4	0.6%
Native Hawaiian and Other Pacific Islander	1	0.1%
Some other race	18	2.5%
Two or more races	75	10.6%
Hispanic or Latino (of any race)	28	3.9%

=== 2010 census ===
Historical population
Census	Pop.	Note	%±
1920	160		—
1950	895		—
1960	1,366		52.6%
1970	842		−38.4%
1980	819		−2.7%
1990	682		−16.7%
2000	734		7.6%
2010	689		−6.1%
2020	710		3.0%

As of the census of 2010, there were 689 people, 314 households, and 172 families residing in the city. The population density was 1,167.8 inhabitants per square mile (450.9/km^{2}). There were 379 housing units at an average density of 642.4 per square mile (248.0/km^{2}). The racial makeup of the city was 85.1% White, 4.1% Native American, 0.3% Asian, 0.6% from other races, and 10.0% from two or more races. Hispanic or Latino people of any race were 4.4% of the population.

There were 314 households, of which 22.6% had children under the age of 18 living with them, 38.5% were married couples living together, 10.8% had a female householder with no husband present, 5.4% had a male householder with no wife present, and 45.2% were non-families. 34.7% of all households were made up of individuals, and 19.5% had someone living alone who was 65 years of age or older. The average household size was 2.19 and the average family size was 2.81.

The median age in the city was 51.8 years. 19.7% of residents were under the age of 18; 5.4% were between the ages of 18 and 24; 15.8% were from 25 to 44; 34.9% were from 45 to 64; and 24.2% were 65 years of age or older. The gender makeup of the city was 52.0% male and 48.0% female.

=== 2000 census ===
As of the census of 2000, there were 734 people, 334 households, and 184 families residing in the city. The population density was 921.2 inhabitants per square mile (355.7/km^{2}). There were 403 housing units at an average density of 505.8 per square mile (195.3/km^{2}). The racial makeup of the city was 84.06% White, 6.54% Native American, 0.54% Asian, 0.14% Pacific Islander, 0.14% from other races, and 8.58% from two or more races. Hispanic or Latino people of any race were 2.32% of the population.

There were 334 households, out of which 22.8% had children under the age of 18 living with them, 42.2% were married couples living together, 9.0% had a female householder with no husband present, and 44.9% were non-families. 38.3% of all households were made up of individuals, and 21.6% had someone living alone who was 65 years of age or older. The average household size was 2.20 and the average family size was 2.92.

In the city, the population was 24.1% under the age of 18, 5.3% from 18 to 24, 21.3% from 25 to 44, 27.5% from 45 to 64, and 21.8% who were 65 years of age or older. The median age was 45 years. For every 100 females, there were 98.4 males. For every 100 females age 18 and over, there were 95.4 males.

The median income for a household in the city was $21,615, and the median income for a family was $23,750. Males had a median income of $30,536 versus $27,750 for females. The per capita income for the city was $12,544. About 16.3% of families and 23.5% of the population were below the poverty line, including 34.6% of those under age 18 and 13.6% of those age 65 or over.

== Transportation ==
- Powers Airport
