= Coquille River Falls =

Waterfall in Oregon, United States

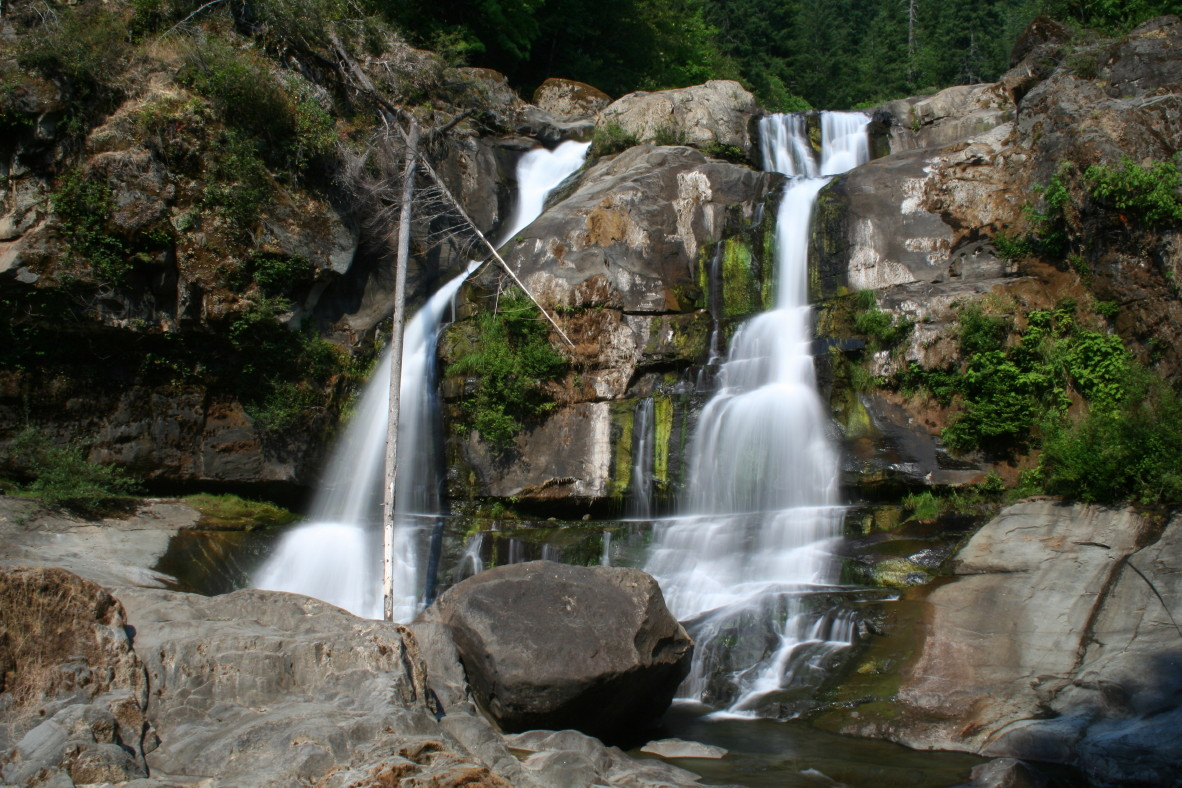
- Lower tier of Coquille River Falls
- Interactive map of Coquille River Falls
- Location: South Fork Coquille River
- Coordinates: 42.7173783°N 124.0214123°W
- Type: Staircase
- Total height: 115 ft (35 m)
- Number of drops: 2
- Average flow rate: 330 cu ft/s (9 m^{3}/s)

Coquiller River Falls, is a two-tier waterfall located in the far north tip of the Rogue River – Siskiyou National Forest, just east of Port Orford, on the Oregon Coast in Coos County, in the U.S. state of Oregon. It totals 115 feet fall in two drops: the upper falls is 50 feet high and the lower tier, the tallest drop, is 65 feet. There are approximately 180 feet from the upper tier to the bottom drop of the waterfall.

== Location ==
The waters of the Coquille River Falls are located at a point where the South Fork Coquille River meets Sru Creek and Drowned Out Creek and is the centerpiece attraction of the Coquille River Falls trailhead that spins off Forest Road 3348 from National Forest road 33.

== History ==
The name of the waterfall and the river the forms it may have stemmed from the Chinook Jargon word "Scoquel", the name given to lamprey eels common in the river and estuaries of the area.

When fur traders settled the Coos Bay area in the mid-1800s, the name Coquille was used to name both the native tribes of the area and the river.

== Natural Area ==
The 500 acres of canyons surrounding the Coquille River Falls are part of a Federal Research Natural Areas. Established in 1945, the Research Area is centered on Port Orford cedar, which constitutes approximately 22% of the total timber volume of the area.

== Geology ==
The waterfall is a continuous cliff of visible rocky outcrop surrounded by a rugged canyon area with a bedrock composed of sedimentary deposits originated during the Tyee formation of the Eocene area.

== See also ==
- List of waterfalls in Oregon
