= Noti, Oregon =

Unincorporated community in the state of Oregon, United States

- Unincorporated community
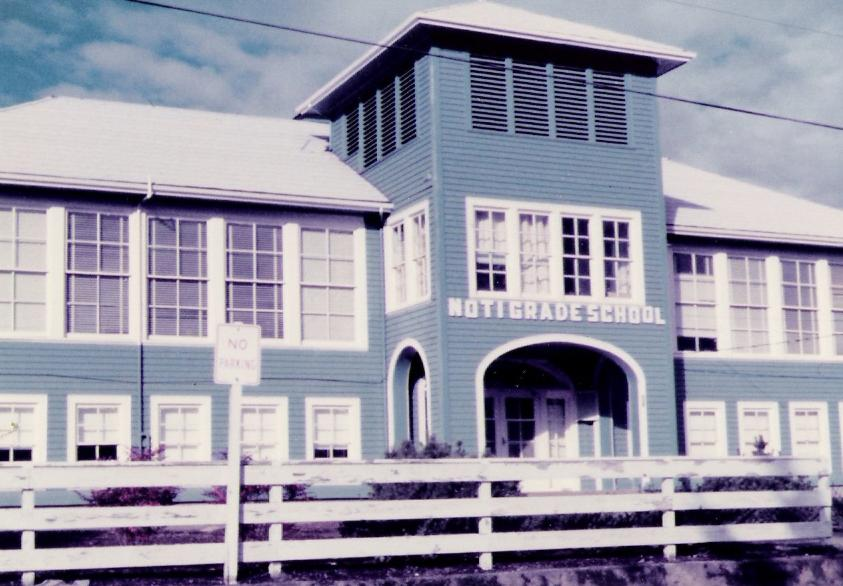
- Former Noti Grade School

- Location within Oregon Location within the United States
- Coordinates: 44°03′32″N 123°26′55″W
- Country: United States
- State: Oregon
- County: Lane
- Elevation: 486 ft (148 m)

Population (2000)
  - Total: 699
- Time zone: UTC-8 (Pacific (PST))
  - Summer (DST): UTC-7 (PDT)
- ZIP codes: 97461
- GNIS feature ID: 1136585

Noti (pronounced NO-tie) is an unincorporated community in Lane County, Oregon, United States, located in the foothills of the Central Oregon Coast Range between Eugene and Florence. Per the 2000 census, Noti had a total population of 699.

== History ==
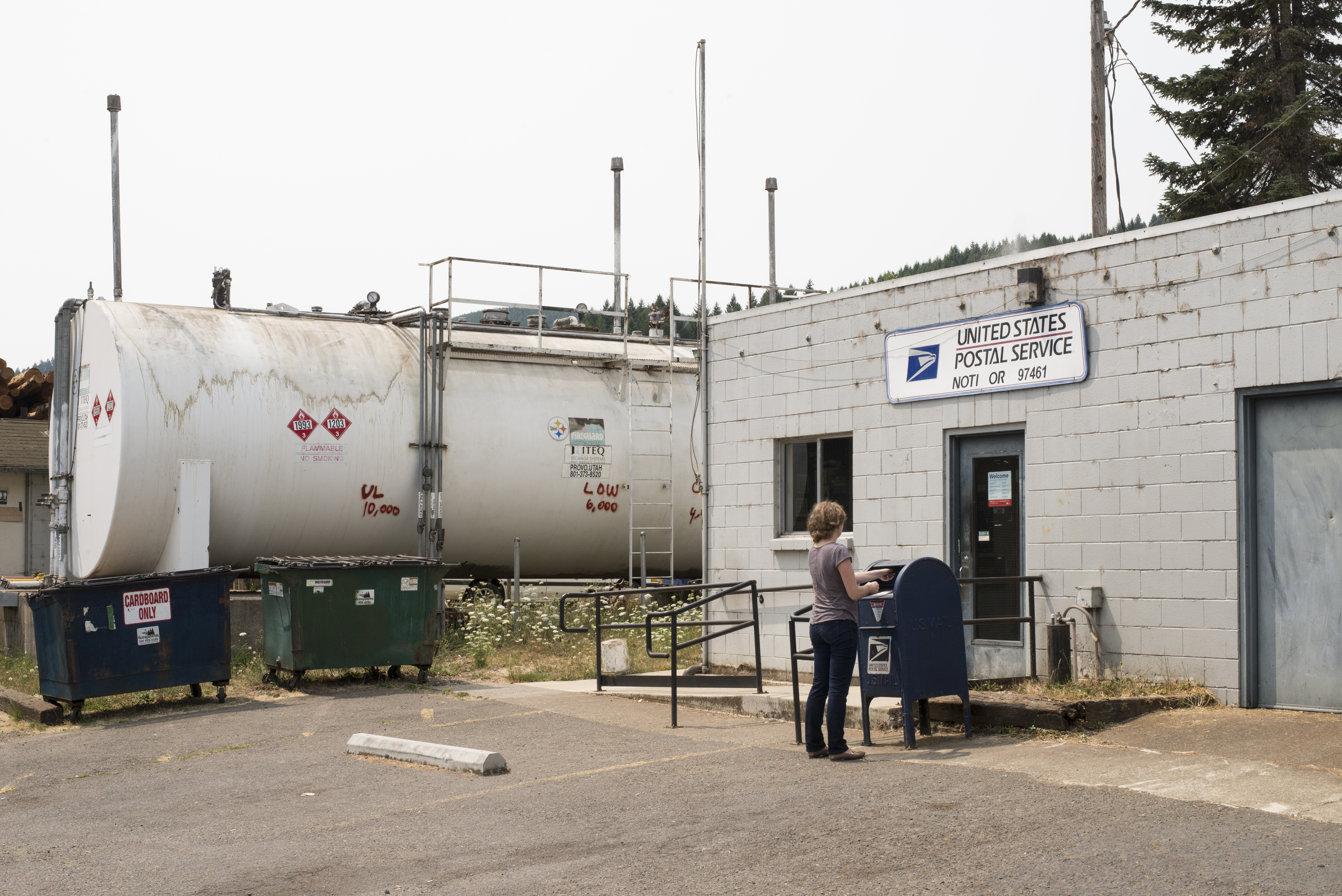
The Post Office in Noti

Noti's post office was established in 1913, when the name was changed from "Portola". The first postmaster was H.G. Suttle. Suttle wrote that the name Noti was what a Native American once exclaimed in frustration with a white man. The white man had not tied up a horse as the native wanted him to during a trip up the Siuslaw River valley, but rather continued on riding the horse to Eugene, leaving the Native American behind. The Indian was heard shouting “no tie!”

Sailor Pioneer cemetery has numerous graves from the first settlers from 1850 on.

In 2002, Noti Grade School, a landmark built in 1927 and known as "The Little Blue School", was closed.

== Geography ==
Noti and the nearby communities of Elmira and Veneta lie on the western edge of the southern Willamette Valley. Fern Ridge Reservoir lies between this cluster of rural areas and the nearest sizable city of Eugene; the community of Crow lies just to the south.

The Long Tom River passes through Noti after originating in the eastern side of the coast range. Once reaching Noti, the river turns east, where it eventually enters the Fern Ridge Reservoir. The river ultimately empties into the Willamette River in two locations.

=== Climate ===
This region experiences warm (but not hot) and dry summers, with no average monthly temperatures above 71.6 °F. According to the Köppen Climate Classification system, Noti has a warm-summer Mediterranean climate, abbreviated "Csb" on climate maps.

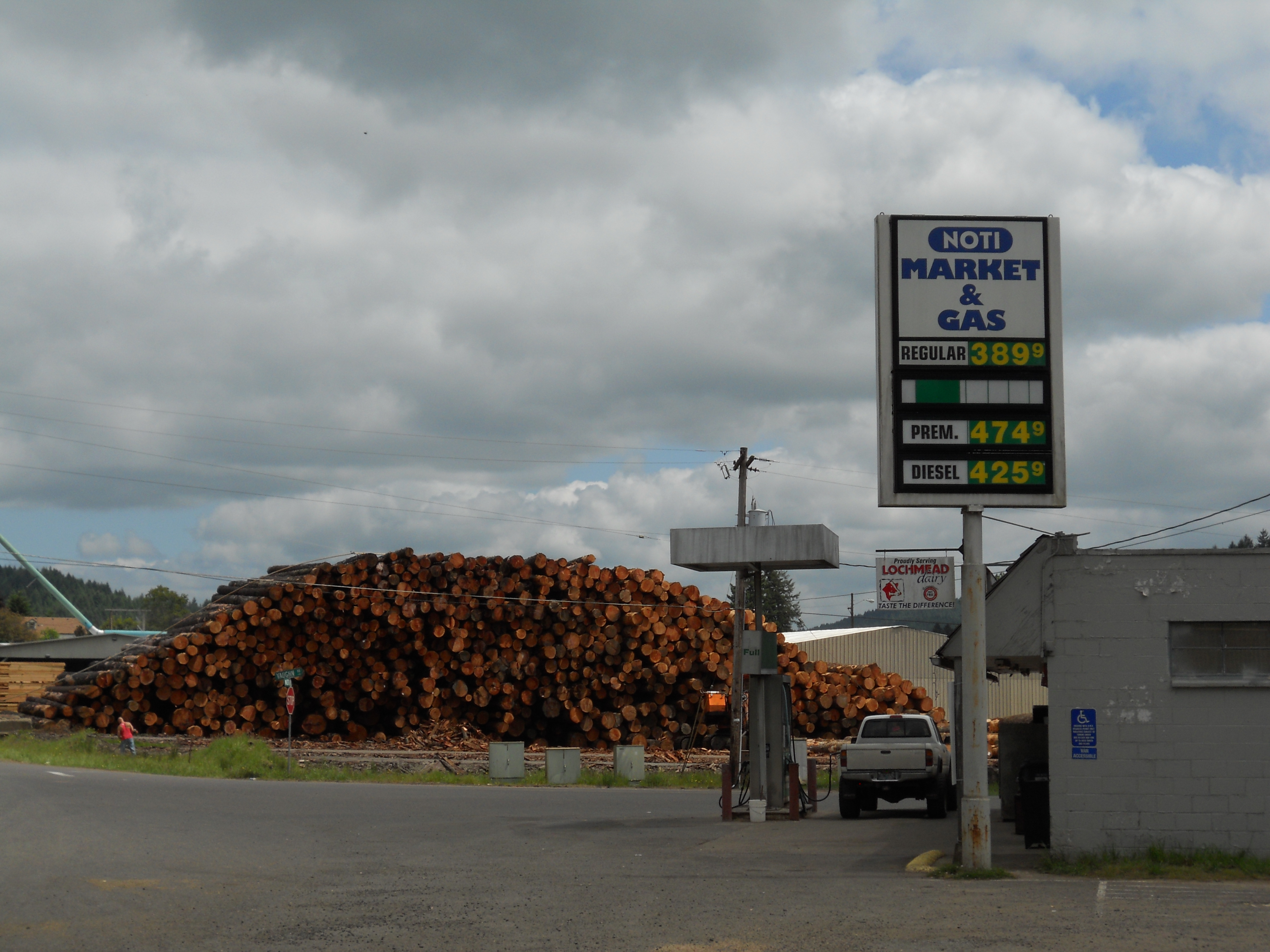
Lumber mill in Noti

== Economy ==
Lumber operations started in 1922 when the Forcia and Larsen Mill was built at Star Camp, west of Noti. That mill burned down in 1946. Two current lumber mills operate in Noti. Swanson Brothers is the older of the two mills. It began operations in 1937. Swanson-Superior Forest Products has operated a small-diameter log mill in Noti since 1973. It is now owned by Seneca Sawmill and known as Seneca Noti.

The Coos Bay Rail Link serves the Swanson-Superior Mill.
