= List of cities in Oregon =

Map of the United States with Oregon highlighted

Oregon is a state in the Pacific Northwest region of the Western United States. As of the 2020 U.S. census, it is the 27th-most populous state, with 4,237,256 inhabitants, and ranked 10th by land area, spanning 95,988 square miles (248,610 km^{2}) of land. Oregon is divided into 36 counties and contains 241 incorporated cities. Approximately 71 percent of the state's population lives in cities, which also generate 83 percent of economic activity and more than 82 percent of Oregon's jobs.

The most populous municipality in Oregon is Portland with 652,503 residents, and the least populous municipality is Greenhorn with three residents. In 2020, the state had five cities with populations greater than 100,000 residents. Portland is also the largest city by land area, at 133.45 sq mi (345.6 km^{2}), while Barlow is the smallest at 0.05 sq mi (0.13 km^{2}). The oldest city in Oregon is Oregon City, which was incorporated in 1844 by the Provisional Legislature and was the first recognized city west of the Rocky Mountains. The most recent city to incorporate is La Pine, which was formed in 2006. Cities are able to be dissolved through disincorporation or consolidated to form a new city, such as the amalgamation of three cities in 1965 to create Lincoln City.

All cities have an elected council and an executive that differs based on the chosen form of local government. A majority of large cities use the council–manager form, which has an executive city manager who is appointed by the council but is not directly elected. The mayor–council form includes an elected mayor that serves as the chief executive. Until its change to a mayor–council system in 2025, Portland used the commission form of government in which elected members of the city commission were also appointed by the mayor to lead city departments. Cities are generally responsible for providing emergency services, land use planning, maintenance of streets, water and waste treatment utilities, and other social services. Revenue for these municipal services is primarily derived from property taxes, followed by fees, hotel taxes, and some funding that is shared with the state government.

== List of incorporated cities ==
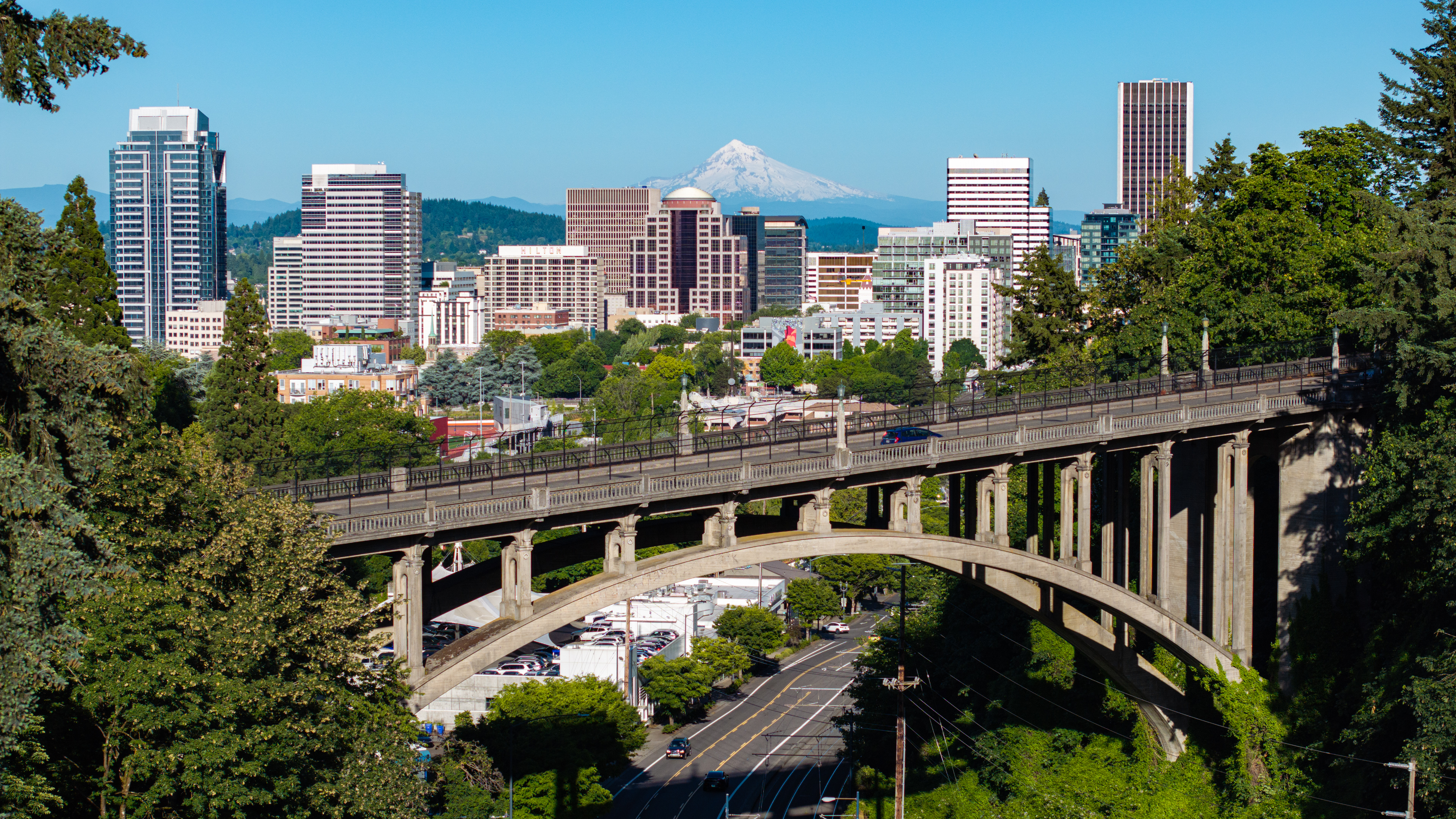
Downtown skyline of Portland, the most populous city in Oregon

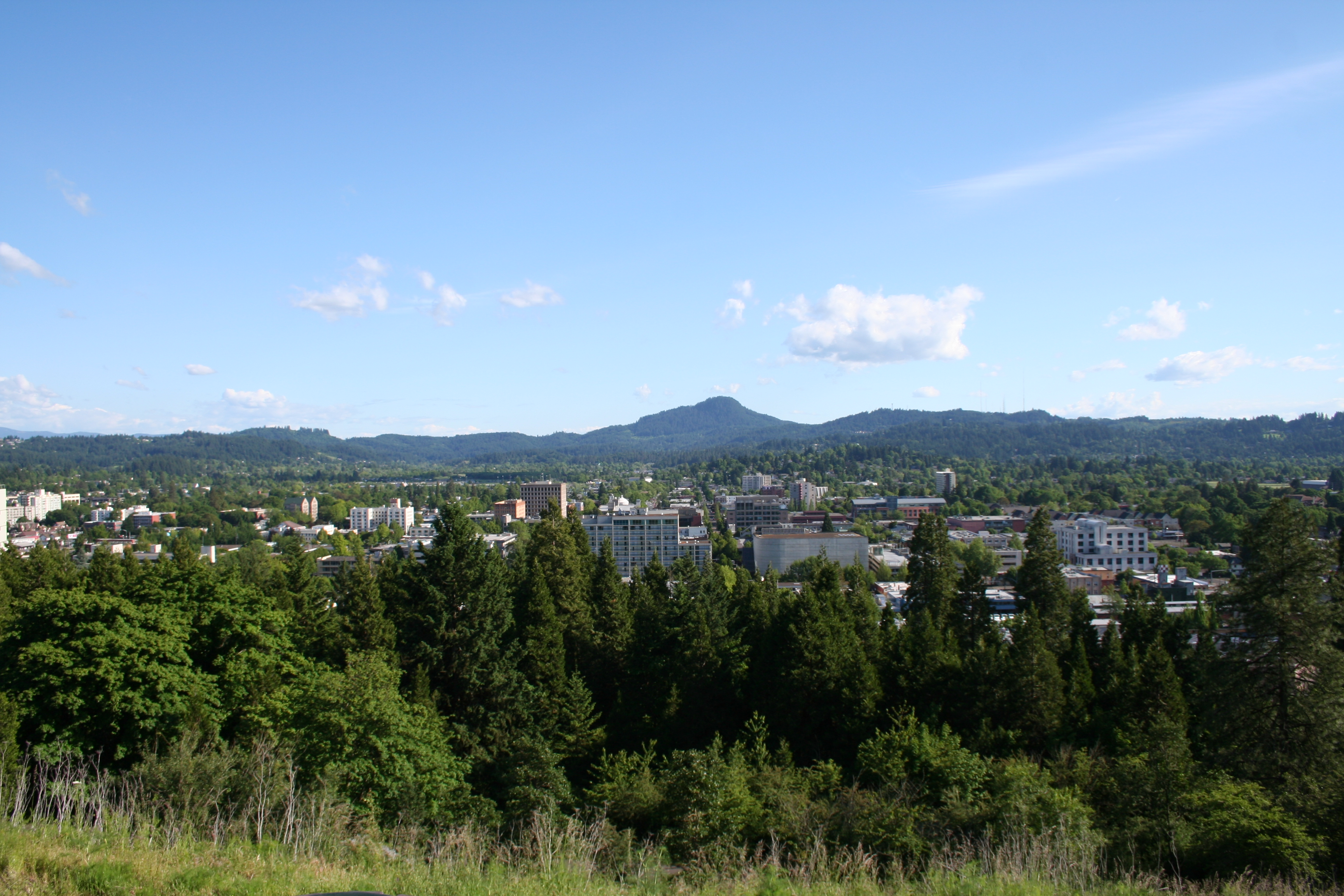
Eugene, the second-most populous city in Oregon

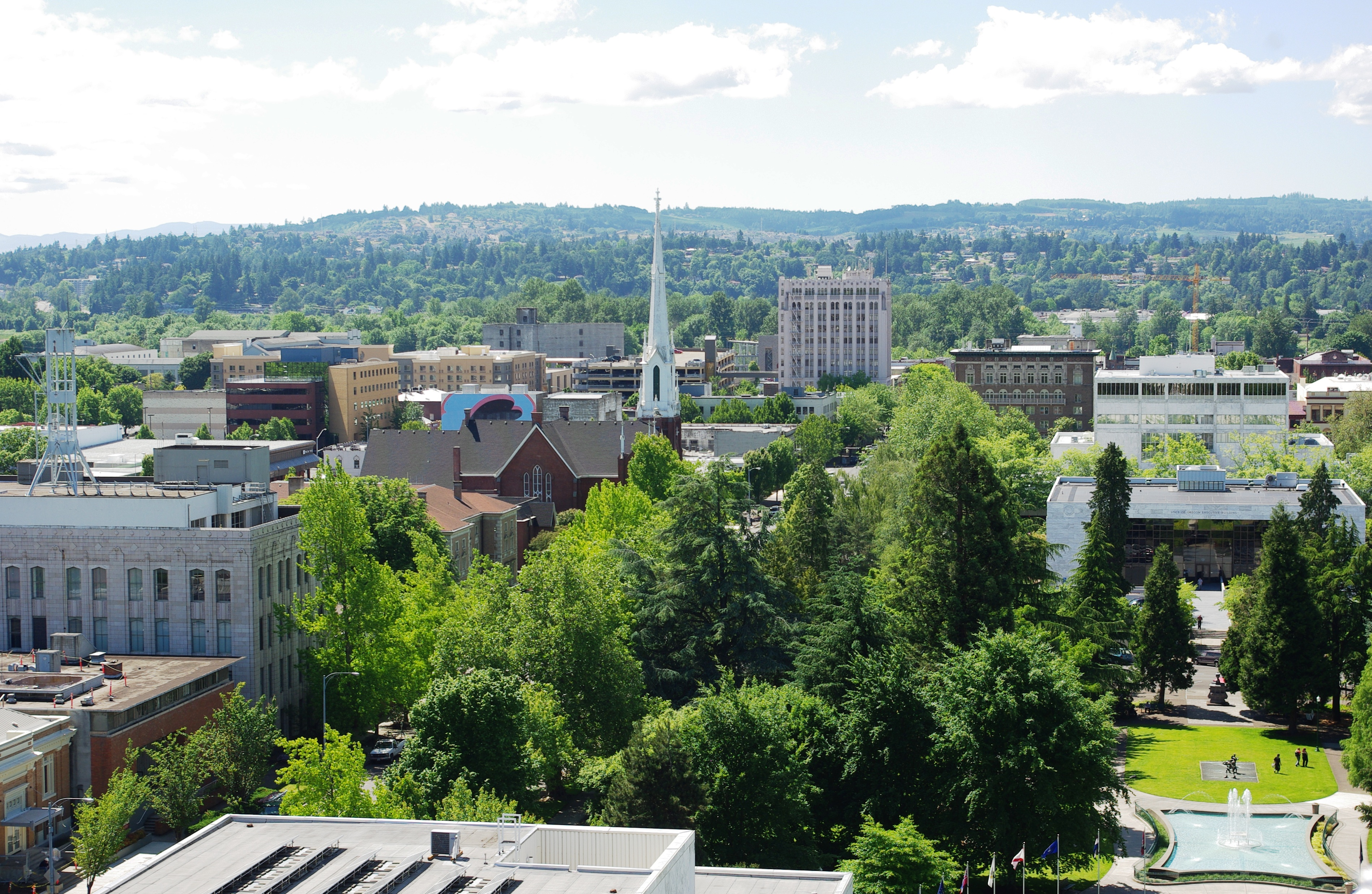
Salem, the third-most populous city in Oregon and the state's capital

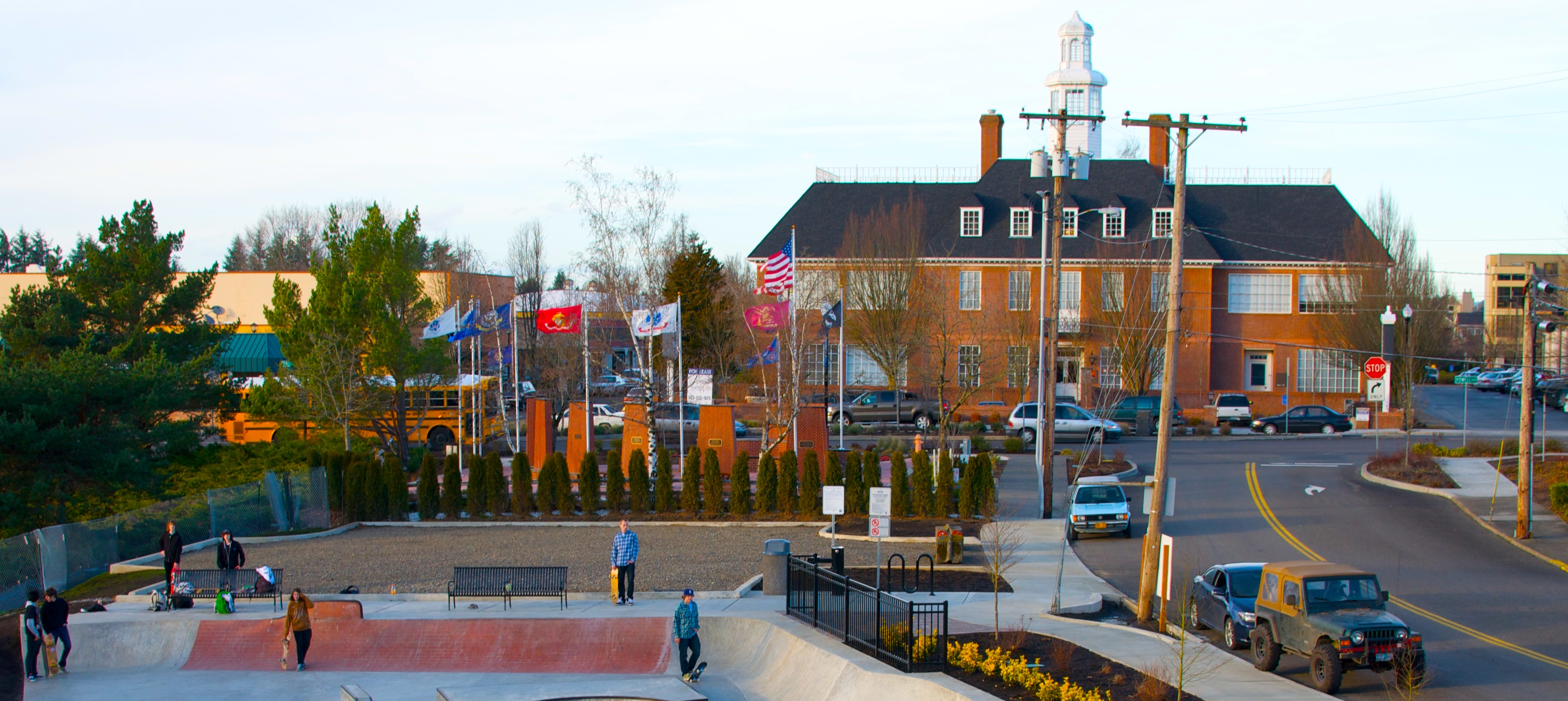
Gresham, the fourth-most populous city in Oregon

Key Symbols indicating county seats and the state capital
†	County seat
‡	State capital and county seat

List of cities in Oregon
Name	County (Note: If a municipality spans multiple counties, the counties are listed in the order given by the Geographic Names Information System (GNIS) with the primary county first.)	Population		Change, 2010–2020	Land area		Population density	Incorporated
Name	County	2020 census	2010 census	Change, 2010–2020	sq mi	km^{2}	Population density	Incorporated
Adair Village	Benton	994	840	+18.33%	0.44	1.1	2,259.1/sq mi (872.2/km^{2})	1976
Adams	Umatilla	389	350	+11.14%	0.36	0.93	1,080.6/sq mi (417.2/km^{2})	1893
Adrian	Malheur	157	177	−11.30%	0.24	0.62	654.2/sq mi (252.6/km^{2})	1972
Albany †	Linn, Benton	56,472	50,158	+12.59%	17.66	45.7	3,197.7/sq mi (1,234.7/km^{2})	1864
Amity	Yamhill	1,757	1,614	+8.86%	0.59	1.5	2,978.0/sq mi (1,149.8/km^{2})	1880
Antelope	Wasco	37	46	−19.57%	0.46	1.2	80.4/sq mi (31.1/km^{2})	1901
Arlington	Gilliam	628	586	+7.17%	2.55	6.6	246.3/sq mi (95.1/km^{2})	1885
Ashland	Jackson	21,360	20,078	+6.39%	6.64	17.2	3,216.9/sq mi (1,242.0/km^{2})	1874
Astoria †	Clatsop	10,181	9,477	+7.43%	6.14	15.9	1,658.1/sq mi (640.2/km^{2})	1856
Athena	Umatilla	1,209	1,126	+7.37%	0.55	1.4	2,198.2/sq mi (848.7/km^{2})	1904
Aumsville	Marion	4,234	3,584	+18.14%	1.13	2.9	3,746.9/sq mi (1,446.7/km^{2})	1911
Aurora	Marion	1,133	918	+23.42%	0.48	1.2	2,360.4/sq mi (911.4/km^{2})	1893
Baker City †	Baker	10,099	9,828	+2.76%	7.16	18.5	1,410.5/sq mi (544.6/km^{2})	1874
Bandon	Coos	3,321	3,066	+8.32%	2.77	7.2	1,198.9/sq mi (462.9/km^{2})	1891
Banks	Washington	1,837	1,777	+3.38%	0.76	2.0	2,417.1/sq mi (933.2/km^{2})	1921
Barlow	Clackamas	133	135	−1.48%	0.05	0.13	2,660.0/sq mi (1,027.0/km^{2})	1903
Bay City	Tillamook	1,389	1,286	+8.01%	1.26	3.3	1,102.4/sq mi (425.6/km^{2})	1910
Beaverton	Washington	97,494	89,803	+8.56%	19.60	50.8	4,974.2/sq mi (1,920.5/km^{2})	1893
Bend †	Deschutes	99,178	76,639	+29.41%	33.62	87.1	2,950.0/sq mi (1,139.0/km^{2})	1905
Boardman	Morrow	3,828	3,220	+18.88%	4.03	10.4	949.9/sq mi (366.7/km^{2})	1927
Bonanza	Klamath	404	415	−2.65%	0.82	2.1	492.7/sq mi (190.2/km^{2})	1901
Brookings	Curry	6,744	6,336	+6.44%	4.15	10.7	1,625.1/sq mi (627.4/km^{2})	1951
Brownsville	Linn	1,694	1,668	+1.56%	1.36	3.5	1,245.6/sq mi (480.9/km^{2})	1876
Burns †	Harney	2,730	2,806	−2.71%	3.55	9.2	769.0/sq mi (296.9/km^{2})	1891
Butte Falls	Jackson	443	423	+4.73%	0.43	1.1	1,030.2/sq mi (397.8/km^{2})	1911
Canby	Clackamas	18,171	15,829	+14.80%	4.69	12.1	3,874.4/sq mi (1,495.9/km^{2})	1893
Cannon Beach	Clatsop	1,489	1,690	−11.89%	1.57	4.1	948.4/sq mi (366.2/km^{2})	1956
Canyon City †	Grant	660	703	−6.12%	1.41	3.7	468.1/sq mi (180.7/km^{2})	1864
Canyonville	Douglas	1,640	1,884	−12.95%	1.06	2.7	1,547.2/sq mi (597.4/km^{2})	1901
Carlton	Yamhill	2,220	2,007	+10.61%	0.88	2.3	2,522.7/sq mi (974.0/km^{2})	1899
Cascade Locks	Hood River	1,379	1,144	+20.54%	2.08	5.4	663.0/sq mi (256.0/km^{2})	1935
Cave Junction	Josephine	2,071	1,883	+9.98%	1.81	4.7	1,144.2/sq mi (441.8/km^{2})	1948
Central Point	Jackson	18,997	17,169	+10.65%	3.93	10.2	4,833.8/sq mi (1,866.4/km^{2})	1889
Chiloquin	Klamath	767	734	+4.50%	0.82	2.1	935.4/sq mi (361.1/km^{2})	1926
Clatskanie	Columbia	1,716	1,737	−1.21%	1.30	3.4	1,320.0/sq mi (509.7/km^{2})	1891
Coburg	Lane	1,306	1,035	+26.18%	1.03	2.7	1,268.0/sq mi (489.6/km^{2})	1893
Columbia City	Columbia	1,949	1,946	+0.15%	0.79	2.0	2,467.1/sq mi (952.5/km^{2})	1926
Condon †	Gilliam	711	682	+4.25%	0.82	2.1	867.1/sq mi (334.8/km^{2})	1893
Coos Bay	Coos	15,985	15,967	+0.11%	10.63	27.5	1,503.8/sq mi (580.6/km^{2})	1874
Coquille †	Coos	4,015	3,866	+3.85%	2.76	7.1	1,454.7/sq mi (561.7/km^{2})	1885
Cornelius	Washington	12,694	11,869	+6.95%	2.34	6.1	5,424.8/sq mi (2,094.5/km^{2})	1893
Corvallis †	Benton	59,922	54,462	+10.03%	14.27	37.0	4,199.2/sq mi (1,621.3/km^{2})	1857
Cottage Grove	Lane	10,574	9,686	+9.17%	3.86	10.0	2,739.4/sq mi (1,057.7/km^{2})	1887
Cove	Union	620	552	+12.32%	0.80	2.1	775.0/sq mi (299.2/km^{2})	1904
Creswell	Lane	5,641	5,031	+12.12%	1.71	4.4	3,298.8/sq mi (1,273.7/km^{2})	1909
Culver	Jefferson	1,602	1,357	+18.05%	0.70	1.8	2,288.6/sq mi (883.6/km^{2})	1946
Dallas †	Polk	16,854	14,583	+15.57%	4.91	12.7	3,432.6/sq mi (1,325.3/km^{2})	1874
Dayton	Yamhill	2,678	2,534	+5.68%	0.84	2.2	3,188.1/sq mi (1,230.9/km^{2})	1880
Dayville	Grant	132	149	−11.41%	0.53	1.4	249.1/sq mi (96.2/km^{2})	1914
Depoe Bay	Lincoln	1,515	1,398	+8.37%	1.81	4.7	837.0/sq mi (323.2/km^{2})	1973
Detroit	Marion	203	202	+0.50%	0.59	1.5	344.1/sq mi (132.8/km^{2})	1952
Donald	Marion	1,009	979	+3.06%	0.28	0.73	3,603.6/sq mi (1,391.3/km^{2})	1912
Drain	Douglas	1,172	1,151	+1.82%	0.63	1.6	1,860.3/sq mi (718.3/km^{2})	1887
Dufur	Wasco	632	604	+4.64%	0.59	1.5	1,071.2/sq mi (413.6/km^{2})	1893
Dundee	Yamhill	3,238	3,162	+2.40%	1.34	3.5	2,416.4/sq mi (933.0/km^{2})	1895
Dunes City	Lane	1,428	1,303	+9.59%	2.69	7.0	530.9/sq mi (205.0/km^{2})	1963
Durham	Washington	1,944	1,351	+43.89%	0.41	1.1	4,741.5/sq mi (1,830.7/km^{2})	1966
Eagle Point	Jackson	9,686	8,469	+14.37%	2.97	7.7	3,261.3/sq mi (1,259.2/km^{2})	1911
Echo	Umatilla	632	699	−9.59%	0.58	1.5	1,089.7/sq mi (420.7/km^{2})	1904
Elgin	Union	1,717	1,711	+0.35%	1.01	2.6	1,700.0/sq mi (656.4/km^{2})	1891
Elkton	Douglas	183	195	−6.15%	0.23	0.60	795.7/sq mi (307.2/km^{2})	1948
Enterprise †	Wallowa	2,052	1,940	+5.77%	1.47	3.8	1,395.9/sq mi (539.0/km^{2})	1889
Estacada	Clackamas	4,356	2,695	+61.63%	2.27	5.9	1,918.9/sq mi (740.9/km^{2})	1905
Eugene †	Lane	176,654	156,185	+13.11%	44.18	114.4	3,998.5/sq mi (1,543.8/km^{2})	1862
Fairview	Multnomah	10,424	8,920	+16.86%	3.09	8.0	3,373.5/sq mi (1,302.5/km^{2})	1908
Falls City	Polk	1,051	947	+10.98%	1.20	3.1	875.8/sq mi (338.2/km^{2})	1893
Florence	Lane	9,396	8,466	+10.99%	5.42	14.0	1,733.6/sq mi (669.3/km^{2})	1893
Forest Grove	Washington	26,225	21,083	+24.39%	5.83	15.1	4,498.3/sq mi (1,736.8/km^{2})	1872
Fossil †	Wheeler	447	473	−5.50%	0.78	2.0	573.1/sq mi (221.3/km^{2})	1891
Garibaldi	Tillamook	830	779	+6.55%	0.99	2.6	838.4/sq mi (323.7/km^{2})	1946
Gaston	Washington, Yamhill	676	637	+6.12%	0.34	0.88	1,988.2/sq mi (767.7/km^{2})	1911
Gates	Marion, Linn	548	471	+16.35%	0.65	1.7	843.1/sq mi (325.5/km^{2})	1950
Gearhart	Clatsop	1,793	1,462	+22.64%	1.85	4.8	969.2/sq mi (374.2/km^{2})	1918
Gervais	Marion	2,595	2,464	+5.32%	0.41	1.1	6,329.3/sq mi (2,443.7/km^{2})	1874
Gladstone	Clackamas	12,017	11,497	+4.52%	2.40	6.2	5,007.1/sq mi (1,933.2/km^{2})	1911
Glendale	Douglas	858	874	−1.83%	0.39	1.0	2,200.0/sq mi (849.4/km^{2})	1901
Gold Beach †	Curry	2,341	2,253	+3.91%	2.53	6.6	925.3/sq mi (357.3/km^{2})	1945
Gold Hill	Jackson	1,335	1,220	+9.43%	0.76	2.0	1,756.6/sq mi (678.2/km^{2})	1895
Granite	Grant	32	38	−15.79%	0.37	0.96	86.5/sq mi (33.4/km^{2})	1901
Grants Pass †	Josephine	39,189	34,533	+13.48%	11.52	29.8	3,401.8/sq mi (1,313.5/km^{2})	1887
Grass Valley	Sherman	149	164	−9.15%	0.51	1.3	292.2/sq mi (112.8/km^{2})	1901
Greenhorn	Baker, Grant	3	0	NA	0.09	0.23	33.3/sq mi (12.9/km^{2})	1903
Gresham	Multnomah	114,247	105,594	+8.19%	23.47	60.8	4,867.8/sq mi (1,879.5/km^{2})	1904
Haines	Baker	373	416	−10.34%	0.76	2.0	490.8/sq mi (189.5/km^{2})	1909
Halfway	Baker	351	288	+21.88%	0.37	0.96	948.6/sq mi (366.3/km^{2})	1909
Halsey	Linn	962	904	+6.42%	0.56	1.5	1,717.9/sq mi (663.3/km^{2})	1876
Happy Valley	Clackamas	23,733	13,903	+70.70%	11.58	30.0	2,049.5/sq mi (791.3/km^{2})	1965
Harrisburg	Linn	3,652	3,567	+2.38%	1.40	3.6	2,608.6/sq mi (1,007.2/km^{2})	1866
Helix	Umatilla	194	184	+5.43%	0.13	0.34	1,492.3/sq mi (576.2/km^{2})	1903
Heppner †	Morrow	1,187	1,291	−8.06%	1.23	3.2	965.0/sq mi (372.6/km^{2})	1887
Hermiston	Umatilla	19,354	16,745	+15.58%	8.28	21.4	2,337.4/sq mi (902.5/km^{2})	1907
Hillsboro †	Washington	106,447	91,611	+16.19%	25.67	66.5	4,146.7/sq mi (1,601.1/km^{2})	1876
Hines	Harney	1,645	1,563	+5.25%	2.06	5.3	798.5/sq mi (308.3/km^{2})	1930
Hood River †	Hood River	8,313	7,167	+15.99%	2.60	6.7	3,197.3/sq mi (1,234.5/km^{2})	1901
Hubbard	Marion	3,426	3,173	+7.97%	0.71	1.8	4,825.4/sq mi (1,863.1/km^{2})	1891
Huntington	Baker	502	440	+14.09%	0.74	1.9	678.4/sq mi (261.9/km^{2})	1891
Idanha	Marion, Linn	156	134	+16.42%	0.74	1.9	210.8/sq mi (81.4/km^{2})	1949
Imbler	Union	245	306	−19.93%	0.22	0.57	1,113.6/sq mi (430.0/km^{2})	1922
Independence	Polk	9,828	8,590	+14.41%	2.98	7.7	3,298.0/sq mi (1,273.4/km^{2})	1874
Ione	Morrow	337	329	+2.43%	0.76	2.0	443.4/sq mi (171.2/km^{2})	1903
Irrigon	Morrow	2,011	1,826	+10.13%	1.30	3.4	1,546.9/sq mi (597.3/km^{2})	1957
Island City	Union	1,144	989	+15.67%	0.98	2.5	1,167.3/sq mi (450.7/km^{2})	1904
Jacksonville	Jackson	3,020	2,785	+8.44%	1.89	4.9	1,597.9/sq mi (616.9/km^{2})	1860
Jefferson	Marion	3,327	3,098	+7.39%	0.86	2.2	3,868.6/sq mi (1,493.7/km^{2})	1870
John Day	Grant	1,664	1,744	−4.59%	2.26	5.9	736.3/sq mi (284.3/km^{2})	1901
Johnson City	Clackamas	539	566	−4.77%	0.07	0.18	7,700.0/sq mi (2,973.0/km^{2})	1970
Jordan Valley	Malheur	130	181	−28.18%	2.08	5.4	62.5/sq mi (24.1/km^{2})	1911
Joseph	Wallowa	1,154	1,081	+6.75%	0.91	2.4	1,268.1/sq mi (489.6/km^{2})	1887
Junction City	Lane	6,787	5,392	+25.87%	3.29	8.5	2,062.9/sq mi (796.5/km^{2})	1872
Keizer	Marion	39,376	36,478	+7.94%	7.19	18.6	5,476.5/sq mi (2,114.5/km^{2})	1983
King City	Washington	5,184	3,111	+66.63%	0.81	2.1	6,400.0/sq mi (2,471.1/km^{2})	1966
Klamath Falls †	Klamath	21,813	20,840	+4.67%	20.14	52.2	1,083.1/sq mi (418.2/km^{2})	1893
La Grande †	Union	13,026	13,082	−0.43%	4.58	11.9	2,844.1/sq mi (1,098.1/km^{2})	1865
La Pine	Deschutes	2,512	1,653	+51.97%	7.14	18.5	351.8/sq mi (135.8/km^{2})	2006
Lafayette	Yamhill	4,423	3,742	+18.20%	0.86	2.2	5,143.0/sq mi (1,985.7/km^{2})	1878
Lake Oswego	Clackamas, Multnomah, Washington	40,732	36,619	+11.23%	10.78	27.9	3,778.5/sq mi (1,458.9/km^{2})	1910
Lakeside	Coos	1,904	1,699	+12.07%	2.00	5.2	952.0/sq mi (367.6/km^{2})	1974
Lakeview †	Lake	2,418	2,294	+5.41%	2.43	6.3	995.1/sq mi (384.2/km^{2})	1889
Lebanon	Linn	18,447	15,518	+18.87%	7.01	18.2	2,631.5/sq mi (1,016.0/km^{2})	1878
Lexington	Morrow	238	238	0.00%	0.44	1.1	540.9/sq mi (208.8/km^{2})	1903
Lincoln City	Lincoln	9,815	7,930	+23.77%	6.05	15.7	1,622.3/sq mi (626.4/km^{2})	1965
Lonerock	Gilliam	25	21	+19.05%	1.01	2.6	24.8/sq mi (9.6/km^{2})	1901
Long Creek	Grant	173	197	−12.18%	1.02	2.6	169.6/sq mi (65.5/km^{2})	1891
Lostine	Wallowa	241	213	+13.15%	0.29	0.75	831.0/sq mi (320.9/km^{2})	1903
Lowell	Lane	1,196	1,045	+14.45%	0.87	2.3	1,374.7/sq mi (530.8/km^{2})	1954
Lyons	Linn	1,202	1,161	+3.53%	0.87	2.3	1,381.6/sq mi (533.4/km^{2})	1958
Madras †	Jefferson	7,456	6,046	+23.32%	8.16	21.1	913.7/sq mi (352.8/km^{2})	1910
Malin	Klamath	731	805	−9.19%	0.50	1.3	1,462.0/sq mi (564.5/km^{2})	1922
Manzanita	Tillamook	603	598	+0.84%	0.82	2.1	735.4/sq mi (283.9/km^{2})	1946
Maupin	Wasco	427	418	+2.15%	1.40	3.6	305.0/sq mi (117.8/km^{2})	1922
Maywood Park	Multnomah	829	752	+10.24%	0.17	0.44	4,876.5/sq mi (1,882.8/km^{2})	1967
McMinnville †	Yamhill	34,319	32,187	+6.62%	10.58	27.4	3,243.8/sq mi (1,252.4/km^{2})	1876
Medford †	Jackson	85,824	74,907	+14.57%	25.89	67.1	3,314.9/sq mi (1,279.9/km^{2})	1885
Merrill	Klamath	821	844	−2.73%	0.46	1.2	1,784.8/sq mi (689.1/km^{2})	1903
Metolius	Jefferson	978	710	+37.75%	0.48	1.2	2,037.5/sq mi (786.7/km^{2})	1913
Mill City	Marion, Linn	1,971	1,855	+6.25%	0.86	2.2	2,291.9/sq mi (884.9/km^{2})	1947
Millersburg	Linn	2,919	1,329	+119.64%	4.46	11.6	654.5/sq mi (252.7/km^{2})	1974
Milton-Freewater	Umatilla	7,151	7,050	+1.43%	2.03	5.3	3,522.7/sq mi (1,360.1/km^{2})	1950
Milwaukie	Clackamas, Multnomah	21,119	20,291	+4.08%	4.98	12.9	4,240.8/sq mi (1,637.4/km^{2})	1903
Mitchell	Wheeler	138	130	+6.15%	1.28	3.3	107.8/sq mi (41.6/km^{2})	1891
Molalla	Clackamas	10,228	8,108	+26.15%	2.42	6.3	4,226.4/sq mi (1,631.8/km^{2})	1913
Monmouth	Polk	11,100	9,534	+16.43%	2.17	5.6	5,115.2/sq mi (1,975.0/km^{2})	1859
Monroe	Benton	647	617	+4.86%	0.51	1.3	1,268.6/sq mi (489.8/km^{2})	1914
Monument	Grant	115	128	−10.16%	0.51	1.3	225.5/sq mi (87.1/km^{2})	1905
Moro †	Sherman	367	324	+13.27%	0.50	1.3	734.0/sq mi (283.4/km^{2})	1899
Mosier	Wasco	468	433	+8.08%	0.46	1.2	1,017.4/sq mi (392.8/km^{2})	1914
Mount Vernon	Grant	548	527	+3.98%	0.68	1.8	805.9/sq mi (311.2/km^{2})	1948
Mt. Angel	Marion	3,392	3,286	+3.23%	1.14	3.0	2,975.4/sq mi (1,148.8/km^{2})	1893
Myrtle Creek	Douglas	3,481	3,439	+1.22%	2.50	6.5	1,392.4/sq mi (537.6/km^{2})	1893
Myrtle Point	Coos	2,475	2,514	−1.55%	1.61	4.2	1,537.3/sq mi (593.5/km^{2})	1887
Nehalem	Tillamook	270	271	−0.37%	0.27	0.70	1,000.0/sq mi (386.1/km^{2})	1899
Newberg	Yamhill	25,138	22,068	+13.91%	5.91	15.3	4,253.5/sq mi (1,642.3/km^{2})	1889
Newport †	Lincoln	10,256	9,989	+2.67%	9.98	25.8	1,027.7/sq mi (396.8/km^{2})	1882
North Bend	Coos	10,317	9,695	+6.42%	3.93	10.2	2,625.2/sq mi (1,013.6/km^{2})	1903
North Plains	Washington	3,441	1,947	+76.73%	1.09	2.8	3,156.9/sq mi (1,218.9/km^{2})	1963
North Powder	Union	504	439	+14.81%	0.63	1.6	800.0/sq mi (308.9/km^{2})	1903
Nyssa	Malheur	3,198	3,267	−2.11%	1.55	4.0	2,063.2/sq mi (796.6/km^{2})	1903
Oakland	Douglas	934	927	+0.76%	0.73	1.9	1,279.5/sq mi (494.0/km^{2})	1878
Oakridge	Lane	3,206	3,205	+0.03%	2.16	5.6	1,484.3/sq mi (573.1/km^{2})	1935
Ontario	Malheur	11,645	11,366	+2.45%	5.17	13.4	2,252.4/sq mi (869.7/km^{2})	1899
Oregon City †	Clackamas	37,572	31,859	+17.93%	10.05	26.0	3,738.5/sq mi (1,443.4/km^{2})	1844
Paisley	Lake	250	243	+2.88%	0.43	1.1	581.4/sq mi (224.5/km^{2})	1911
Pendleton †	Umatilla	17,107	16,612	+2.98%	11.44	29.6	1,495.4/sq mi (577.4/km^{2})	1880
Philomath	Benton	5,350	4,584	+16.71%	2.02	5.2	2,648.5/sq mi (1,022.6/km^{2})	1882
Phoenix	Jackson	4,475	4,538	−1.39%	1.43	3.7	3,129.4/sq mi (1,208.3/km^{2})	1910
Pilot Rock	Umatilla	1,328	1,502	−11.58%	1.45	3.8	915.9/sq mi (353.6/km^{2})	1911
Port Orford	Curry	1,146	1,133	+1.15%	1.56	4.0	734.6/sq mi (283.6/km^{2})	1935
Portland †	Multnomah, Washington, Clackamas	652,503	583,776	+11.77%	133.45	345.6	4,889.5/sq mi (1,887.8/km^{2})	1851
Powers	Coos	710	689	+3.05%	0.58	1.5	1,224.1/sq mi (472.6/km^{2})	1945
Prairie City	Grant	841	909	−7.48%	0.99	2.6	849.5/sq mi (328.0/km^{2})	1891
Prescott	Columbia	82	55	+49.09%	0.07	0.18	1,171.4/sq mi (452.3/km^{2})	1947
Prineville †	Crook	10,736	9,253	+16.03%	12.83	33.2	836.8/sq mi (323.1/km^{2})	1880
Rainier	Columbia	1,911	1,895	+0.84%	4.08	10.6	468.4/sq mi (180.8/km^{2})	1885
Redmond	Deschutes	33,274	26,215	+26.93%	18.26	47.3	1,822.2/sq mi (703.6/km^{2})	1910
Reedsport	Douglas	4,310	4,154	+3.76%	2.07	5.4	2,082.1/sq mi (803.9/km^{2})	1919
Richland	Baker	165	156	+5.77%	0.11	0.28	1,500.0/sq mi (579.2/km^{2})	1917
Riddle	Douglas	1,214	1,185	+2.45%	0.64	1.7	1,896.9/sq mi (732.4/km^{2})	1893
Rivergrove	Clackamas, Washington	545	289	+88.58%	0.17	0.44	3,205.9/sq mi (1,237.8/km^{2})	1971
Rockaway Beach	Tillamook	1,441	1,312	+9.83%	1.60	4.1	900.6/sq mi (347.7/km^{2})	1942
Rogue River	Jackson	2,407	2,131	+12.95%	0.97	2.5	2,481.4/sq mi (958.1/km^{2})	1912
Roseburg †	Douglas	23,683	21,181	+11.81%	10.72	27.8	2,209.2/sq mi (853.0/km^{2})	1868
Rufus	Sherman	268	249	+7.63%	1.18	3.1	227.1/sq mi (87.7/km^{2})	1965
Salem ‡	Marion, Polk	175,535	154,637	+13.51%	48.80	126.4	3,597.0/sq mi (1,388.8/km^{2})	1857
Sandy	Clackamas	12,612	9,570	+31.79%	3.57	9.2	3,532.8/sq mi (1,364.0/km^{2})	1911
Scappoose	Columbia	8,010	6,592	+21.51%	3.43	8.9	2,335.3/sq mi (901.7/km^{2})	1921
Scio	Linn	956	838	+14.08%	0.41	1.1	2,331.7/sq mi (900.3/km^{2})	1866
Scotts Mills	Marion	419	357	+17.37%	0.36	0.93	1,163.9/sq mi (449.4/km^{2})	1916
Seaside	Clatsop	7,115	6,457	+10.19%	3.89	10.1	1,829.0/sq mi (706.2/km^{2})	1899
Seneca	Grant	165	199	−17.09%	0.80	2.1	206.3/sq mi (79.6/km^{2})	1970
Shady Cove	Jackson	3,081	2,904	+6.10%	1.95	5.1	1,580.0/sq mi (610.0/km^{2})	1972
Shaniko	Wasco	30	36	−16.67%	0.50	1.3	60.0/sq mi (23.2/km^{2})	1901
Sheridan	Yamhill	6,233	6,127	+1.73%	2.10	5.4	2,968.1/sq mi (1,146.0/km^{2})	1880
Sherwood	Washington	20,450	18,194	+12.40%	4.83	12.5	4,234.0/sq mi (1,634.7/km^{2})	1893
Siletz	Lincoln	1,230	1,212	+1.49%	0.63	1.6	1,952.4/sq mi (753.8/km^{2})	1946
Silverton	Marion	10,484	9,222	+13.68%	3.51	9.1	2,986.9/sq mi (1,153.2/km^{2})	1885
Sisters	Deschutes	3,064	2,038	+50.34%	1.93	5.0	1,587.6/sq mi (613.0/km^{2})	1946
Sodaville	Linn	360	308	+16.88%	0.31	0.80	1,161.3/sq mi (448.4/km^{2})	1880
Spray	Wheeler	139	160	−13.12%	0.29	0.75	479.3/sq mi (185.1/km^{2})	1958
Springfield	Lane	61,851	59,403	+4.12%	15.85	41.1	3,902.3/sq mi (1,506.7/km^{2})	1885
St. Helens †	Columbia	13,817	12,883	+7.25%	4.82	12.5	2,866.6/sq mi (1,106.8/km^{2})	1889
St. Paul	Marion	434	421	+3.09%	0.29	0.75	1,496.6/sq mi (577.8/km^{2})	1901
Stanfield	Umatilla	2,144	2,043	+4.94%	1.51	3.9	1,419.9/sq mi (548.2/km^{2})	1910
Stayton	Marion	8,244	7,644	+7.85%	3.08	8.0	2,676.6/sq mi (1,033.5/km^{2})	1901
Sublimity	Marion	2,967	2,681	+10.67%	0.94	2.4	3,156.4/sq mi (1,218.7/km^{2})	1903
Summerville	Union	119	135	−11.85%	0.26	0.67	457.7/sq mi (176.7/km^{2})	1885
Sumpter	Baker	204	204	0.00%	2.18	5.6	93.6/sq mi (36.1/km^{2})	1901
Sutherlin	Douglas	8,524	7,810	+9.14%	6.47	16.8	1,317.5/sq mi (508.7/km^{2})	1911
Sweet Home	Linn	9,828	8,925	+10.12%	5.30	13.7	1,854.3/sq mi (716.0/km^{2})	1893
Talent	Jackson	6,282	6,066	+3.56%	1.33	3.4	4,723.3/sq mi (1,823.7/km^{2})	1910
Tangent	Linn	1,231	1,164	+5.76%	3.78	9.8	325.7/sq mi (125.7/km^{2})	1893
The Dalles †	Wasco	16,010	13,620	+17.55%	6.66	17.2	2,403.9/sq mi (928.2/km^{2})	1857
Tigard	Washington	54,539	48,035	+13.54%	12.67	32.8	4,304.6/sq mi (1,662.0/km^{2})	1961
Tillamook †	Tillamook	5,204	4,935	+5.45%	1.90	4.9	2,738.9/sq mi (1,057.5/km^{2})	1891
Toledo	Lincoln	3,546	3,465	+2.34%	2.15	5.6	1,649.3/sq mi (636.8/km^{2})	1905
Troutdale	Multnomah	16,300	15,962	+2.12%	5.95	15.4	2,739.5/sq mi (1,057.7/km^{2})	1907
Tualatin	Washington, Clackamas	27,942	26,054	+7.25%	8.28	21.4	3,374.6/sq mi (1,303.0/km^{2})	1913
Turner	Marion	2,454	1,854	+32.36%	1.43	3.7	1,716.1/sq mi (662.6/km^{2})	1905
Ukiah	Umatilla	159	186	−14.52%	0.24	0.62	662.5/sq mi (255.8/km^{2})	1969
Umatilla	Umatilla	7,363	6,906	+6.62%	4.91	12.7	1,499.6/sq mi (579.0/km^{2})	1864
Union	Union	2,152	2,121	+1.46%	2.49	6.4	864.3/sq mi (333.7/km^{2})	1878
Unity	Baker	40	71	−43.66%	0.64	1.7	62.5/sq mi (24.1/km^{2})	1972
Vale †	Malheur	1,894	1,874	+1.07%	1.14	3.0	1,661.4/sq mi (641.5/km^{2})	1889
Veneta	Lane	5,214	4,561	+14.32%	2.57	6.7	2,028.8/sq mi (783.3/km^{2})	1962
Vernonia	Columbia	2,374	2,151	+10.37%	1.64	4.2	1,447.6/sq mi (558.9/km^{2})	1891
Waldport	Lincoln	2,249	2,033	+10.62%	2.72	7.0	826.8/sq mi (319.2/km^{2})	1911
Wallowa	Wallowa	796	808	−1.49%	0.61	1.6	1,304.9/sq mi (503.8/km^{2})	1899
Warrenton	Clatsop	6,277	4,989	+25.82%	12.66	32.8	495.8/sq mi (191.4/km^{2})	1899
Wasco	Sherman	417	410	+1.71%	1.01	2.6	412.9/sq mi (159.4/km^{2})	1901
Waterloo	Linn	222	229	−3.06%	0.12	0.31	1,850.0/sq mi (714.3/km^{2})	1893
West Linn	Clackamas	27,373	25,109	+9.02%	7.43	19.2	3,684.1/sq mi (1,422.4/km^{2})	1913
Westfir	Lane	259	253	+2.37%	0.31	0.80	835.5/sq mi (322.6/km^{2})	1979
Weston	Umatilla	706	667	+5.85%	0.68	1.8	1,038.2/sq mi (400.9/km^{2})	1878
Wheeler	Tillamook	422	414	+1.93%	0.52	1.3	811.5/sq mi (313.3/km^{2})	1914
Willamina	Yamhill, Polk	2,239	2,025	+10.57%	0.94	2.4	2,381.9/sq mi (919.7/km^{2})	1903
Wilsonville	Clackamas, Washington	26,664	19,509	+36.68%	7.51	19.5	3,550.5/sq mi (1,370.8/km^{2})	1969
Winston	Douglas	5,625	5,379	+4.57%	2.76	7.1	2,038.0/sq mi (786.9/km^{2})	1953
Wood Village	Multnomah	4,387	3,878	+13.13%	0.94	2.4	4,667.0/sq mi (1,801.9/km^{2})	1951
Woodburn	Marion	26,013	24,080	+8.03%	5.86	15.2	4,439.1/sq mi (1,713.9/km^{2})	1889
Yachats	Lincoln	994	690	+44.06%	0.91	2.4	1,092.3/sq mi (421.7/km^{2})	1967
Yamhill	Yamhill	1,147	1,024	+12.01%	0.49	1.3	2,340.8/sq mi (903.8/km^{2})	1891
Yoncalla	Douglas	1,021	1,047	−2.48%	0.67	1.7	1,523.9/sq mi (588.4/km^{2})	1901

== Former cities ==
List of former cities in Oregon
Name	County	Incorporated	Disincorporated	Notes	Ref.
Albina	Multnomah	1887	1891	Annexed into Portland	
Auburn	Baker	1862	1870	Boomtown during the Auburn gold rush; declined after the county seat was moved to Baker City	
Bayocean	Tillamook	1906	1953	Planned seaside resort, later abandoned as coastal erosion destroyed much of the community	
Beaver Hill	Coos	1896	1926	Abandoned after the closure of the Beaver Hill coal mine	
Boyd	Wasco	1895	1955	Small grain-and-mill settlement that declined after rail and highway realignments; formally disincorporated in 1955	
Canemah	Clackamas	Unknown	1928	Annexed by Oregon City in 1928	
Damascus	Clackamas	2004	2020	Disincorporation approved by voters in 2016, confirmed by Oregon Supreme Court in 2020	
Delake	Lincoln	1949	1965	Consolidated with Oceanlake and Taft to form Lincoln City	
Draperville	Linn	1949	1950	Briefly incorporated and then surrendered its charter within a year. Now in Albany city limits	
East Portland	Multnomah	1870	1891	Annexed into Portland	
Empire	Coos	1853	1965	Consolidated with Coos Bay	
Freewater	Umatilla	1902	1950	Consolidated with Milton to form Milton-Freewater	
Glenada	Lane	1912	1922	Partially abandoned due to encroaching sand dunes	
Hammond	Clatsop	1899	1991	Consolidated into Warrenton	
Juntura	Malheur	1913	1977	Dissolved and returned city charter to county government	
Lemati	Lane	1894	1899	Consolidated into Cottage Grove	
Linnton	Multnomah	1910	1915	Annexed into Portland	
Milton	Umatilla	1886	1950	Consolidated with Freewater to form Milton-Freewater	
Oceanlake	Lincoln	1945	1965	Consolidated with Delake and Taft to form Lincoln City	
Orenco	Washington	1913	1938	Annexed into Hillsboro	
Rajneeshpuram	Wasco	1981	1985	Oregon Supreme Court ruled that Rajneeshpuram’s incorporation was unconstitutional	
Sellwood	Multnomah	1887	1893	Annexed by Portland	
St. Johns	Multnomah	1902	1915	Annexed into Portland	
Taft	Lincoln	1926	1965	Consolidated with Delake and Oceanlake to form Lincoln City	
Vanport	Multnomah	1943	1960	Destroyed in the 1948 flood; never rebuilt	
West Salem	Polk	1913	1949	Annexed into Salem	
Willamette	Clackamas	1908	1916	Annexed into West Linn	

== See also ==
- List of counties in Oregon
- List of cities and unincorporated communities in Oregon
- List of census-designated places in Oregon
- List of ghost towns in Oregon
