= Barnesdale, Oregon =

- Census-designated place
- Location within Oregon Location within the United States
- Coordinates: 45°38′55″N 123°51′16″W
- Country: United States
- State: Oregon
- County: Tillamook

Area
  - Total: 0.75 sq mi (1.93 km^{2})
  - Land: 0.75 sq mi (1.93 km^{2})
  - Water: 0 sq mi (0.00 km^{2})
- Elevation: 184 ft (56 m)

Population (2020)
  - Total: 193
  - Density: 258.9/sq mi (99.96/km^{2})
- Time zone: UTC-8 (Pacific (PST))
  - Summer (DST): UTC-7 (PDT)
- ZIP Code: 97131 (Nehalem)
- Area codes: 503/971
- FIPS code: 41-04125
- GNIS feature ID: 2812894

Barnesdale is an unincorporated community and census-designated place (CDP) in Tillamook County, Oregon, United States. It was first listed as a CDP before the 2020 census.

As of the 2020 census, Barnesdale had a population of 193.

The CDP is in northern Tillamook County, in the valley of Foley Creek, a north-flowing tributary of the Nehalem River. Miami-Foley Road is the main road through the community, leading north for 5 miles (8 km) to Oregon Route 53, from where it is a further 3 miles (5 km) to Nehalem along U.S. Route 101. To the south of Barnesdale, it is 7 miles (11 km) to US-101 between Garibaldi and Hobsonville .

== Demographics ==
Historical population
Census	Pop.	Note	%±
2020	193		—
U.S. Decennial Census

== Education ==
It is in the Neah-Kah-Nie School District 56. The district's comprehensive high school is Neah-Kah-Nie High School.

The county is in the Tillamook Bay Community College district.
