= National Ocean Sciences Bowl =

US high school science competition

NOSB
- National Ocean Sciences Bowl
- Formation: 1998
- Headquarters: Boulder, Colorado
- Program Manager: Melissa Brodeur
- Program Specialist: Nicole Palma
- Website: https://nosb.org/

The National Ocean Sciences Bowl (NOSB) is a national high-school science competition currently hosted by the Center for Ocean Leadership, a University Corporation for Atmospheric Research Community Program beginning 10/3/2022. It follows a quiz-bowl format, with lockout buzzers and extended team challenge questions to test students on their knowledge of oceanography and their team problem-solving abilities. Questions cover the fields of biology, chemistry, geology, geography, social science, technology, and physics. The purpose of the event is to increase knowledge of the ocean among high school students and, ultimately, magnify public understanding of ocean research.

The annual competition was first held in 1998, the International Year of the Ocean. Twenty-five U.S. regions compete in the NOSB, each with its own regional competitions. The regional competitions are coordinated by Regional Coordinators, who are typically affiliated with a university in their region. Each year, approximately 2,000 students from 300 schools across the nation compete for prizes and a trip to the national competition. Students who participate are eligible to apply for the National Ocean Scholar Program.

The NOSB is a creation of oceanographer Rick Spinrad and Admiral James D. Watkins, USN Ret.

== Format and scoring ==
=== Types of questions ===
- Toss-up: These are multiple choice questions that can be answered by any of the 4 active players on either team in play. Teams have 5 seconds to buzz in and answer the question. If the first team's answer is incorrect, the opposing team will get another 5 seconds to answer. The team that buzzes in first gets to answer the question. A correct answer wins the team 4 points and the right to attempt a bonus question. No conferring is allowed on toss-ups. If a player buzzes in before a moderator finishes reading the question, the buzz is called an interrupt. An incorrect answer will cause the team to lose 4 points and the question to be re-read to the opposing team. This is the only situation in which a team can lose points. However, no points are lost for incorrect answers that are not interrupts. If a player begins an answer before being verbally recognized by the moderator, this is called a blurt. The answer is ignored (not indicated as correct or incorrect by the moderator), and the question is re-read to the opposing team. There is no point penalty for a blurt, but the team that blurted is disqualified from answering that question.
- Bonus: These are short answer questions that only the team that correctly answered the previous toss-up may answer. Teams have 20 seconds to confer and answer this question. The team captain must begin the team's answer before time is called. A correct response is awarded with an additional 6 points.
- Team Challenge Question (TCQ): Each Team Challenge Question is a multi-part question worth up to 20 points, with partial credits possible. Time ranges from 2 to 5 minutes for a team challenge question, and the topics can be anything related to oceanography.

A single NOSB match consists of two 6-minute buzzer segments with two Team Challenge Questions in between. Each round is made up of 20 question pairs. After the break, the second half begins with the first toss-up that was not read in the first half and continues until time expires or all questions have been read. The most points a team can earn each round is 240 points (20 toss-ups and bonuses each plus full-credit on the two TCQs), but earning 100 or more points is considered very impressive. Teams may make substitutions only during the break.

With the exception of articles such as "a","an", and "the", answers to toss-up, multiple-choice questions must be exactly as those on the written page. Prefacing answers with phrases such as "My answer is" is not acceptable for toss-up questions.

=== Science Expert Briefing (SEB) ===
The SEB is a mock congressional hearing where students present science recommendations on a piece of legislation, enhancing the critical thinking elements of the competition and focusing on real-world skills. Regional bowl winners must participate in the SEB to be eligible for in-person national finals.

=== Roles of Officials ===
- Moderator: Reads questions and interprets responses by comparing with the answer sheet.
- Science Judge: If the official answer is challenged by a team, the moderator may consult the Science Judge to come to a verdict.
- Rules Judge: Oversees activity in the event room and addresses any issues or misbehavior.
- Scorekeeper: Records the current score of a progressing match, including rewards and penalties. Generally a copy is saved for later reference.
- Timekeeper: Tracks the time throughout the round. In charge of stopping, starting, and resetting the clock. Also notifies teams of time benchmarks (such as 5 seconds left to answer a bonus or 45 and 15 seconds left to answer a Team Challenge Question).
- Runner: Primarily used for retrieving documents, such as the official testing material. Also brings Team Challenge Questions to and from the grading center for official scoring.

== Locations ==
The national competition is held in one of the participating colleges that holds a regional bowl. These colleges draw from high schools in their areas and run the regional competitions, often naming the regional according to the characteristics of the region. For example, the region encompassing Colorado and the surrounding area is called the "Trout Bowl." The annual themes, since 2008, are also listed below.

=== Nationals ===
- 2026 - Competition canceled (Insufficient funding) - Ocean Conservation: Connecting Science and Stewardship for a Healthy Ocean
- 2025 - Virtual - Sounding the Depths: Understanding Ocean Acoustics
- 2023 & 2024 - None took place.
- 2022 - Virtual - Climate Change: Ocean Science and Solutions
- 2021 - Virtual - Plunging into Our Polar Seas
- 2020 - Virtual - Understanding Human, Economic and Environmental Resiliency in the Gulf of Mexico
- 2019 - Washington, DC - Observe the Ocean, Secure the Future
- 2018 - Boulder, Colorado - Our Ocean Shaping Weather
- 2017 - Corvallis, Oregon - Blue Energy: Powering the Planet With Our Ocean
- 2016 - Morehead City, North Carolina - Our Changing Ocean: Science for Strong Coastal Communities
- 2015 - Ocean Springs, Mississippi - The Science of Oil in the Ocean
- 2014 - Seattle, Washington - Ocean Acidification
- 2013 - Milwaukee, Wisconsin - The Great Lakes: A Window into Freshwater Science
- 2012 - Baltimore, Maryland - Sea of Change: Development and Evolution
- 2011 - Galveston, Texas - Human Responses to Ocean Events
- 2010 - St. Petersburg, Florida - Marine Technology
- 2009 - Washington, DC - Biodiversity
- 2008 - Seward, Alaska - International Polar Year
- 2007 - Long Island, New York
- 2006 - Pacific Grove, California
- 2005 - Biloxi, Mississippi
- 2004 - Charleston, South Carolina
- 2003 - La Jolla, California
- 2002 - Providence, Rhode Island
- 2001 - Miami, Florida
- 2000 - Linthicum, Maryland
- 1999 - Washington, DC
- 1998 - Washington, DC

=== Regionals ===
- Aloha Bowl (University of Hawaiʻi at Mānoa)
- Bay Scallop Bowl (People Making a Difference)
- Blue Crab Bowl (Virginia Institute of Marine Science)
- Blue Heron Bowl (University of North Carolina Institute of Marine Sciences and Seahorse Coastal Consulting)
- Blue Lobster Bowl (MIT Department of Earth, Atmospheric & Planetary Sciences and People Making a Difference)
- Chesapeake Bay Bowl (George Mason University)
- The Dolphin Challenge (Texas A&M University - Galveston)
- Garibaldi Bowl (University of San Diego) (formerly Grunion Bowl)
- Great Lakes Bowl (University of Michigan)
- Hurricane Bowl (Gulf Coast Research Laboratory Marine Education Center)
- Lake Sturgeon Bowl (University of Wisconsin–Milwaukee)
- Loggerhead Challenge (University of Texas Marine Science Institute - Port Aransas)
- Los Angeles Surf Bowl (Jet Propulsion Laboratory)
- Manatee Bowl (Florida Atlantic University: Harbor Branch Oceanographic Institute)
- Nor'easter Bowl (University of New England)
- Orca Bowl (University of Washington)
- Penguin Bowl (Pittsburgh Zoo & PPG Aquarium)
- Quahog Bowl (Connecticut Sea Grant & Project Oceanology)
- Salmon Bowl (Oregon State University)
- Sea Lion Bowl (Cal Poly Maritime Academy) (formerly Otter Bowl)
- Shore Bowl (People Making a Difference)
- Southern Stingray Bowl (Savannah State University)
- Sponge Bowl (People Making a Difference)
- Spoonbill Bowl (University of South Florida)
- Trout Bowl (National Renewable Energy Laboratory)
- Tsunami Bowl (University of Alaska-Fairbanks)

== Winners ==
=== Schools With Greatest Number of Wins ===
- 5: Lexington High School (1998-2002)
- 4: Marshfield High School (2009-2012)
- 2: Albany High School (2016, 2019)
- 2: Boise High School (2014-2015)
- 2: Lincoln-Sudbury Regional High School (2006, 2008)
- 2: Cranston High School West (Cranston, Rhode Island) (2003, 2005)
- 1: Thomas Jefferson High School for Science and Technology (2025)
- 1: Canyon Crest Academy (2022)
- 1: Dougherty Valley High School (2021)
- 1: Ladue Horton Watkins High School (2020)
- 1: Montgomery Blair High School (2018)
- 1: Santa Monica High School (2017)
- 1: Arcadia High School (2013)
- 1: Contoocook Valley Regional High School (2007)
- 1: Mission San Jose High School (2004)

=== Top-Placing Teams By Year ===
2025 National Ocean Sciences Bowl - (Resumption of virtual competition, played head-to-head for first time):

1. Thomas Jefferson High School for Science and Technology (David Yan, Krish Bommakanti, Ethan Li, Jack Gao, Marta Anvelt)
2. Midwood High School (Wan Wu, Jackson Scott-Luib, Angelina Maiorov, Wayne Chen, Christian Gabelman)
3. Lynbrook High School (Richard Zheng, Shripriya Kalbhavi, Isaish Sit, Aidan Tung, Thomas Wu)
4. Marshfield High School (Kai Rens, Ean Sautebin, Neel Gonogunta, Cade Dahl, Prisha Varre)
5. Falmouth High School (Tanish Agnihotri, Elias Haller, Harlan Haller, Myles Feuer, Dan Stoivoc)
6. Centerville High School (Tatsuya Kaneko, Brandon Yu, Chris Wang, Arjun Vohra, Arthee Tambi-Pillai)
7. Warwick High School (Gwenyth Conaway, Wayne Riddle, Elmer Sierra-Velasquez, Darwin Roblero-Deleon, Rudolph Vazquez-Lozada)
8. Juneau-Douglas High School (Samuel Lagerquist, Ainsely Mallott, Alexander Rehfeldt, Owen Rumsey, Ryan Song)

Tacoma School of the Arts won the sportsmanship award.

2022 National Ocean Sciences Bowl - (Third year of virtual competition):

1. Canyon Crest Academy
2. Dougherty Valley High School
3. Lexington High School
4. Tesla STEM High School
5. Ladue Horton Watkins High School
6. Midwood High School
7. Santa Monica High School
8. Thomas Jefferson High School for Science and Technology

Thomas Jefferson High School for Science and Technology won the Science Expert Briefing.

2021 National Ocean Sciences Bowl (Second year of virtual competition):

1. Dougherty Valley High School
2. Lexington High School
3. Canyon Crest Academy
4. Santa Monica High School
5. Tesla STEM High School
6. Saline High School
7. Oxford High School
8. E. O. Smith High School

Thomas Jefferson High School for Science and Technology won the Science Expert Briefing.

2020 National Ocean Sciences Bowl (First-ever virtual finals competition):

1. Ladue Horton Watkins High School
2. Santa Monica High School
3. Dougherty Valley High School
4. Centerville High School
5. West Windsor-Plainsboro High School North
6. Newport High School
7. Lexington High School
8. Arkansas School for Mathematics, Sciences, and the Arts

Newport High School won the Science Expert Briefing.

2019 National Ocean Sciences Bowl:

1. Albany High School
2. Santa Monica High School
3. Ladue Horton Watkins High School
4. Centerville High School
5. Marine Academy of Science and Technology
6. Oregon Coast Aquarium
7. Newport High School
8. Science and Technology Magnet High School of Southeastern Connecticut

2018 National Ocean Sciences Bowl:

1. Montgomery Blair High School
2. Santa Monica High School
3. Marshfield High School
4. Albany High School
5. Newport High School
6. Fort Collins High School
7. Princeton High School
8. Mount Sinai High School

2017 National Ocean Sciences Bowl:

1. Santa Monica High School
2. Marshfield High School
3. North Carolina School of Science and Math
4. Centerville High School
5. Bishop Sullivan Catholic High School
6. Eastside High School
7. Liberty Common High School
8. Oxford High School

Kalani High School won the sportsmanship award.

2016 National Ocean Sciences Bowl:

1. Albany High School
2. Marshfield High School
3. Santa Monica High School
4. Liberty Common High School
5. Boise High School
6. Lexington High School
7. E. O. Smith High School
8. Montgomery Blair High School

York High School won the sportsmanship award.

2015 National Ocean Sciences Bowl:

1. Boise High School
2. Dexter High School
3. Marshfield High School
4. Mission San Jose High School
5. Mount Sinai High School
6. Lexington High School
7. Chaparral Star Academy
8. Arcadia High School

Sanger High School won the sportsmanship award.

2014 National Ocean Sciences Bowl:

1. Boise High School
2. Arcadia High School
3. Juneau-Douglas High School
4. Bishop Sullivan Catholic High School
5. Eastside High School
6. Chaparral Star Academy
7. Thomas Jefferson High School for Science and Technology
8. Lexington High School

Langham Creek High School won the sportsmanship award.

2013 National Ocean Sciences Bowl:

1. Arcadia High School
2. Lexington High School
3. Juneau-Douglas High School
4. Neah-Kah-Nie High School
5. Albany High School
6. Greenhills High School
7. Dana Hills High School
8. Maui High School

Annapolis Christian Academy won the sportsmanship award.

Neah-Kah-Nie High School won the Science Experts Briefing.

2012 National Ocean Sciences Bowl:

1. Marshfield High School
2. Raleigh Charter High School
3. Eastside High School
4. Lexington High School
5. Santa Monica High School
6. Maui High School
7. Albany High School
8. Loveland High School

2011 National Ocean Sciences Bowl:

1. Marshfield High School
2. Lexington High School
3. Santa Monica High School
4. Mount Sinai High School
5. Contoocook Valley Regional High School
6. Mission San Jose High School
7. State College High School
8. North Carolina School of Science and Mathematics

2010 National Ocean Sciences Bowl:

1. Marshfield High School
2. Marine Academy of Science and Technology
3. Mission San Jose High School
4. La Jolla High School
5. Punahou School
6. Neah-Kah-Nie High School
7. Thomas Jefferson High School for Science and Technology
8. Arcadia High School
9. Mount Sinai High School

Langham Creek High School won the sportsmanship award.

2009 National Ocean Sciences Bowl:

1. Marshfield High School
2. Lexington High School
3. Cranston High School West
4. Mission San Jose High School
5. Raleigh Charter High School

2008 National Ocean Sciences Bowl:

1. Lincoln-Sudbury Regional High School
2. Mission San Jose High School
3. Santa Monica High School
4. Dexter High School
5. La Jolla High School

Kealakehe High School won the sportsmanship award.

2007 National Ocean Sciences Bowl:

1. Contoocook Valley Regional High School (Peterborough, New Hampshire)
2. Cranston High School West (Cranston, Rhode Island)
3. Lincoln-Sudbury Regional High School (Sudbury, Massachusetts)
4. Santa Monica High School (Santa Monica, CA)
5. Smoky Hill High School (Aurora, CO)
6. Churchville-Chili High School (Churchville, New York)
7. Dexter High School (Dexter, MI)
8. Durant High School (Plant City, FL)

Poplarville High School won the sportsmanship award.

2006 National Ocean Sciences Bowl:

1. Lincoln-Sudbury Regional High School (Sudbury, Massachusetts)
2. Poudre High School (Fort Collins, CO)
3. Santa Monica High School (Santa Monica, CA)
4. Albany High School (Albany, CA)
5. MAST Academy (Miami, FL)
6. Oconee County High School (Oconee County, Georgia)
7. Langham Creek High School (Langham Creek, TX)
8. Thomas Jefferson High School for Science and Technology (Arlington, VA)

2005 National Ocean Sciences Bowl:

1. Cranston High School West (Cranston, Rhode Island)
2. Lincoln-Sudbury Regional High School (Sudbury, Massachusetts)
3. Mission San Jose High School (Fremont, California)
4. Oconee County High School (Oconee County, Georgia)
5. La Jolla High School (La Jolla, California)
6. Maui High School (Maui County, Hawaii)
7. Santa Monica High School (Santa Monica, California)
8. Incarnate Word Academy (Corpus Christi, Texas)

Past National Ocean Sciences Bowl Winners:

- 2004 - Mission San Jose High School (Fremont, California)
- 2003 - Cranston High School West (Cranston, Rhode Island)
- 2002 - Lexington High School, (Lexington, MA)
- 2001 - Lexington High School, (Lexington, MA)
- 2000 - Lexington High School, (Lexington, MA)
- 1999 - Lexington High School, (Lexington, MA)
- 1998 - Lexington High School, (Lexington, MA)

== Prizes ==
The prizes for placing at the national competition vary from year to year. In recent years, the top two teams have received week-long experiential trips while many of the other teams at the national competition have received smaller prizes.

2025

- 1st - 2nd: The choice of trips to Monterey, California or Cambridge, Massachusetts with the national champions choosing first.
- 1st - 4th: Engraved trophies
- 3rd - 4th: Book copies of Deep Water: From the Frilled Shark to the Dumbo Octopus and From the Continental Shelf to the Mariana Trench by Riley Black and From the Seashore to the Seafloor by Janet Voight.
- 5th - 18th: Books on ocean and atmospheric science topics.
- All Teams: Engraved participation plaques and a copy of Megalodons, Mermaids, and Climate Change: Answers to Your Ocean and Atmosphere Questions by Ellen Prager and Dave Jones.
- All Coaches: One-year membership to the National Marine Educators Association (NMEA)

2016

- 1st: Monaco (Courtesy of Prince Albert II of Monaco Foundation)
- 2nd: University of Milwaukee, Wisconsin, School of Freshwater Sciences

2015

- 1st: NOAA Auke Bay Laboratory, Juneau, Alaska, and Sitka Sound Science Center, Sitka, Alaska
- 2nd: University of Texas Marine Science Institute, Port Aransas, Texas, and Harte Research Institute for Gulf of Mexico Studies, Corpus Christi, Texas

2014

- 1st: Shoals Marine Lab, Portsmouth, New Hampshire, University of Maine Darling Marine Center, Walpole, Maine, Bigelow Laboratory for Ocean Sciences, East Boothbay, Maine, and Gulf of Maine Research Institute, Portland, Maine
- 2nd: Smithsonian, Washington DC, NOAA Oxford Laboratory, Oxford, Maryland, Khaled bin Sultan Living Oceans Foundation, Annapolis, Maryland

2013

- 1st: University of Massachusetts Dartmouth, North Dartmouth, Massachusetts, Woods Hole Oceanographic Institution, Falmouth, Massachusetts, University of Rhode Island, South Kingston, Rhode Island, and Connecticut Sea Grant, Groton, Connecticut
- 2nd: University of Georgia Marine Extension Service, Savannah, Georgia, Skidaway Institute of Oceanography, Savannah, Georgia, and Savannah State University, Savannah, Georgia

== See also ==
- Science Bowl
