= Jim Massey (American football) =

American football player (born 1948)

No. 47
- Position: Cornerback

Personal information
- Born: May 24, 1948 (age 78); McMinnville, Oregon, U.S.
- Listed height: 5 ft 11 in (1.80 m)
- Listed weight: 198 lb (90 kg)

Career information
- High school: Neah-Kah-Nie (Rockaway Beach, Oregon)
- College: Linfield
- NFL draft: 1972: 10th round, 251st overall pick

Career history
- Los Angeles Rams (1972)*; New England Patriots (1974–1975)
- * Offseason or practice squad member only
- Stats at Pro Football Reference

James Lee Massey (born May 24, 1948) is an American former professional football player who was a cornerback for the New England Patriots of the National Football League (NFL). He played college football for the Linfield Wildcats.
