= Bayside Gardens, Oregon =

Unincorporated community in the state of Oregon, United States

- Census-designated place (CDP)
- Location within Oregon Location within the United States
- Coordinates: 45°42′52″N 123°54′59″W
- Country: United States
- State: Oregon
- County: Tillamook

Area
  - Total: 0.99 sq mi (2.57 km^{2})
  - Land: 0.99 sq mi (2.57 km^{2})
  - Water: 0 sq mi (0.00 km^{2})
- Elevation: 43 ft (13 m)

Population (2020)
  - Total: 1,214
  - Density: 1,224.6/sq mi (472.81/km^{2})
- Time zone: UTC-8 (Pacific (PST))
  - Summer (DST): UTC-7 (PDT)
- Area code: 503
- FIPS code: 41-04925
- GNIS feature ID: 2611715

Bayside Gardens is an unincorporated community in Tillamook County, Oregon, United States. It lies along Route 101 between Manzanita and Nehalem and borders Nehalem Bay. For statistical purposes, the United States Census Bureau has defined Bayside Gardens as a census-designated place (CDP). The census definition of the area may not precisely correspond to local understanding of the area with the same name. As of the 2020 census, Bayside Gardens had a population of 1,214.

== Demographics ==
Historical population
Census	Pop.	Note	%±
2020	1,214		—
U.S. Decennial Census

== Education ==
It is in the Neah-Kah-Nie School District 56. The district's comprehensive high school is Neah-Kah-Nie High School.

The county is in the Tillamook Bay Community College district.
