= Neah-Kah-Nie High School =

Public school in Rockaway Beach, Oregon, United States

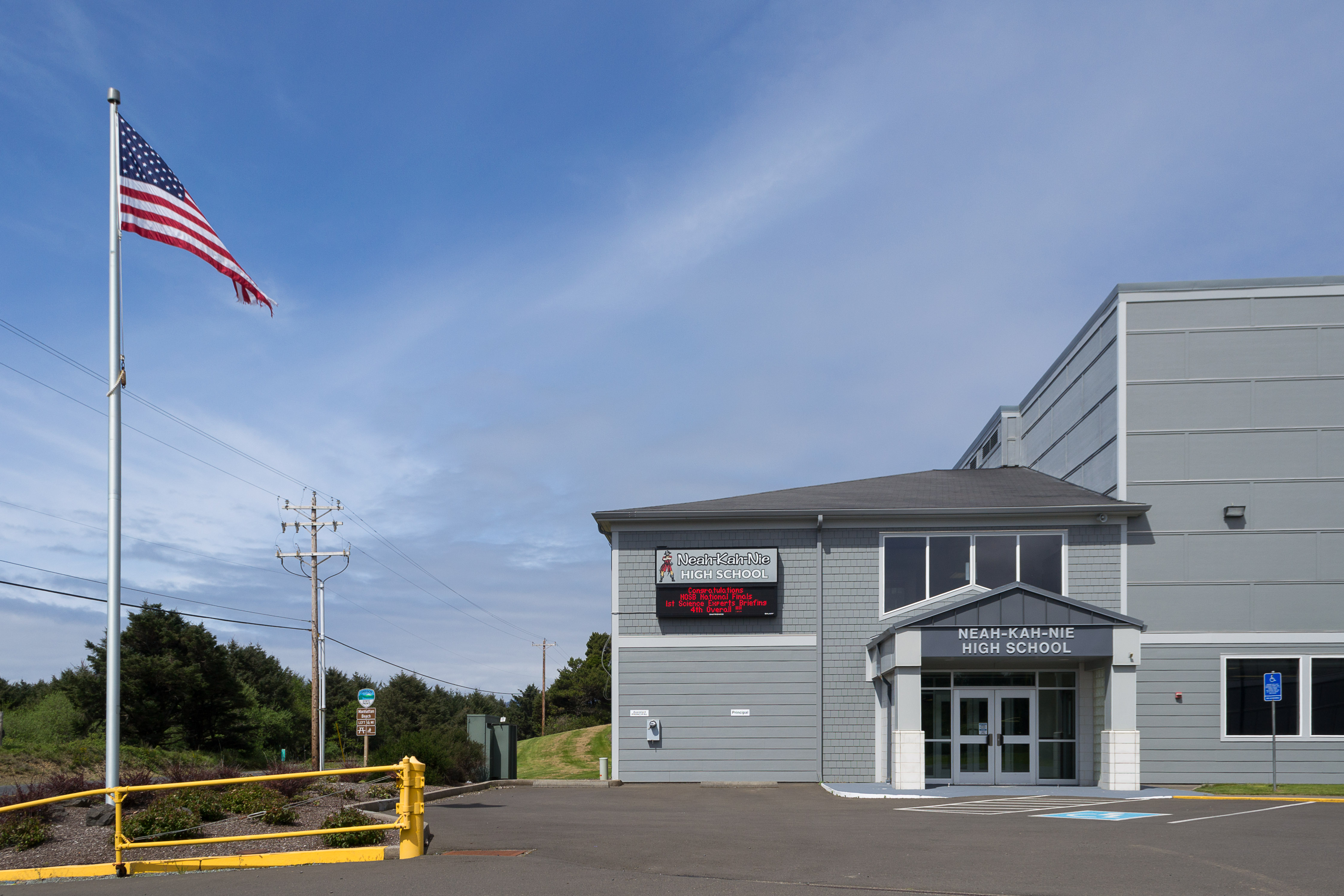

Location
- 24705 Hwy 101 N Rockaway Beach, (Tillamook County), Oregon 97136; United States; 45.638644°N 123.939557°W

Information
- Type: Public
- School district: Neah-Kah-Nie School District
- Principal: Christy Hartford
- Teaching staff: 17.88 (FTE)
- Grades: 9-12
- Enrollment: 244 (2024–2025)
- Student to teacher ratio: 13.65
- Colors: Red and black
- Athletics conference: OSAA 2A-1 Northwest League
- Mascot: Pirate
- Website: http://www.nknsd.org

Neah-Kah-Nie High School is a public high school located in Rockaway Beach, Oregon, United States. It is part of the Neah-Kah-Nie School District. Neahkahnie Mountain is only 12 miles (19 km) north of the school. In 2017 construction on a new track and concession stand was completed.

Neah-Kah-Nie High School is the sole comprehensive high school in the district. The boundary of the school district includes the municipalities of Bay City, Garibaldi, Manzanita, Nehalem, Rockaway Beach, and Wheeler, and the census-designated places of Barnesdale, Bayside Gardens, and Neahkahnie.

== Academics ==
In 2008, 82% of the school's seniors received a high school diploma. Of 60 students, 49 graduated, seven dropped out, and four were still in high school in 2009.

Neah-Kah-Nie High School offers seven Advanced Placement (AP) courses and 17 opportunities for college credit through Tillamook Bay Community College.

== Activities ==
In 2010, the school's team placed sixth at the National Ocean Sciences Bowl, held in St. Petersburg, Florida.

In 2013, the school's team placed first in Science Experts Briefing (SEB) and fourth overall at the National Ocean Sciences Bowl, held in Milwaukee, Wisconsin.

== Notable alumni ==
- Jim Massey — former NFL player
- Kelly Halliburton — Oregon Music Hall Of Fame inductee
