= Neah-Kah-Nie School District =

School district of Tillamook County, Oregon, USA

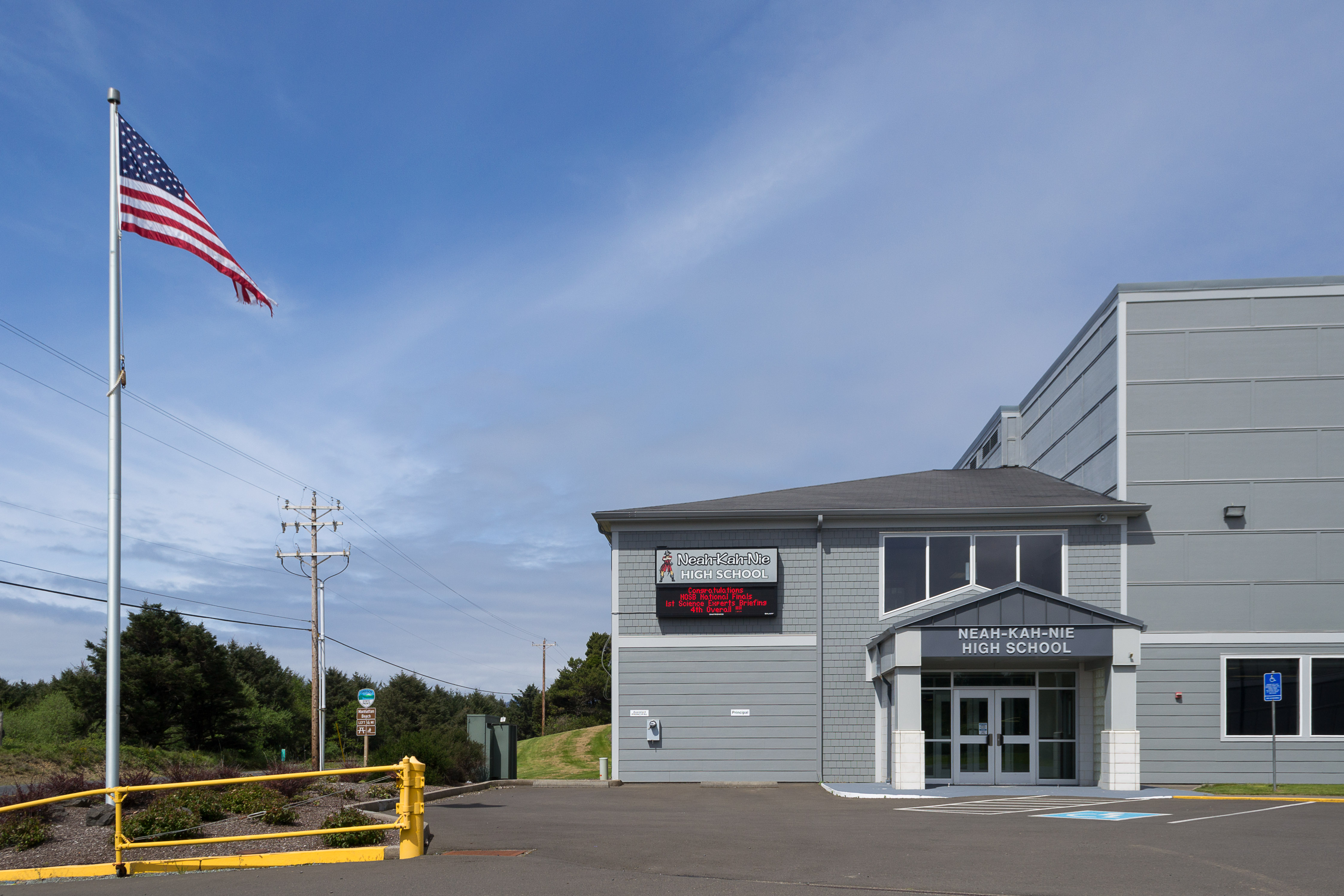
Neah-Kah-Nie High School

The Neah-Kah-Nie School District is located in north Tillamook County, Oregon, United States. There are four schools in the district: Neah-Kah-Nie High School, Neah-Kah-Nie Middle School, Garibaldi Grade School, and Nehalem Elementary School.

It includes the municipalities of Bay City, Garibaldi, Manzanita, Nehalem, Rockaway Beach, and Wheeler, and the census-designated places of Barnesdale, Bayside Gardens, and Neahkahnie.

== Demographics ==
In the 2009 school year, the district had 58 students classified as homeless by the Department of Education, or 8.3% of students in the district.
