= Chaparral Star Academy =

Location
- 14046 Summit Drive; Austin, Texas 78728; United States; 30.437999°N 97.691764°W

Information
- Type: Public high school
- Established: 1998
- Principal: Marsha Hagin
- Grades: K-12
- Enrollment: 360 (2023-2024)
- Team name: Sharks
- Website: Official Website

Chaparral Star Academy is a public charter school in Austin, Texas. It is an open-enrollment, publicly funded charter school in Austin, Texas. The students often participate in out-of-school activities, such as national figure skating, gymnastics, and equestrian competitions. Chaparral Star Academy offers an intensive curriculum designed for students making use of a more compact daily schedule. Students may choose from a morning session or an afternoon session. The schedule is ideal for highly motivated students involved in major programs outside of the classroom and families in need of a more flexible daily schedule.

== Lower school ==
Grades K-5, core subjects

== Middle school ==
Grade 6–8, high school preparatory curriculum, core subjects which allows students the opportunity to earn high school credits.

== Upper school ==
Grade 9–12, college preparatory curriculum based on the State of Texas Distinguished high school graduation requirements, AP level instruction in most core subjects, broad range of electives, college-bound literature studies, and activities including Martial Arts and award-winning Speech and Debate. 11th and 12th grade students are strongly encouraged to participate in ACC's dual credit program, earning both high school and college credit simultaneously.

Grade K-6 are limited to 15 students; middle school and high school is limited to 20.

First graduating class: 2001

== School awards ==
A 2008 National Charter School of the Year

Rated Exemplary by the TEA in 2009 and 2010

A 5-Year TEA Recognized Campus 2006–2008

21 Gold Performance Awards

Ranked as the number 1 Public High School in Austin by Children at Risk in 2012

A 2016 National Speech and Debate Association Middle School of Excellence

== Notable alumni ==
- Colt Walker, American gymnast
