= Wheeler, Tillamook County, Oregon =

Wheeler, Oregon
- City
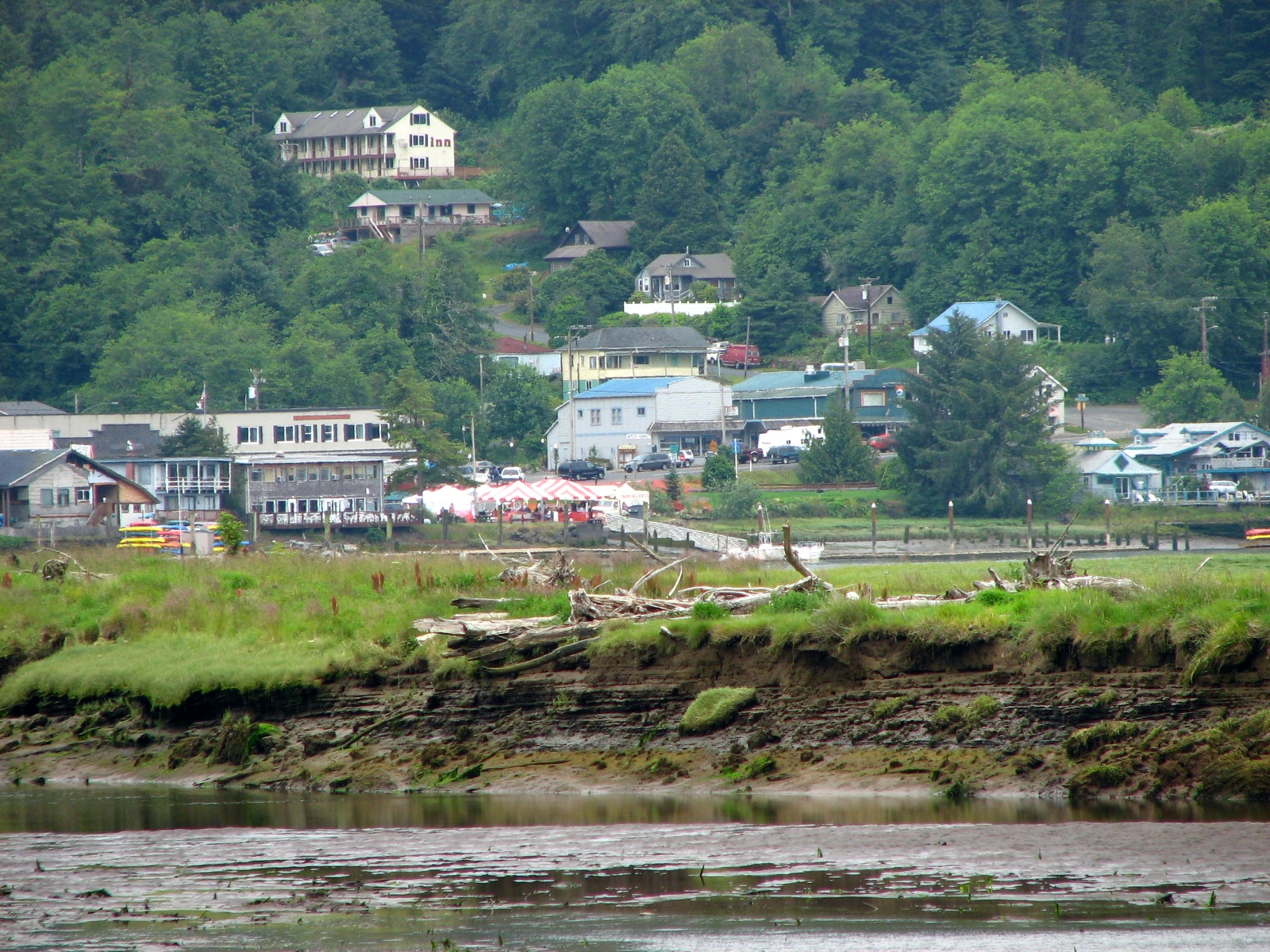
- Wheeler, as seen across the Nehalem River estuary

- Location in Oregon
- Coordinates: 45°41′17″N 123°52′59″W
- Country: United States
- State: Oregon
- County: Tillamook
- Incorporated: 1914

Government
  - Type: Council - Manager
  - Mayor: Clif Kemp
  - City manager: Wes Wootten

Area
  - Total: 0.52 sq mi (1.35 km^{2})
  - Land: 0.52 sq mi (1.35 km^{2})
  - Water: 0 sq mi (0.00 km^{2})
- Elevation: 52 ft (16 m)

Population (2020)
  - Total: 422
  - Density: 808.9/sq mi (312.32/km^{2})
- Time zone: UTC-8 (Pacific)
  - Summer (DST): UTC-7 (Pacific)
- ZIP code: 97147
- Area code: 503
- FIPS code: 41-81300
- GNIS feature ID: 2412250
- Website: www.cityofwheeleror.gov

Wheeler is a city in Tillamook County, Oregon, United States. The population was 414 at the 2010 census. It is named after Coleman Wheeler, who opened a sawmill in the town and had a lumber business; Coleman is a great-grandfather of Ted Wheeler, who was mayor of Portland, Oregon, from 2017 to 2024.

== Geography ==
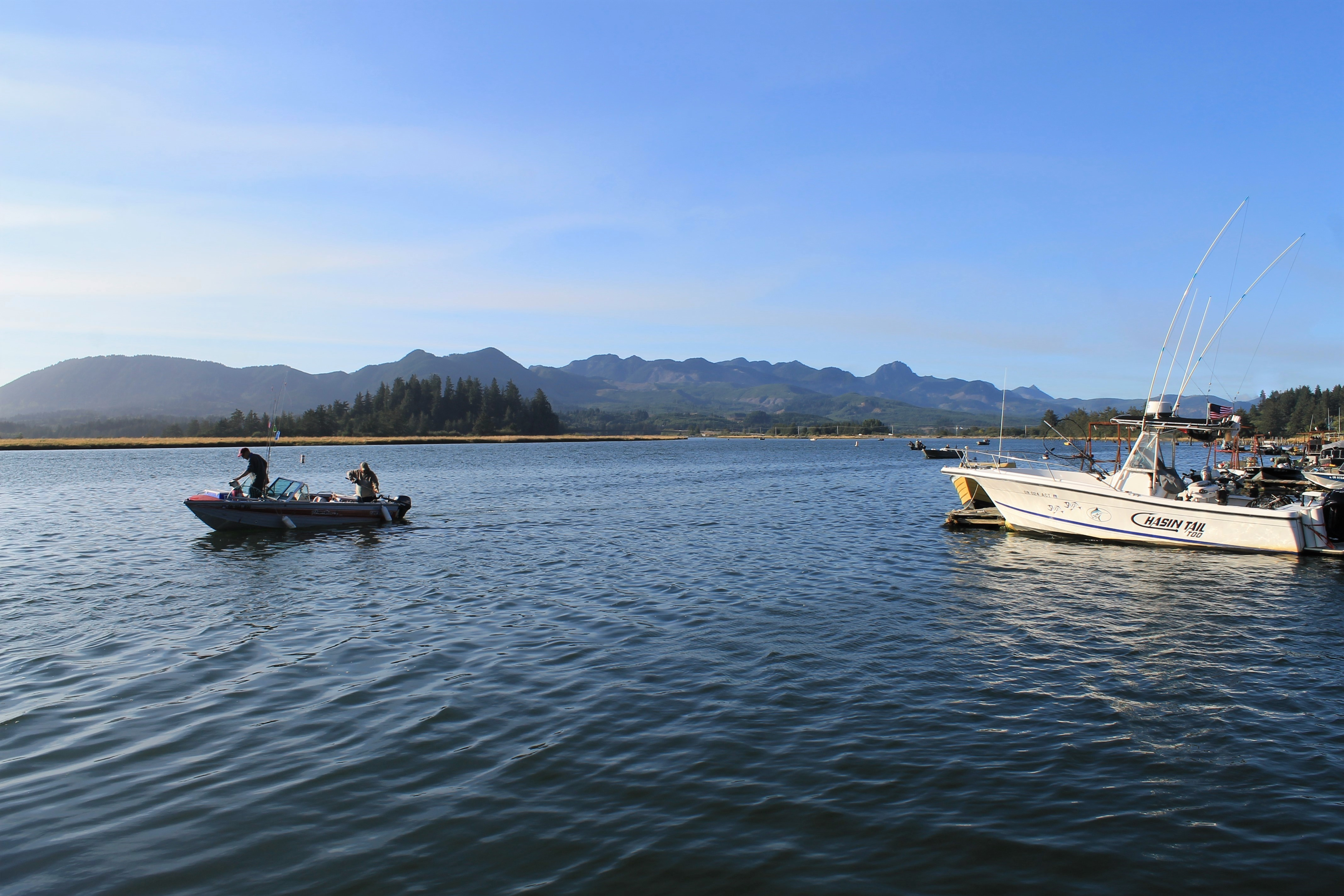
Nehalem River in Wheeler

According to the United States Census Bureau, the city has a total area of 0.52 square miles (1.35 km^{2}), all of it land.

== History ==
In 1900, Coleman Wheeler and others incorporated the Wheeler Lumber Company and the Nehalem Transportation Company. The C.H. Wheeler barge was launched in the same year and sunk, with a loss of life, in 1901.

A Tillamook Observer article from September 1913 touts the town's founding, the riches of the Wheeler Lumber Company, and says the Union Fishermans Cooperative Packing Company was "employing only white labor".

== Demographics ==
Historical population
Census	Pop.	Note	%±
1930	280		—
1940	259		−7.5%
1950	291		12.4%
1960	237		−18.6%
1970	262		10.5%
1980	319		21.8%
1990	335		5.0%
2000	391		16.7%
2010	414		5.9%
2020	422		1.9%
U.S. Decennial Census

=== 2010 census ===
As of the census of 2010, there were 414 people, 197 households, and 97 families living in the city. The population density was 796.2 inhabitants per square mile (307.4/km^{2}). There were 289 housing units at an average density of 555.8 per square mile (214.6/km^{2}). The racial makeup of the city was 96.6% White, 0.2% Native American, 0.5% Asian, 0.2% Pacific Islander, 1.2% from other races, and 1.2% from two or more races. Hispanic or Latino of any race were 3.4% of the population.

There were 197 households, of which 14.7% had children under the age of 18 living with them, 35.0% were married couples living together, 10.7% had a female householder with no husband present, 3.6% had a male householder with no wife present, and 50.8% were non-families. 40.1% of all households were made up of individuals, and 15.3% had someone living alone who was 65 years of age or older. The average household size was 1.87 and the average family size was 2.40.

The median age in the city was 57.4 years. 12.3% of residents were under the age of 18; 3.4% were between the ages of 18 and 24; 18.6% were from 25 to 44; 34.3% were from 45 to 64; and 31.4% were 65 years of age or older. The gender makeup of the city was 46.1% male and 53.9% female.

=== 2000 census ===
As of the census of 2000, there were 391 people, 176 households, and 93 families living in the city. The population density was 545.7 inhabitants per square mile (210.7/km^{2}). There were 244 housing units at an average density of 340.5 per square mile (131.5/km^{2}). The racial makeup of the city was 93.09% White, 0.77% Native American, 1.79% Asian, 1.79% from other races, and 2.56% from two or more races. Hispanic or Latino of any race were 2.81% of the population.

There were 176 households, out of which 16.5% had children under the age of 18 living with them, 44.9% were married couples living together, 6.8% had a female householder with no husband present, and 46.6% were non-families. 35.8% of all households were made up of individuals, and 13.1% had someone living alone who was 65 years of age or older. The average household size was 1.98 and the average family size was 2.54.

In the city, the population was spread out, with 14.3% under the age of 18, 6.4% from 18 to 24, 19.9% from 25 to 44, 31.7% from 45 to 64, and 27.6% who were 65 years of age or older. The median age was 50 years. For every 100 females, there were 89.8 males. For every 100 females age 18 and over, there were 91.4 males.

The median income for a household in the city was $29,000, and the median income for a family was $31,161. Males had a median income of $26,364 versus $21,429 for females. The per capita income for the city was $16,535. About 10.9% of families and 16.2% of the population were below the poverty line, including 13.6% of those under age 18 and none of those age 65 or over.

== Education ==
It is in the Neah-Kah-Nie School District 56. The district's comprehensive high school is Neah-Kah-Nie High School.

The county is in the Tillamook Bay Community College district.
