= Nehalem, Oregon =

- City
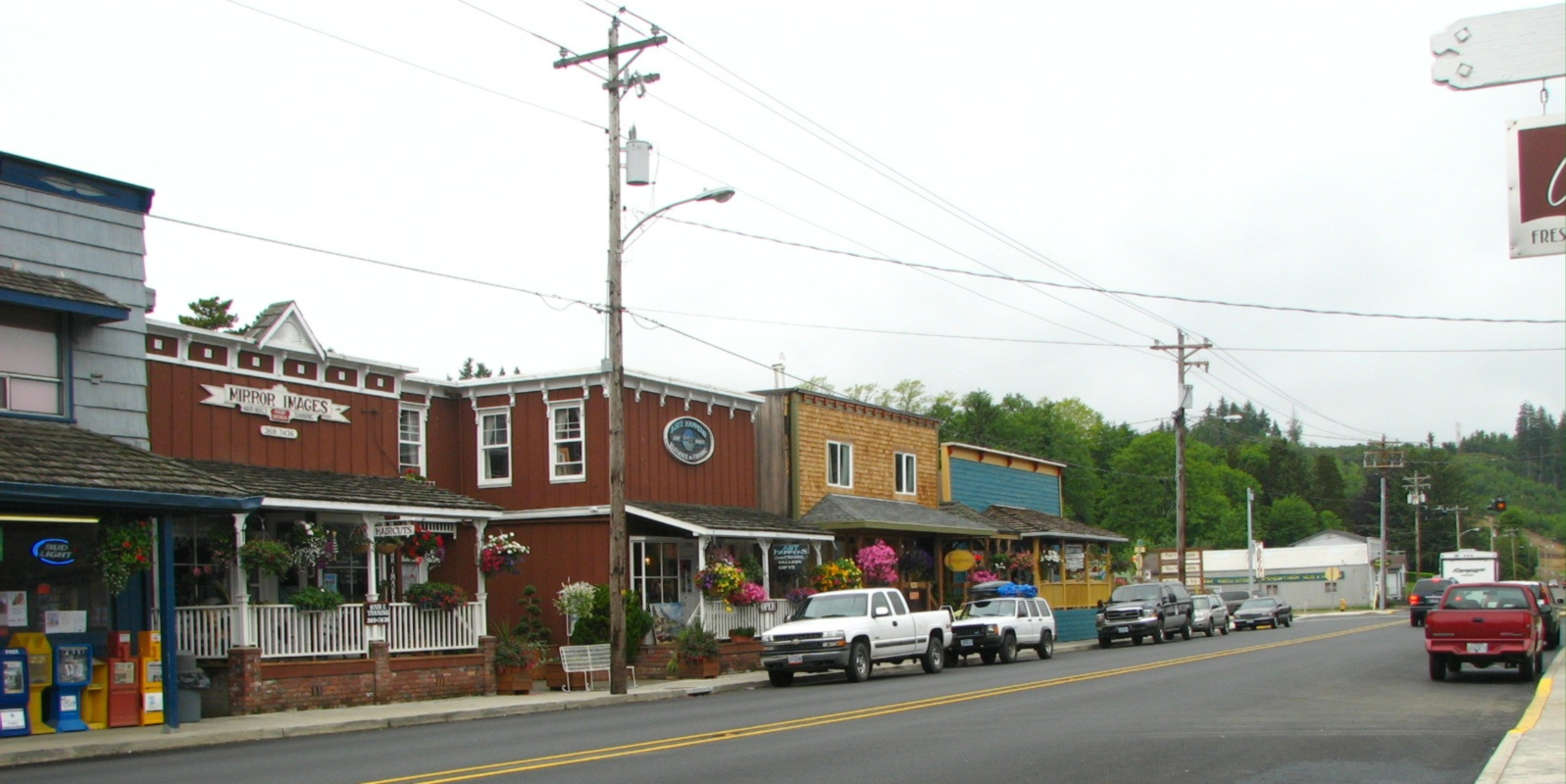
- Nehalem business district looking east along Highway 101

- Location in Oregon
- Coordinates: 45°43′10″N 123°53′38″W
- Country: United States
- State: Oregon
- County: Tillamook
- Incorporated: 1889

Government
  - Type: Mayor/City Council
  - Mayor: Phil Chick

Area
  - Total: 0.27 sq mi (0.69 km^{2})
  - Land: 0.27 sq mi (0.69 km^{2})
  - Water: 0 sq mi (0.00 km^{2})
- Elevation: 10 ft (3.0 m)

Population (2020)
  - Total: 270
  - Density: 1,006/sq mi (388.5/km^{2})
- Time zone: UTC-8 (Pacific)
  - Summer (DST): UTC-7 (Pacific)
- ZIP code: 97131
- Area code: 503
- FIPS code: 41-51700
- GNIS feature ID: 2411222
- Website: www.nehalem.gov

Nehalem /nɪˈheɪləm/ is a city in Tillamook County, Oregon, United States. Incorporated in 1889, the city lies along the Nehalem River and Nehalem Bay near the Pacific Ocean. It is bisected by U.S. Route 101. The population was 355 at the 2020 census.

== History ==
Nehalem was named for the Nehalem tribe of Native American Indians, also known as the Tillamook People, who traditionally inhabited the area. In the native Salishan languages, Nehalem means "place where people live" Early variations of the name include "Naalem" and "Ne-ay-lem."

The city of Nehalem was established by European Americans in the latter portion of the nineteenth century, rapidly thriving with logging, fishing, and shipping. In June 1913, Joseph C. Smith became the town's first mayor. Prior to 1913, the town was governed by elected trustees.

As the Northwestern logging industry slowed during the twentieth century, the city's economy also cooled. The city used to stretch over the river on log planks, where a lumber mill cut logs that came down a railroad track on the Nehalem River. Wood pilings that held up this track can be found in the North Fork Nehalem River. On the front of Nehalem Elementary School is a facade which proclaims "Union High School" from when the area was less populated and could support its own Elementary and high schools. Currently there is an elementary school and a community pool/rec. center run by the North County Recreation District which hosts a number of classes including those for Tillamook Bay Community College.

According to the October 1977 of La Posta Postal History Journal, Nehalem's post office was established in August 1870. It was originally located in the home of Samuel Corwin. In February 1884, the name of the Nehalem Post Office was changed to "Onion Peak" when John Alley became the postmaster and moved the post office to his home, which was standard practice for the time. Because Alley's home was considerably north of the original Nehalem town site, Alley requested a name change to "Onion Peak," a nearby mountain and prominent geographic feature of the area. In May 1884, Nehalem residents petitioned for a new post office closer to town. The request was granted with Henry Ober serving as postmaster. The Onion Peak Post Office closed in 1893.

For many decades the State highway officials in Oregon had seen the route that Highway 101 took through Wheeler and Nehalem as temporary for the highway. During that time, the long-term plan for the highway was to move it along the Nehalem Spit, offering a longer view of Nehalem Bay and the Pacific Ocean. When the plans for this change began to take shape in the late 1960s the community backlash from the two towns was so intense that officials decided to leave the highway in its existing layout.

Nehalem has an elevation of 11 feet. Lying so close to sea level, the area suffers intermittent floods. A 1996 storm caused particular damage, to local dairy farms. In November 2006, heavy rains caused flooding in Nehalem, resulting in $1 million in damage.

Nehalem has been noted multiple times in pop culture. The Portland-based band Everclear has a song, "Nehalem", about life in the town, on its Sparkle and Fade album. In 1995, Nike issued its Nike Air Nehalem Water Sandal and Portland-based Columbia Sportswear named one of its sandal styles after Nehalem. And in 2008, Intel named its 45 nm microarchitecture "Nehalem." Portland-based Leatherman Tool Group named one of its stainless steel knives the "Nehalem."

Nehalem was the location for the 2000 HGTV Dream Home Contest, which awarded a furnished home and an automobile.

The Nehalem Bay Dune Site, which is listed in the National Register of Historic Places, is a prehistoric site in the Nehalem vicinity dating to 1310 A.D. The exact location is restricted to protect the site.

== Geography ==
According to the United States Census Bureau, the city has a total area of 0.24 square miles (0.62 km^{2}), all of it land.

The "business district" runs one block along Highway 101, parallel with the Nehalem River. Many of the buildings are raised to avoid flooding. Nehalem has one traffic signal.

=== Climate ===
This region experiences mild, dry summers, with no average monthly temperatures above 71.6 °F (22.0 °C). According to the Köppen Climate Classification system, Nehalem has a warm-summer Mediterranean climate, abbreviated "Csb" on climate maps. Nehalem has a moderate maritime climate with mild summers and cool winters. Average summer (June–August) temperatures range from 50 degrees to 70 degrees. In the winter months (December–February), average temperatures range from 38 degrees to 52 degrees.

Due to its proximity to the coast, the area receives significant annual precipitation, particularly in the fall and winter months. While summers are generally dry and sunny, winters tend to be cool and wet with occasional snowfall, especially in the coast mountain range. On average, there are 10 inches of rainfall each month between November and March. Overall, the area gets about 95 inches of rain, on average, annually. According to a report from Portland State University, higher elevations near Nehalem and the Nehalem Basin can receive 200 inches of rain in a year.

== Economy ==
Because of its proximity to the coast, state parks and campgrounds, and the Nehalem River and Nehalem Bay, the area is a popular tourist destination. According to data from 2021, the largest industries in Nehalem are Accommodation & Food Services, Health Care & Social Assistance, and Construction. The most common job groups include Construction & Extraction, Building & Grounds/Cleaning & Maintenance, and Sales & Related occupations.

Established in 1909, the Port of Nehalem is a small coastal port in Tillamook County whose primary district activities include maintaining navigational access and safety on Nehalem Bay. The Port owns one dock on the Nehalem waterfront which is primarily used by its tug and transient boats for channel maintenance and navigation activities. It also deploys markers and navigational buoys throughout the Lower Nehalem River and Nehalem Bay to service vessels during the fishing and boating season.

== Arts & Culture ==
Each year, the 192-seat Performing Arts Center at the North County Recreation District (NCRD) community center in Nehalem hosts various visual arts and musical performances. The Performing Arts Center is home to the Riverbend Players, a nonprofit 501(c) (3) community theater group based in Nehalem.

== Parks & Recreation ==
Nehalem has two city parks: Nehalem City Park on Hugo Street, which features playground equipment, and barbeque and picnic equipment; and Neil M. Walker Veteran's Park, a small park near the Nehalem River Bridge on Hwy 101. It also has two public docks, both located in downtown Nehalem, which provide direct access to the Nehalem River for kayaking and fishing.

The North County Recreation District (NCRD) is a community center that features a fitness center, pickleball courts, a skateboard facility, gymnasium, natatorium, and several meeting rooms and galleries.

== Education ==
It is in the Neah-Kah-Nie School District 56, which covers the north of the county. Children in Nehalem attend school in the Neah-Kah-Nie School District located in north Tillamook County, Oregon. There are four schools in the district: Neah-Kah-Nie High School (whose mascot is the Pirates), Neah-Kah-Nie Middle School, Garibaldi Grade School, and Nehalem Elementary School which located on 8th Street on the north side of Nehalem.

The county is in the Tillamook Bay Community College district.

== Demographics ==
Historical population
Census	Pop.	Note	%±
1900	59		—
1910	119		101.7%
1920	192		61.3%
1930	245		27.6%
1940	247		0.8%
1950	270		9.3%
1960	233		−13.7%
1970	241		3.4%
1980	258		7.1%
1990	232		−10.1%
2000	203		−12.5%
2010	271		33.5%
2020	270		−0.4%
U.S. Decennial Census

=== 2020 census ===
As of the 2020 census, Nehalem had a population of 270. The median age was 49.5 years. 16.3% of residents were under the age of 18 and 20.7% of residents were 65 years of age or older. For every 100 females there were 88.8 males, and for every 100 females age 18 and over there were 94.8 males age 18 and over.

100.0% of residents lived in urban areas, while 0% lived in rural areas.

There were 119 households in Nehalem, of which 30.3% had children under the age of 18 living in them. Of all households, 41.2% were married-couple households, 21.0% were households with a male householder and no spouse or partner present, and 28.6% were households with a female householder and no spouse or partner present. About 24.4% of all households were made up of individuals and 10.9% had someone living alone who was 65 years of age or older.

There were 179 housing units, of which 33.5% were vacant. Among occupied housing units, 72.3% were owner-occupied and 27.7% were renter-occupied. The homeowner vacancy rate was 7.5% and the rental vacancy rate was 5.3%.

Racial composition as of the 2020 census
Race	Number	Percent
White	221	81.9%
Black or African American	0	0%
American Indian and Alaska Native	4	1.5%
Asian	3	1.1%
Native Hawaiian and Other Pacific Islander	1	0.4%
Some other race	5	1.9%
Two or more races	36	13.3%
Hispanic or Latino (of any race)	10	3.7%

=== 2010 census ===
As of the census of 2010, there were 271 people, 116 households, and 72 families residing in the city. The population density was 1,129.2 inhabitants per square mile (436.0/km^{2}). There were 155 housing units at an average density of 645.8 per square mile (249.3/km^{2}). The racial makeup of the city was 93.0% White, 0.4% Native American, 1.1% Asian, 3.0% from other races, and 2.6% from two or more races. Hispanic or Latino of any race were 5.9% of the population.

Of the City's 116 households, 20.7% had children under the age of 18 living with them, 46.6% were married couples living together, 11.2% had a female householder with no husband present, 4.3% had a male householder with no wife present, and 37.9% were non-families. 25.0% of all households were made up of individuals, and 10.4% had someone living alone who was 65 years of age or older. The average household size was 2.34 and the average family size was 2.78.

The median age in the city was 44.2 years. 16.2% of residents were under the age of 18; 10.3% were between the ages of 18 and 24; 24.3% were from 25 to 44; 27.6% were from 45 to 64; and 21.4% were 65 years of age or older. The gender makeup of the city was 47.2% male and 52.8% female.

=== 2000 census ===
As of the census of 2000, there were 203 people, 84 households, and 58 families residing in the city. The population density was 860.6 inhabitants per square mile (332.3/km^{2}). There were 121 housing units at an average density of 513.0 per square mile (198.1/km^{2}). The racial makeup of the city was 98.03% White, and 1.97% from two or more races. Hispanic or Latino of any race were 1.48% of the population.

Of the City's 84 households, 25.0% had children under the age of 18 living with them, 56.0% were married couples living together, 10.7% had a female householder with no husband present, and 29.8% were non-families. 22.6% of all households were made up of individuals, and 9.5% had someone living alone who was 65 years of age or older. The average household size was 2.42 and the average family size was 2.88.

In the city, the population was spread out, with 25.1% under the age of 18, 4.4% from 18 to 24, 24.1% from 25 to 44, 24.1% from 45 to 64, and 22.2% who were 65 years of age or older. The median age was 42 years. For every 100 females, there were 107.1 males. For every 100 females age 18 and over, there were 94.9 males.

The median income for a household in the city was $40,250, and the median income for a family was $47,679. Males had a median income of $30,000 versus $27,813 for females. The per capita income for the city was $15,408. About 9.0% of families and 7.7% of the population were below the poverty line, including 5.5% of those under the age of 18 and 3.0% of those 65 or over.
