= Bay City, Oregon =

- City
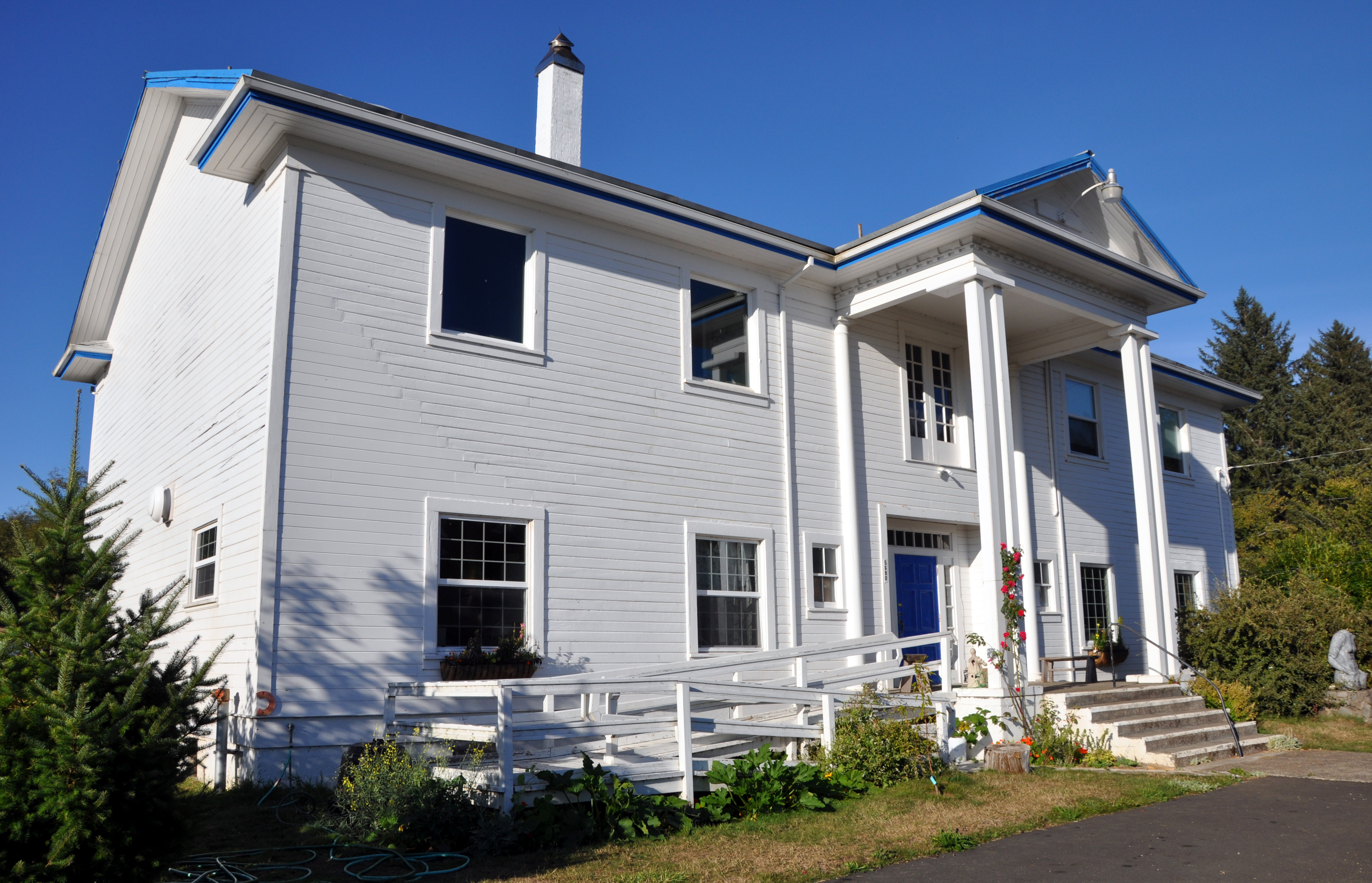
- Bay City Arts Center
- Nickname: The Pearl of Tillamook Bay
- Location in Oregon

- Location within Oregon Location within the United States Location within North America
- Coordinates: 45°31′17″N 123°53′08″W
- Country: United States
- State: Oregon
- County: Tillamook
- Incorporated: 1910

Government
  - Mayor: Liane Welch

Area
  - Total: 1.62 sq mi (4.19 km^{2})
  - Land: 1.26 sq mi (3.27 km^{2})
  - Water: 0.36 sq mi (0.92 km^{2})
- Elevation: 108 ft (33 m)

Population (2020)
  - Total: 1,389
  - Density: 1,100.5/sq mi (424.89/km^{2})
- Time zone: UTC-8 (Pacific)
  - Summer (DST): UTC-7 (Pacific)
- ZIP code: 97107
- Area code: 503
- FIPS code: 41-04800
- GNIS feature ID: 2409797
- Website: www.ci.bay-city.or.us

Bay City is a city in Tillamook County, Oregon, United States. As of the 2020 census, Bay City had a population of 1,389.

== Geography ==
According to the United States Census Bureau, the city has a total area of 1.62 square miles (4.20 km^{2}), of which 1.26 square miles (3.26 km^{2}) is land and 0.36 square miles (0.93 km^{2}) is water.

=== Climate ===
This region experiences warm (but not hot) and dry summers, with no average monthly temperatures above 71.6 °F (22.0 °C). According to the Köppen Climate Classification system, Bay City has a warm-summer Mediterranean climate, abbreviated Csb on climate maps.

== Demographics ==
Historical population
| Census | Pop. | Note | %± |
|---|---|---|---|
| 1900 | 203 | | — |
| 1910 | 281 | | 38.4% |
| 1920 | 511 | | 81.9% |
| 1930 | 427 | | −16.4% |
| 1940 | 379 | | −11.2% |
| 1950 | 761 | | 100.8% |
| 1960 | 996 | | 30.9% |
| 1970 | 898 | | −9.8% |
| 1980 | 986 | | 9.8% |
| 1990 | 1,027 | | 4.2% |
| 2000 | 1,149 | | 11.9% |
| 2010 | 1,286 | | 11.9% |
| 2020 | 1,389 | | 8.0% |
U.S. Decennial Census

=== 2020 census ===
As of the 2020 census, Bay City had a population of 1,389. The median age was 48.7 years. 17.4% of residents were under the age of 18 and 26.0% of residents were 65 years of age or older. For every 100 females there were 93.2 males, and for every 100 females age 18 and over there were 96.1 males age 18 and over.

0% of residents lived in urban areas, while 100.0% lived in rural areas.

There were 584 households in Bay City, of which 23.6% had children under the age of 18 living in them. Of all households, 50.0% were married-couple households, 17.3% were households with a male householder and no spouse or partner present, and 22.1% were households with a female householder and no spouse or partner present. About 24.6% of all households were made up of individuals and 14.2% had someone living alone who was 65 years of age or older.

There were 686 housing units, of which 14.9% were vacant. Among occupied housing units, 79.6% were owner-occupied and 20.4% were renter-occupied. The homeowner vacancy rate was 2.9% and the rental vacancy rate was 5.4%.

Racial composition as of the 2020 census
| Race | Number | Percent |
|---|---|---|
| White | 1,163 | 83.7% |
| Black or African American | 2 | 0.1% |
| American Indian and Alaska Native | 16 | 1.2% |
| Asian | 21 | 1.5% |
| Native Hawaiian and Other Pacific Islander | 2 | 0.1% |
| Some other race | 70 | 5.0% |
| Two or more races | 115 | 8.3% |
| Hispanic or Latino (of any race) | 151 | 10.9% |

=== 2010 census ===
As of the census of 2010, there were 1,286 people, 546 households, and 352 families living in the city. The population density was 1,020.6 inhabitants per square mile (394.1/km^{2}). There were 650 housing units at an average density of 515.9 per square mile (199.2/km^{2}). The racial makeup of the city was 92.7% White, 0.8% Native American, 0.9% Asian, 0.1% Pacific Islander, 3.3% from other races, and 2.3% from two or more races. Hispanic or Latino of any race were 6.7% of the population.

There were 546 households, of which 24.9% had children under the age of 18 living with them, 51.5% were married couples living together, 7.5% had a female householder with no husband present, 5.5% had a male householder with no wife present, and 35.5% were non-families. 24.4% of all households were made up of individuals, and 10.4% had someone living alone who was 65 years of age or older. The average household size was 2.36 and the average family size was 2.80.

The median age in the city was 46.5 years. 19.4% of residents were under the age of 18; 7.1% were between the ages of 18 and 24; 22.4% were from 25 to 44; 30.3% were from 45 to 64; and 21.2% were 65 years of age or older. The gender makeup of the city was 50.9% male and 49.1% female.

=== 2000 census ===
As of the census of 2000, there were 1,149 people, 493 households, and 336 families living in the city. The population density was 903.4 people per square mile (348.8 people/km^{2}). There were 579 housing units at an average density of 455.2 per square mile (175.8/km^{2}). The racial makeup of the city was 93.73% White, 0.44% African American, 1.74% Native American, 0.70% Asian, 0.17% Pacific Islander, 0.87% from other races, and 2.35% from two or more races. Hispanic or Latino of any race were 3.13% of the population.

There were 493 households, out of which 24.3% had children under the age of 18 living with them, 58.6% were married couples living together, 6.9% had a female householder with no husband present, and 31.8% were non-families. 26.4% of all households were made up of individuals, and 11.8% had someone living alone who was 65 years of age or older. The average household size was 2.33 and the average family size was 2.81.

In the city, the population was spread out, with 20.3% under the age of 18, 6.6% from 18 to 24, 26.5% from 25 to 44, 27.5% from 45 to 64, and 19.1% who were 65 years of age or older. The median age was 43 years. For every 100 females, there were 94.1 males. For every 100 females age 18 and over, there were 95.7 males.

The median income for a household in the city was $33,375, and the median income for a family was $41,563. Males had a median income of $33,558 versus $21,827 for females. The per capita income for the city was $18,731. About 9.1% of families and 12.4% of the population were below the poverty line, including 17.2% of those under age 18 and 8.4% of those age 65 or over.

== Arts and culture ==
The Bay City Arts Center is a non-profit organization that supports arts programs and events.

== Education ==
It is in the Neah-Kah-Nie School District 56. The district's comprehensive high school is Neah-Kah-Nie High School.

The county is in the Tillamook Bay Community College district.

== Notable people ==
- Nellie Owens, one of three people upon whom the character of Nellie Oleson from Little House on the Prairie was based, lived in Bay City.
