= Rockaway Beach, Oregon =

- City
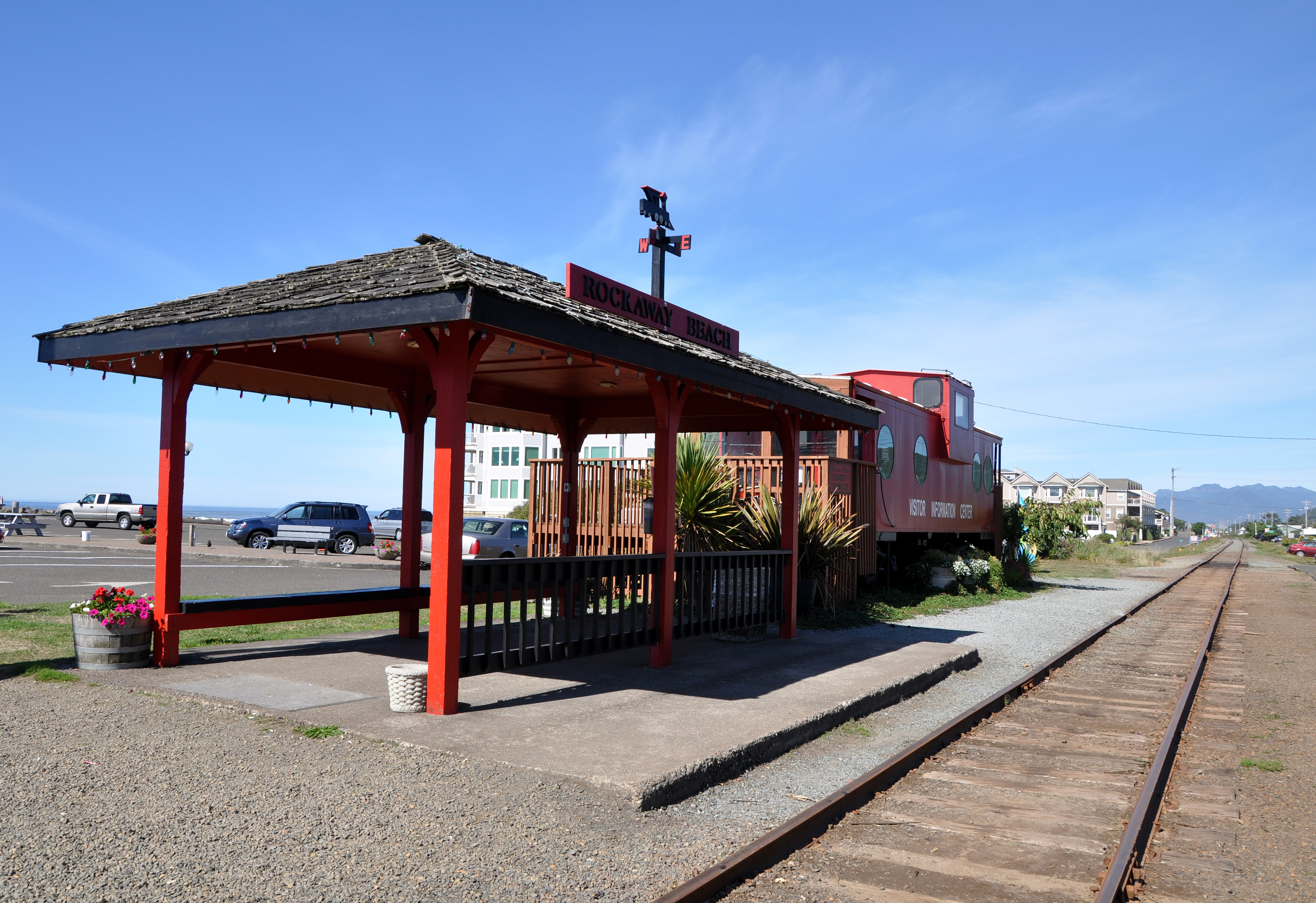
- Visitor information center

- Location in Oregon
- Coordinates: 45°37′28″N 123°56′14″W
- Country: United States
- State: Oregon
- County: Tillamook
- Incorporated: 1943

Government
  - Mayor: Charles McNeilly

Area
  - Total: 1.71 sq mi (4.42 km^{2})
  - Land: 1.60 sq mi (4.14 km^{2})
  - Water: 0.11 sq mi (0.28 km^{2})
- Elevation: 13 ft (4.0 m)

Population (2020)
  - Total: 1,441
  - Density: 900.9/sq mi (347.83/km^{2})
- Time zone: UTC-8 (Pacific)
  - Summer (DST): UTC-7 (Pacific)
- ZIP code: 97136
- Area codes: 503 and 971
- FIPS code: 41-62900
- GNIS feature ID: 2410977
- Website: www.rockawaybeachoregon.gov

Rockaway Beach is a city in Tillamook County, Oregon, United States. As of the 2020 census, Rockaway Beach had a population of 1,441.

The city houses the Rockaway Beach Old Growth Cedar Preserve, a 46-acre (19 ha) wetlands preserve which opened in 2019. The preserve has an elevated walkway, which terminates at a large cedar tree known as The Big Tree, which is estimated to be 500–900 years old.

== History ==
The community of Rockaway was established as a seaside resort in 1909 by the Rockaway Beach Company. It was named after Rockaway Beach on Queens, New York. Rockaway post office was established in 1911. Rockaway was connected by train to Portland in 1912. The name of the city was changed to Rockaway Beach in 1987.

The Pronto Pup, a brand of corn dog, was invented at Rockaway in the late 1930s.

== Geography ==
According to the United States Census Bureau, the city has a total area of 1.71 square miles (4.43 km^{2}), of which 1.60 square miles (4.14 km^{2}) is land and 0.11 square miles (0.28 km^{2}) is water.

== Demographics ==
Historical population
Census	Pop.	Note	%±
1930	300		—
1950	1,027		—
1960	771		−24.9%
1970	665		−13.7%
1980	906		36.2%
1990	970		7.1%
2000	1,267		30.6%
2010	1,312		3.6%
2020	1,441		9.8%
1930 population U.S. Decennial Census

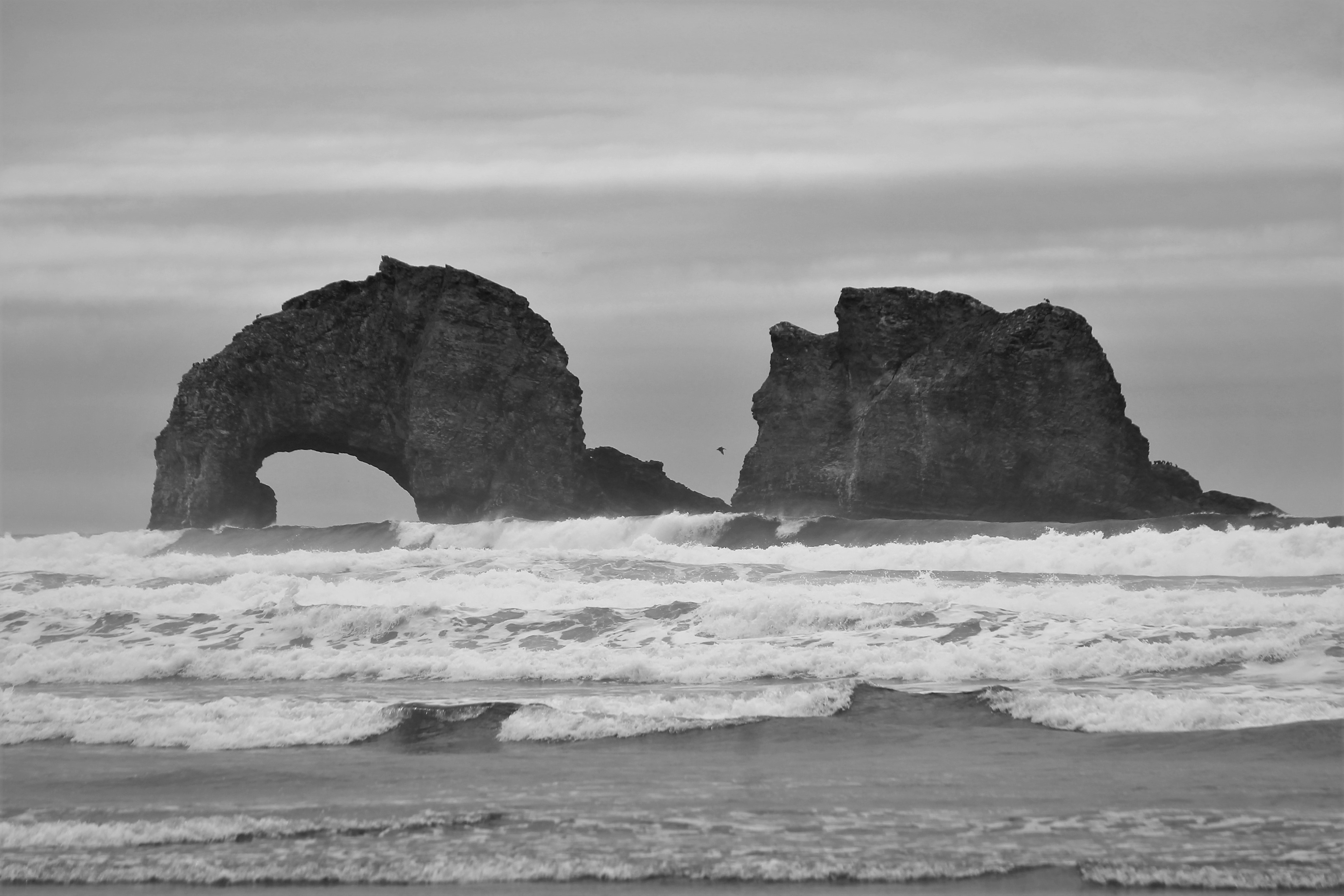
Rock formation at Rockaway Beach

=== 2020 census ===
As of the 2020 census, Rockaway Beach had a population of 1,441. The median age was 59.1 years. 11.7% of residents were under the age of 18 and 34.5% of residents were 65 years of age or older. For every 100 females there were 97.9 males, and for every 100 females age 18 and over there were 93.5 males age 18 and over.

98.2% of residents lived in urban areas, while 1.8% lived in rural areas.

There were 737 households in Rockaway Beach, of which 15.7% had children under the age of 18 living in them. Of all households, 41.2% were married-couple households, 20.8% were households with a male householder and no spouse or partner present, and 29.4% were households with a female householder and no spouse or partner present. About 33.8% of all households were made up of individuals and 17.6% had someone living alone who was 65 years of age or older.

There were 1,980 housing units, of which 62.8% were vacant. Among occupied housing units, 71.4% were owner-occupied and 28.6% were renter-occupied. The homeowner vacancy rate was 1.3% and the rental vacancy rate was 7.0%.

Racial composition as of the 2020 census
Race	Number	Percent
White	1,247	86.5%
Black or African American	2	0.1%
American Indian and Alaska Native	12	0.8%
Asian	28	1.9%
Native Hawaiian and Other Pacific Islander	5	0.3%
Some other race	21	1.5%
Two or more races	126	8.7%
Hispanic or Latino (of any race)	49	3.4%

=== 2010 census ===
As of the census of 2010, there were 1,312 people, 667 households, and 374 families living in the city. The population density was 820.0 inhabitants per square mile (316.6/km^{2}). There were 1,875 housing units at an average density of 1,171.9 per square mile (452.5/km^{2}). The racial makeup of the city was 94.4% White, 0.4% African American, 0.7% Native American, 0.7% Asian, 1.1% from other races, and 2.7% from two or more races. Hispanic or Latino of any race were 2.9% of the population.

There were 667 households, of which 16.8% had children under the age of 18 living with them, 44.8% were married couples living together, 8.1% had a female householder with no husband present, 3.1% had a male householder with no wife present, and 43.9% were non-families. 35.8% of all households were made up of individuals, and 16% had someone living alone who was 65 years of age or older. The average household size was 1.97 and the average family size was 2.52.

The median age in the city was 55.1 years. 13.3% of residents were under the age of 18; 4.4% were between the ages of 18 and 24; 16% were from 25 to 44; 37.4% were from 45 to 64; and 29% were 65 years of age or older. The gender makeup of the city was 48.8% male and 51.2% female.

=== 2000 census ===
As of the census of 2000, there were 1,267 people, 635 households, and 368 families living in the city. The population density was 821.0 inhabitants per square mile (317.0/km^{2}). There were 1,573 housing units at an average density of 1,019.3 per square mile (393.6/km^{2}). The racial makeup of the city was 95.82% White, 0.08% African American, 1.10% Native American, 0.63% Asian, 0.71% from other races, and 1.66% from two or more races. Hispanic or Latino of any race were 1.97% of the population.

There were 635 households, out of which 12.8% had children under the age of 18 living with them, 47.6% were married couples living together, 7.4% had a female householder with no husband present, and 41.9% were non-families. 35.3% of all households were made up of individuals, and 16.7% had someone living alone who was 65 years of age or older. The average household size was 1.99 and the average family size was 2.51.

In the city, the population was spread out, with 14.0% under the age of 18, 3.9% from 18 to 24, 20.1% from 25 to 44, 31.3% from 45 to 64, and 30.6% who were 65 years of age or older. The median age was 52 years. For every 100 females, there were 96.7 males. For every 100 females age 18 and over, there were 94.8 males.

The median income for a household in the city was $28,798, and the median income for a family was $35,742. Males had a median income of $30,956 versus $21,776 for females. The per capita income for the city was $17,766. About 7.0% of families and 10.8% of the population were below the poverty line, including 13.7% of those under age 18 and 5.9% of those age 65 or over.

== Education ==
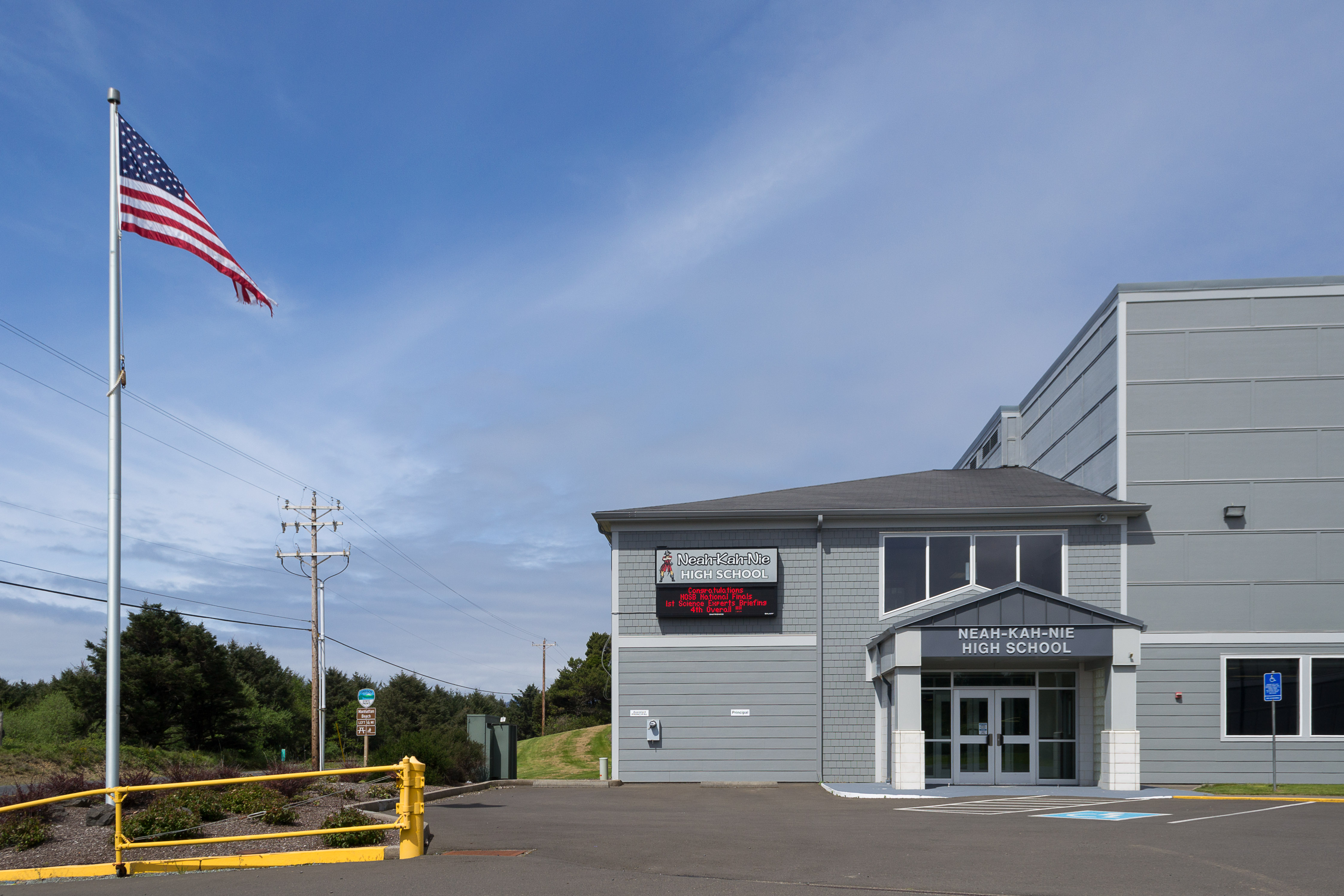
Neah-Kah-Nie High School

It is in the Neah-Kah-Nie School District 56. The district's comprehensive high school is Neah-Kah-Nie High School.

The county is in the Tillamook Bay Community College district.
