= National Register of Historic Places listings in Tillamook County, Oregon =

Location of Tillamook County in Oregon

This list presents the full set of buildings, structures, objects, sites, or districts designated on the National Register of Historic Places in Tillamook County, Oregon, United States, and offers brief descriptive information about each of them. The National Register recognizes places of national, state, or local historic significance across the United States. Out of over 90,000 National Register sites nationwide, Oregon is home to over 2,000, and 30 of those are found in Tillamook County.

This National Park Service list is complete through NPS recent listings posted May 1, 2026.

== Current listings ==
	Name on the Register	Image	Date listed	Location	City or town	Description
1	35-TI-4 – Cronin Point Site		March 6, 2001 (#01000128)	Address restricted	Manzanita vicinity	This archeological site, occupied probably between 1600 and 1800 CE, is characterized by a quantity of burned rock, indicating a possible village site. Shards of Asian ceramicware link the site to the Nehalem Beeswax shipwreck and early contact with Europeans. Studies suggest that occupation ended abruptly, likely due to earthquake-related subsidence.
2	35-TI-75 – Spruce Tree Site		March 6, 2001 (#01000127)	Address restricted	Manzanita vicinity	This archaeological site likely represents a precontact/postcontact Nehalem Tillamook campsite used for subsistence activities, including fishing, hunting, food processing, tool manufacture, and related tasks. Radiocarbon dating based on a single sample suggests it may have been occupied as early as 1490 CE.
3	35-TI-76 – North Trail House Site		March 6, 2001 (#01000129)	Address restricted	Manzanita vicinity	
4	Archeological Site (35TI39)		September 10, 1997 (#97000993)	Address restricted	Netarts vicinity	
5	Archeological Site 35-TI-40		March 6, 2001 (#01000136)	Address restricted	Netarts vicinity	
6	Archeological Site 35TI1		September 10, 1997 (#97000989)	Address restricted	Netarts vicinity	
7	Archeological site 35TI36		September 10, 1997 (#97001000)	Address restricted	Netarts vicinity	
8	Archeological site 35TI38		September 10, 1997 (#97000997)	Address restricted	Netarts vicinity	
9	Archeological Site 35TI44		September 10, 1997 (#97000990)	Address restricted	Netarts vicinity	
10	Archeological Site 35TI45		September 10, 1997 (#97000994)	Address restricted	Netarts vicinity	
11	Archeological site 35TI54		September 10, 1997 (#97001001)	Address restricted	Netarts vicinity	
12	Cape Canyon Midden (35TI61)		September 10, 1997 (#97000998)	Address restricted	Netarts vicinity	
13	Cape Meares Lighthouse	Cape Meares Lighthouse	April 21, 1993 (#73002341)	Cape Meares, 5 miles (8.0 km) south of Tillamook Bay entrance 45°29′11″N 123°58′42″W	Tillamook	
14	Cove Creek Midden (35TI35)		September 10, 1997 (#97000999)	Address restricted	Netarts vicinity	
15	A. E. Doyle Cottage	A. E. Doyle Cottage	February 19, 1991 (#91000066)	37480 2nd St. 45°43′45″N 123°56′30″W	Neahkahnie Beach	
16	Mary Frances Isom Cottage	Mary Frances Isom Cottage	February 19, 1991 (#91000065)	37465 Beulah Reed Rd. 45°43′43″N 123°56′34″W	Neahkahnie Beach	
17	Nehalem Bay Dune Site		September 10, 1997 (#97000986)	Address restricted	Nehalem vicinity	
18	Nehalem Boat Ramp Midden (35TI62)		September 10, 1997 (#97000987)	Address restricted	Manzanita vicinity	
19	Netarts FCR Camp (35TI67)		September 10, 1997 (#97000992)	Address restricted	Netarts vicinity	
20	Netarts Marsh Site (35TI68)		September 10, 1997 (#97000991)	Address restricted	Netarts vicinity	
21	Netarts Spit FCR-Elko Site (35TI65)		September 10, 1997 (#97000996)	Address restricted	Netarts vicinity	
22	Netarts Spit Lithic Site		September 10, 1997 (#97000995)	Address restricted	Netarts vicinity	
23	Oceanside Site (35TI47)		September 10, 1997 (#97000988)	Address restricted	Oceanside vicinity	
24	Pine Grove Community House	Pine Grove Community House	July 3, 2017 (#100001276)	225 Laneda Ave. 45°43′07″N 123°56′12″W	Manzanita	
25	Smuggler Cove Shell Midden (35TI46)		September 10, 1997 (#97000985)	Address restricted	Neahkahnie Beach vicinity	The contents of this shell midden, including mussels, barnacles, and chiton, have been dated to around 1660 CE. The supposed wreck of a European ship nearby in the same period suggests the site may preserve information from both before and after contact between local people and Europeans.
26	U.S. Coast Guard Station – Tillamook Bay	U.S. Coast Guard Station – Tillamook Bay	December 10, 1993 (#93001337)	US 101; 45°33′31″N 123°55′13″W	Garibaldi	
27	U.S. Naval Air Station Dirigible Hangar B	U.S. Naval Air Station Dirigible Hangar B	March 29, 1989 (#89000201)	Off US 101 2.5 mi. SE of Tillamook; 45°25′13″N 123°48′17″W	Tillamook	Originally listed in 1989 along with Hangar A, which burned down in 1992.
28	U.S. Post Office	U.S. Post Office	March 1, 1985 (#85000546)	210 Laurel Ave. 45°27′24″N 123°50′32″W	Tillamook	
29	Harry F. Wentz Studio	Harry F. Wentz Studio	April 22, 1976 (#76001589)	North of Manzanita off U.S. Highway 101; 45°44′00″N 123°56′41″W	Neahkahnie Beach	Artist Harry F. Wentz and architect A. E. Doyle designed this 1916 bungalow, which came to be regarded as a prototype of the Northwest Regional style. Some characteristic features include: colors and materials associated with the Northwest; low massing with simple wall surfaces; porches with slender wooden supports; and siting to harmonize with the surrounding landscape.
30	Wilson River Bridge No. 01499	Wilson River Bridge No. 01499	August 5, 2005 (#05000825)	OR Coast 9, US101, MP 64.23; 45°28′42″N 123°50′40″W	Tillamook	

== See also ==
- National Register of Historic Places listings in Oregon
- Listings in neighboring counties: Clatsop, Lincoln, Polk, Washington, Yamhill
- Historic preservation
- History of Oregon
- Lists of Oregon-related topics
