= Spruce Tree Site =

- Spruce Tree Site (35TI75)
- U.S. National Register of Historic Places
- Location: Address restricted (Note: Federal and state laws and practices restrict general public access to information regarding the specific location of this resource. In some cases, this is to protect archeological sites from vandalism, while in other cases it is restricted at the request of the owner.)
- Nearest city: Manzanita, Oregon
- Area: 0.6 acres (0.24 ha)
- MPS: Native American Archeological Sites of the Oregon Coast MPS
- NRHP reference No.: 01000127
- Added to NRHP: March 6, 2001

The Spruce Tree Site (Smithsonian trinomial: 35TI75) is an archeological site located in Nehalem Bay State Park near Manzanita, Oregon, United States. The site likely represents a precontact/postcontact Nehalem Tillamook campsite used for subsistence activities, including fishing, hunting, food processing, tool manufacture, and related tasks. Radiocarbon dating based on a single sample suggests it may have been occupied as early as 1490 CE. The site has yielded rock flake debris, burned rock, and charcoal, while the presence of glass beads and small (2 to 3 mm) fragments of ceramic provide information potential related to early contacts between Europeans and the peoples of the Oregon coast. The porcelain fragments may also link it to the Nehalem Beeswax Shipwreck. (Note: The Beeswax Shipwreck was a Spanish ship engaged in the Manila–Acapulco trade in the 17th or 18th century. Its wreck while en route to New Spain introduced large quantities of beeswax, along with other items such as ceramics, into Native American trade along the Oregon Coast for a century or more afterward.) The site has been partially eroded, but significant cultural deposits remain above the water line. Submerged stumps amid the site indicate significant subsidence of over 1 meter (3 ft 3 in), possibly related to a large earthquake, which can help answer research questions about the effect of seismic activity on the peoples and landscapes of the Oregon coast as well as on the preservation of cultural remains.

The Spruce Tree Site was listed on the National Register of Historic Places in 2001.

== See also ==
- Cronin Point Site
- National Register of Historic Places listings in Tillamook County, Oregon
