= Smuggler Cove Shell Midden =

- Smuggler Cove Shell Midden (35TI46)
- U.S. National Register of Historic Places
- Location: Address restricted
- Nearest city: Neahkahnie Beach, Oregon
- Area: 0.3 acres (0.12 ha)
- MPS: Native American Archeological Sites of the Oregon Coast MPS
- NRHP reference No.: 97000985
- Added to NRHP: September 10, 1997

The Smuggler Cove Shell Midden (Smithsonian trinomial: 35TI46) is an archeological site located in Oswald West State Park near Neahkahnie Beach, Oregon, United States. First documented by archeologists in 1976, the midden has been found to contain remains of mussels, barnacles, and chiton to a depth of approximately 30 centimeters (12 in). Radiocarbon dating of a single sample of shell debris indicates that the Smuggler Cove campsite was occupied around 1660 CE, approximately the same date as the supposed wreck of a European ship at nearby Nehalem Spit, suggesting the site may preserve information from both before and after first contact between local people and Europeans. The site has been heavily damaged by construction of recreational facilities and coastal erosion, but a significant portion remains with potential to contribute to future research. Data generated from the site may help answer questions related to environmental change in the Oregon Coast region, settlement and subsistence patterns, emergence of ethnographic patterns among coastal people, the change in cultural patterns from before to after contact with European Americans, and other topics.

The Smuggler Cove Shell Midden was listed on the National Register of Historic Places in 1997.

== See also ==
- National Register of Historic Places listings in Tillamook County, Oregon
