= Neahkahnie Mountain =

Mountain in Oregon, United States

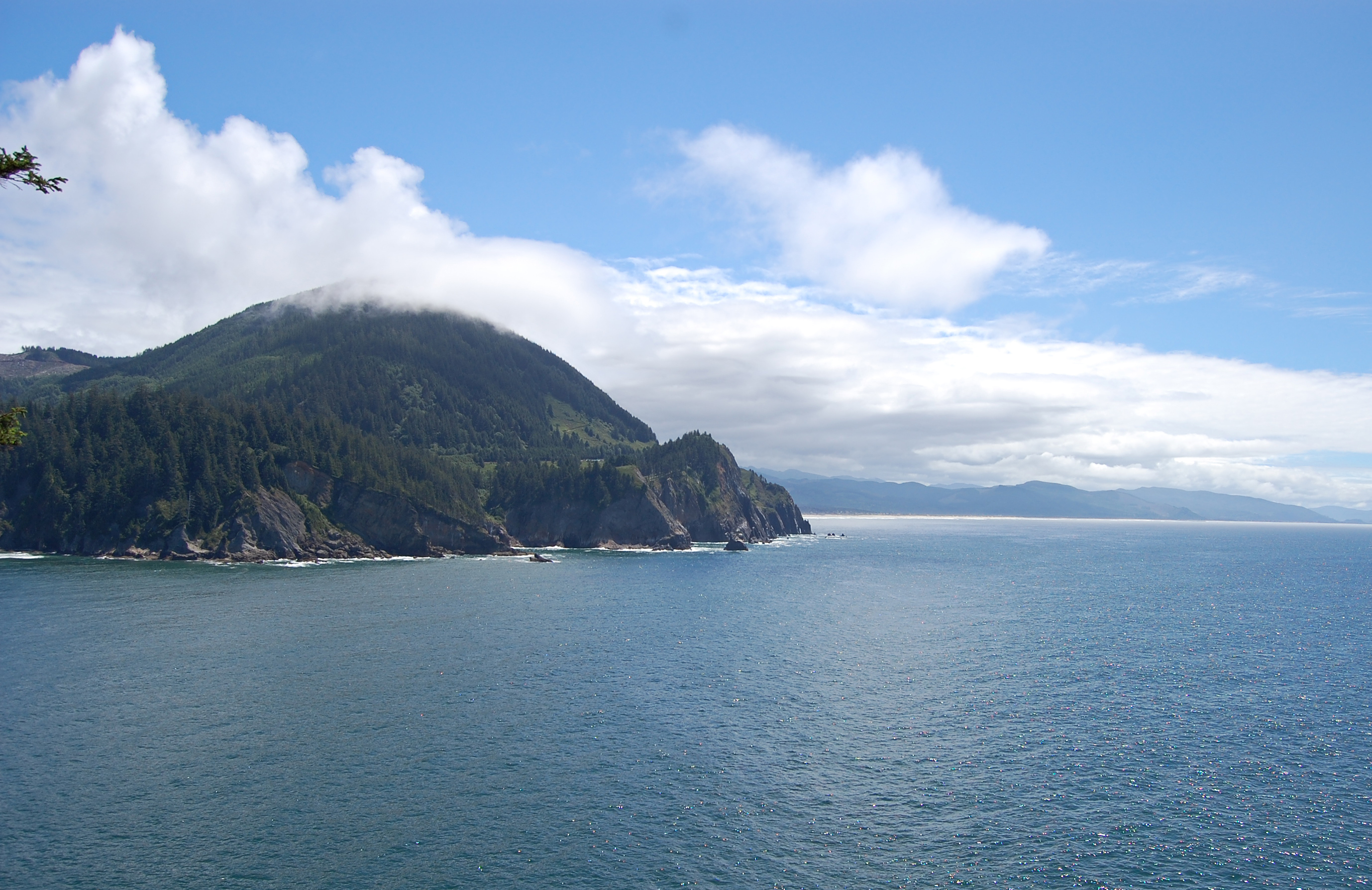
- Neahkahnie Mountain from the North.

Highest point
- Elevation: 1,683+ feet (513 m)
- Coordinates: 45°44′49″N 123°57′06″W

Naming
- English translation: The place of the supreme deity
- Language of name: Tillamook

Geography
- Location within Oregon
- Location: Tillamook County, Oregon, U.S.
- Parent range: Northern Oregon Coast Range
- Topo map: USGS Nehalem

Neahkahnie Mountain is a mountain, or headland, on the Oregon Coast, north of Manzanita in Oswald West State Park overlooking U.S. Route 101, that has a pass elevation of approximately 620 feet (190 m), which is the third highest point of the highway in Oregon. The peak is part of the Northern Oregon Coast Range, which is part of the Oregon Coast Range. It is best known for stories of Spanish treasure said to be buried either at the foot of the mountain, or on its slopes.

In earlier times, Native Americans would set fires to clear the mountain slopes so deer and elk would have tender vegetation to eat in the spring. Pioneers afterwards did the same so their cattle and sheep would have grass to graze on. Since at least 1990, however, this practice was discontinued and the slopes are heavily forested in many places.

The name comes from the Tillamook language, although according to Lewis A. McArthur, an Oregonian geographic historian, the meaning of the word is controversial. Neah-Kah-Nie (other spellings, although obsolescent include "Ne-a-karney" and Ne-kah-ni) is translated as "the place of the god", whose name has been transcribed as Acarna.

== History ==
A legend, dating back to the mid-1800s and the first Hudson's Bay Company employees to arrive in the area, claims the mountain conceals a lost treasure, hidden by Spanish sailors in the late 16th century. There are various versions of the legend, but the most common ones involve a group of sailors carrying a chest up the hillside, then digging a hole and lowering the treasure inside. As the story goes, one of the sailors then plunges his sword into one of the men with them, apparently an African slave, and his body was then thrown in on top of the treasure; the idea being, Native Americans would not disturb a man's grave, so keeping the treasure under a dead man would prevent the Native Americans—who, in most versions of the story were watching the activity closely from nearby—from digging it up.

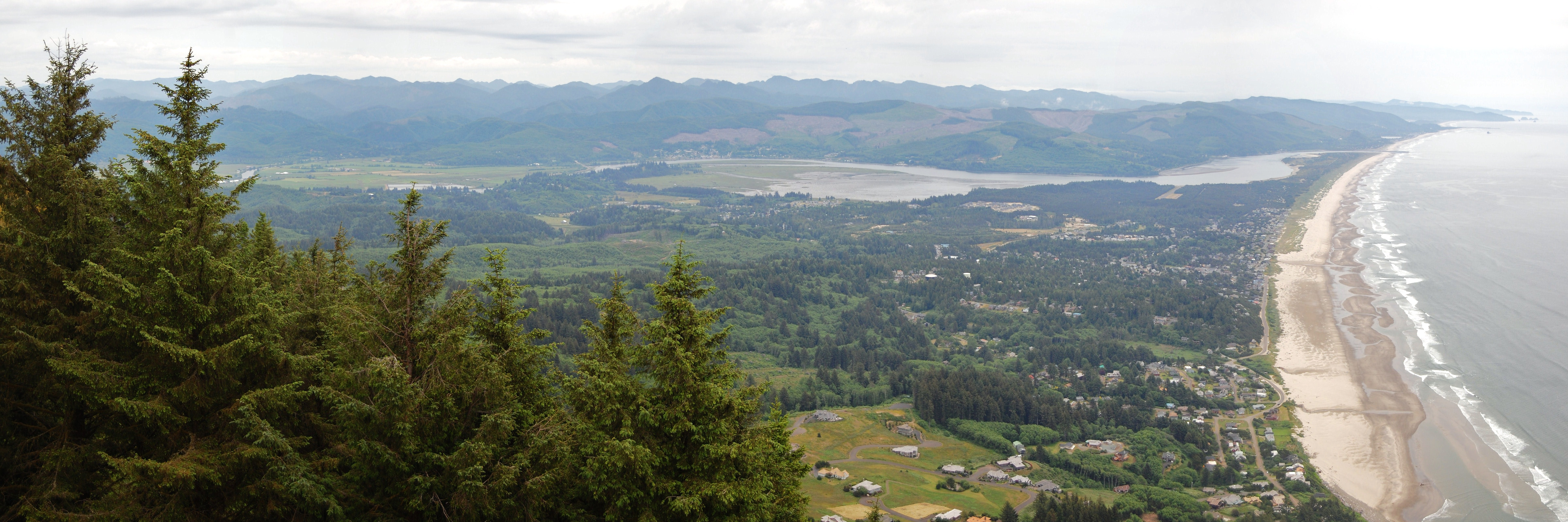
View of Manzanita and Nehalem Bay from Neahkanie Mountain

The "lost treasure," subject of the 2006 movie Tillamook Treasure, has been searched for by hundreds of people over the years, some resorting to earth-moving equipment and others digging by hand. During the 1930s, two treasure hunters died when their excavation caved in on them.

Digging for treasure is prohibited on the portions of the mountain that are in the control of the Oregon Parks and Recreation Department and is also prohibited on the beach, also part of the Oregon State parks. Some artifacts of possibly Spanish origin have been found on the mountain; notably, in the 1870s, a collection of stones with arrows marked on them and one with the letters D E W on it found by treasure hunter Pat Smith. Beeswax has been recovered from the beach along the southwest slopes of the mountain for years; as early as 1814 chunks were dug from the beach sands and taken for trade to a fur trader at Astoria. One slab, described as "closely resembling polished stone", has a cross with a circle at its center deeply carved on its surface. But no treasure or evidence of treasure is known to have been found.

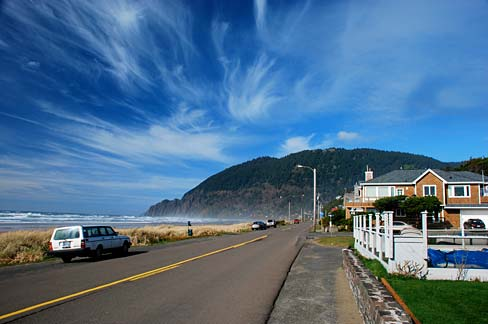
View of Neahkanie Mountain from Manzanita

Spanish ships might have come to the area by the 16th century. Ships using the Manila galleon trade route usually made landfall on the southern California coast, but it is possible some made landfall as far north as Oregon. The 1543 voyage of Juan Rodríguez Cabrillo reached California and, under Bartolomé Ferrelo, might have reached the Oregon coast. The 1774 voyage of Juan Pérez was the first European voyage to have unquestionably reached the Oregon coast. However, a Spanish ship almost certainly wrecked near the base of Mount Neahkahnie. Spanish archives list 33 ships as lost during the period of the Manila galleon. Five possible galleons from this list have been suggested as possible shipwrecks: the San Juanillo, lost in 1578 and discovered in the 21st century wrecked on the Baja peninsula; the San Juan, lost in 1586; the San Antonio, last heard from in 1603; the San Francisco Xavier, which sailed in 1705 and is known to carry beeswax; and the San Jose, which sailed from San Blas 16 June 1769. Ongoing research into the so-called Beeswax wreck has determined that the galleon was probably the Santo Cristo de Burgos, voyage of 1693.

Another theory for the inscribed stones was proposed by M. Wayne Jensen Jr., Director of the Tillamook County Pioneer Museum who thought it possible that they were from a cartographic survey of Francis Drake's 1579 New Albion claim.

== See also ==
- Neahkahnie Beach, Oregon
- Chief Kilchis
