= Nehalem =

Nehalem may refer to:

- Nehalem (people), or Tillamook, a Native American tribe
- Nehalem language, or Tillamook language, the language spoken by the Nehalem (Tillamook) tribe

== Places ==
=== Oregon, United States ===
- Nehalem Bay, a bay in Tillamook County
- Nehalem Bay State Airport, an airport near Nehalem Bay
- Nehalem Bay State Park, a state park which includes Nehalem Spit and Nehalem Beach
- Nehalem Highway, a state highway
- Nehalem, Oregon, a city in Tillamook County
- Nehalem River, a river

== Other uses ==
- Nehalem (microarchitecture), an Intel processor microarchitecture

== See also ==
- Tillamook (disambiguation)
