= Mary Frances Isom Cottage =

- U.S. National Register of Historic Places
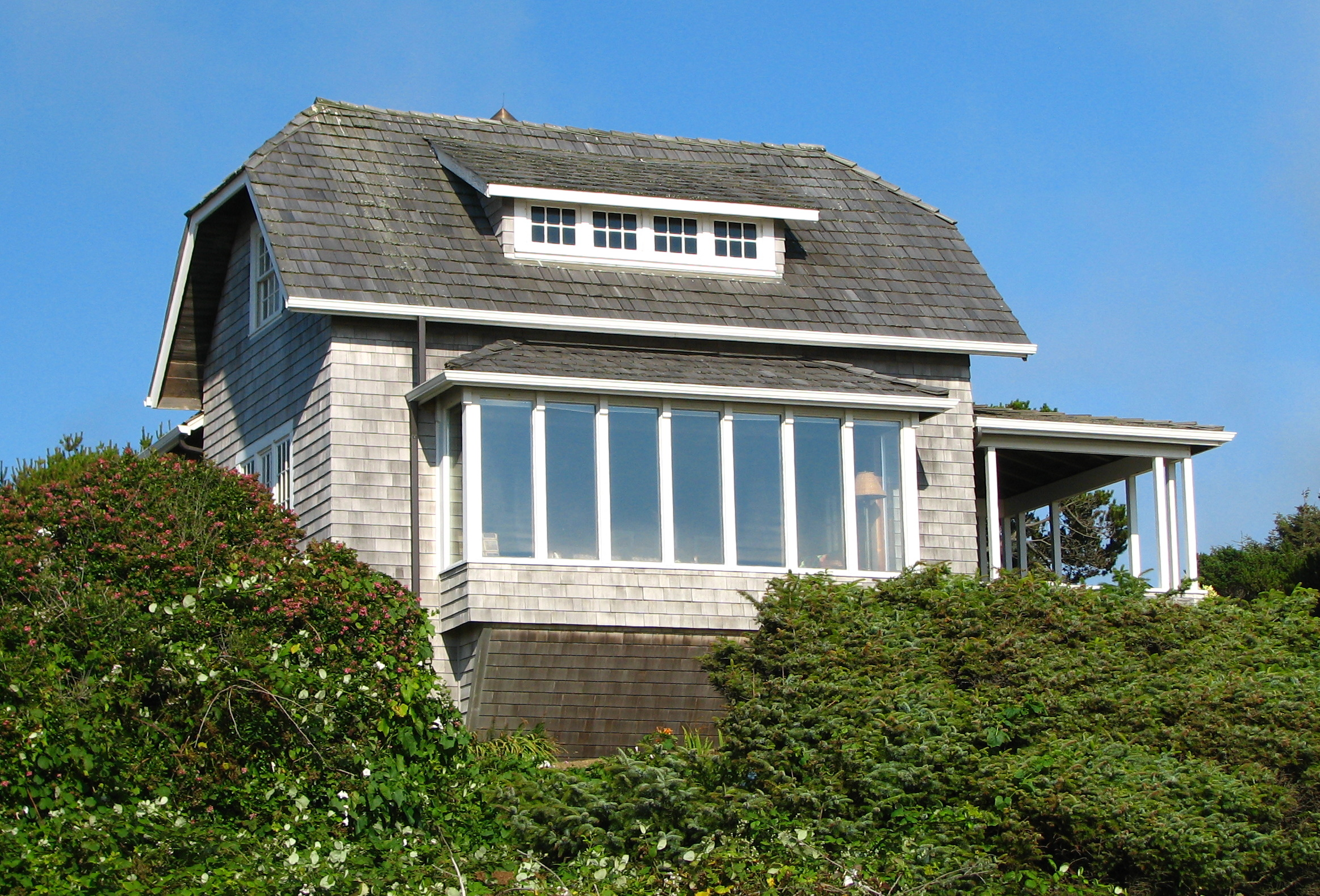
- Mary Frances Isom Cottage in July 2009

- Location within Oregon Location within the United States
- Nearest city: Manzanita, Oregon
- Coordinates: 45°43′43″N 123°56′34″W
- Area: 0.2 acres (0.081 ha)
- Built: 1912
- Built by: F.P. Humke
- Architect: Albert E. Doyle
- Architectural style: Late 19th and Early 20th Century American Movements, Arts and Crafts
- NRHP reference No.: 91000065
- Added to NRHP: February 19, 1991

Mary Frances Isom Cottage ("Spindrift") is a house in Neahkahnie Beach, Oregon, in the United States, included on the National Register of Historic Places. The cottage was designed by American architect A. E. Doyle for the head librarian of the Library Association of Portland, Mary Frances Isom.

== See also ==
- National Register of Historic Places listings in Tillamook County, Oregon
