= Harry F. Wentz Studio =

Historic house in Oregon, United States

- U.S. National Register of Historic Places
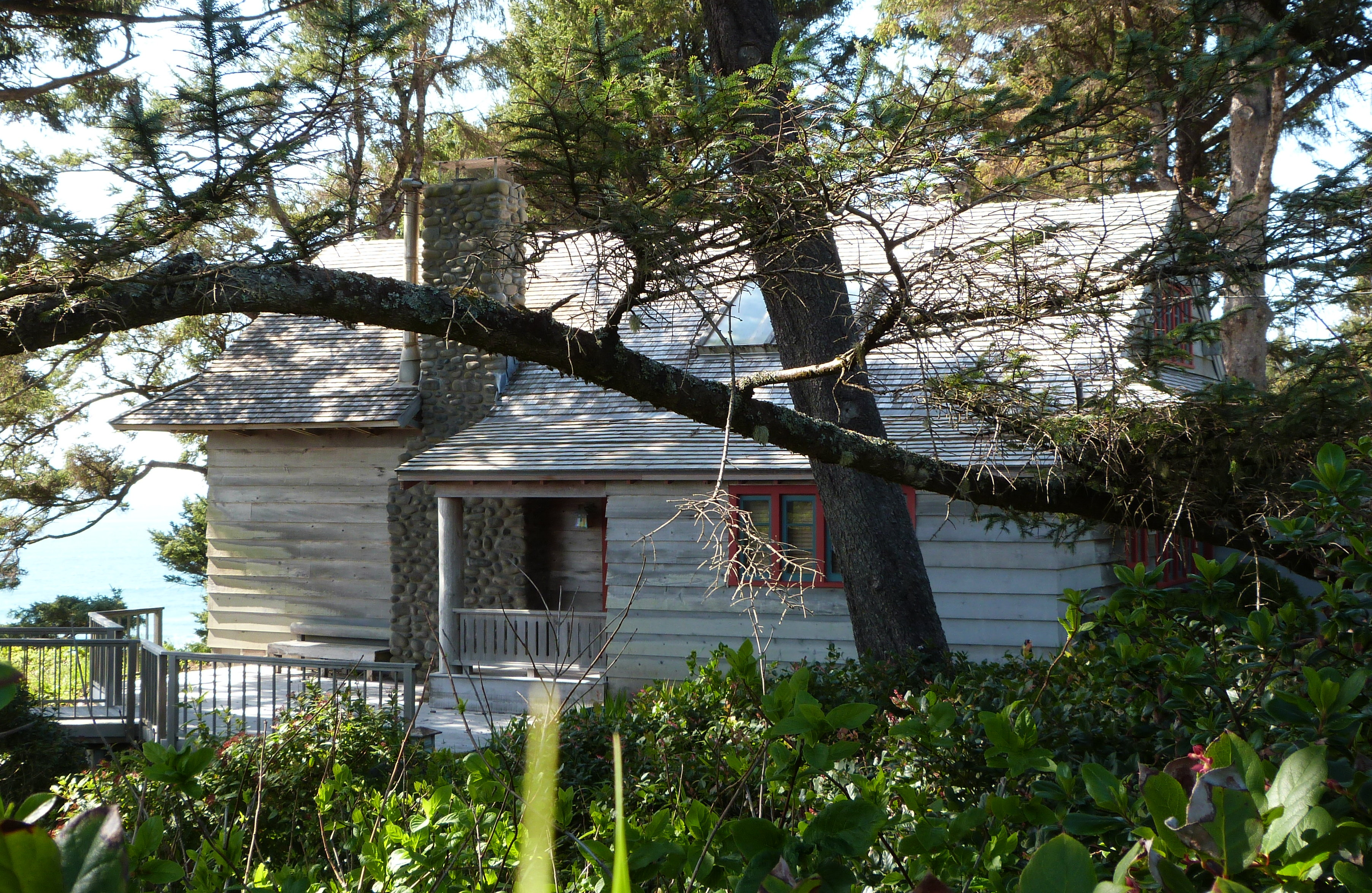
- The Wentz Studio in 2015
- Location: Neahkahnie, Oregon
- Nearest city: Manzanita, Oregon
- Coordinates: 45°44′00″N 123°56′41″W
- Built: ca. 1916
- Built by: Harry F. Wentz, Local builder Hurnkle
- Architect: A. E. Doyle, Harry F. Wentz
- Architectural style: Northwest Regional style
- NRHP reference No.: 76001589
- Added to NRHP: April 22, 1976

The Harry F. Wentz Studio, also known as the Harry F. Wentz Studio-Bungalow and Studio Neah-Kah-Nie, is a historic house located in the Neahkahnie community near Manzanita, Oregon, United States. Designed by artist Harry F. Wentz and architect A. E. Doyle and built circa 1916, this bungalow came to be regarded as a prototype of the Northwest Regional style of architecture. Some of the characteristic features of the house include: colors and materials associated with the Northwest, especially timber; low massing with simple wall surfaces; porches with slender wooden supports; and siting to harmonize with the surrounding landscape. The style was later more fully developed by John Yeon and Doyle's colleague Pietro Belluschi.

The house was added to the National Register of Historic Places in 1976.

== See also ==
- National Register of Historic Places listings in Tillamook County, Oregon
