= Pine Grove Community House =

Historic building in Manzanita, Oregon, U.S.

- U.S. National Register of Historic Places
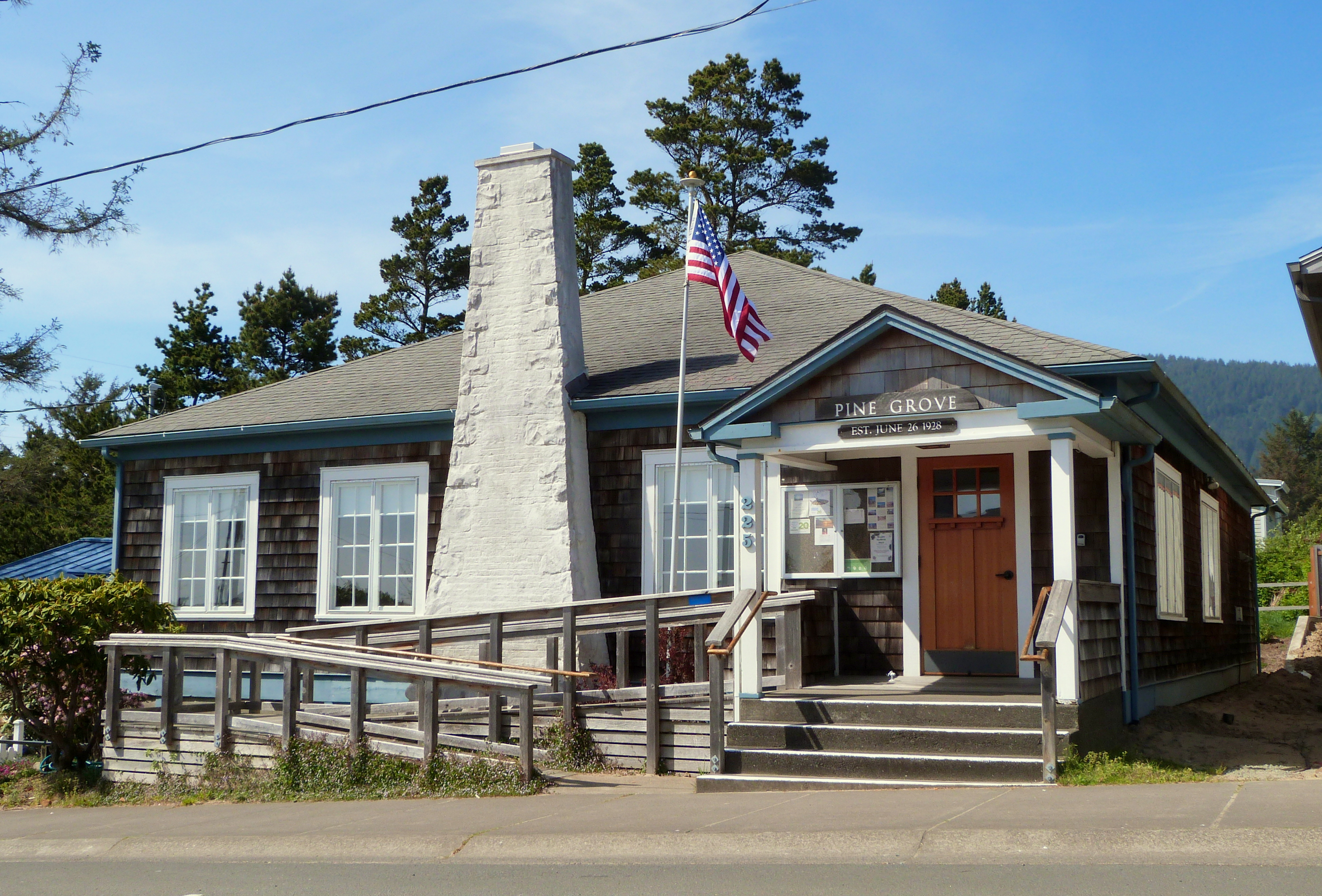
- Building exterior in 2017
- Location: Manzanita, Oregon
- Coordinates: 45.718664°N 123.936601°W
- Built: 1933
- NRHP reference No.: 100001276
- Added to NRHP: 2017

The Pine Grove Community House in Manzanita, Oregon, United States, was completed in 1933 and added to the National Register of Historic Places on July 3, 2017.

== See also ==
- National Register of Historic Places listings in Tillamook County, Oregon
