= A. E. Doyle Cottage =

Historic house in Oregon, United States

- U.S. National Register of Historic Places
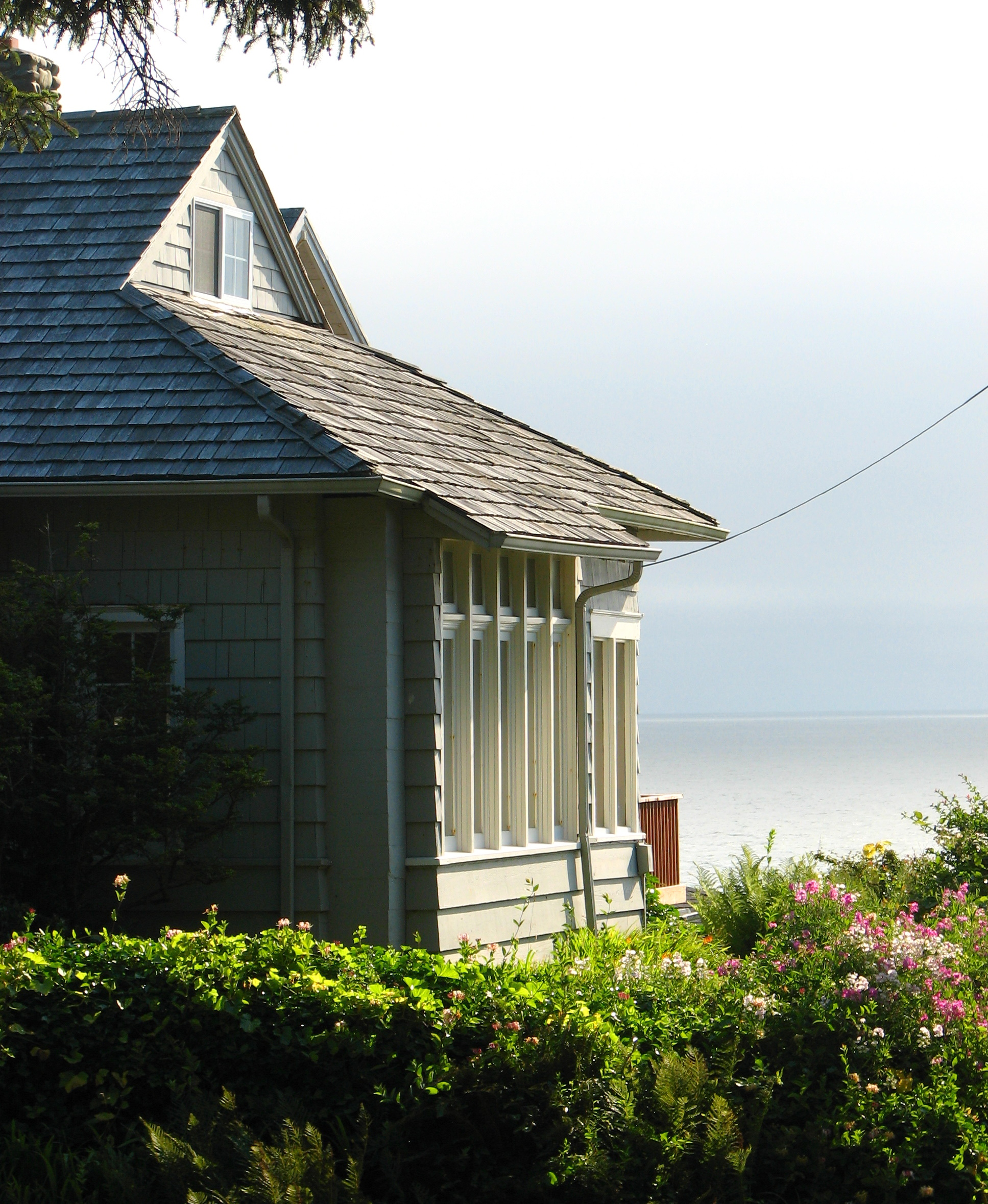
- The A. E. Doyle Cottage in 2009
- Location: 37480 2nd Street; Neahkahnie Beach, Oregon
- Nearest city: Nehalem, Oregon
- Coordinates: 45°43′45″N 123°56′30″W
- Area: 0.2 acres (0.081 ha)
- Built: 1915
- Built by: F. P. Humke
- Architect: A. E. Doyle
- Architectural style: Arts and Crafts
- NRHP reference No.: 91000066
- Added to NRHP: February 19, 1991

The A. E. Doyle Cottage is a historic house in Neahkahnie Beach, Oregon, United States. It was designed by American architect A. E. Doyle.

The cottage was listed on the National Register of Historic Places in 1991.

== See also ==
- National Register of Historic Places listings in Tillamook County, Oregon
