= Tillamook =

Tillamook may refer to:

Places:

- Tillamook County, Oregon, United States
- Tillamook, Oregon, a city, the seat of Tillamook County

Other:

- Tillamook people, a Native American tribe of western Oregon, United States
- Tillamook language, an extinct language
- Tillamook Burn, a series of forest fires in Oregon
- Tillamook Cheddar (dog), an American Jack Russell terrier known for her paintings
- Tillamook County Creamery Association, makers of dairy products sold under the "Tillamook" brand name
- P55C, Tillamook, a family of Pentium MMX mobile computer processors from Intel
- USS Tillamook, the name of more than one United States Navy ship

== See also ==
- Nehalem (disambiguation), another name for the Tillamook people
