= Coast Guard Station Tillamook Bay =

US Coast Guard station in Oregon

- U.S. Coast Guard Station – Tillamook Bay
- U.S. National Register of Historic Places
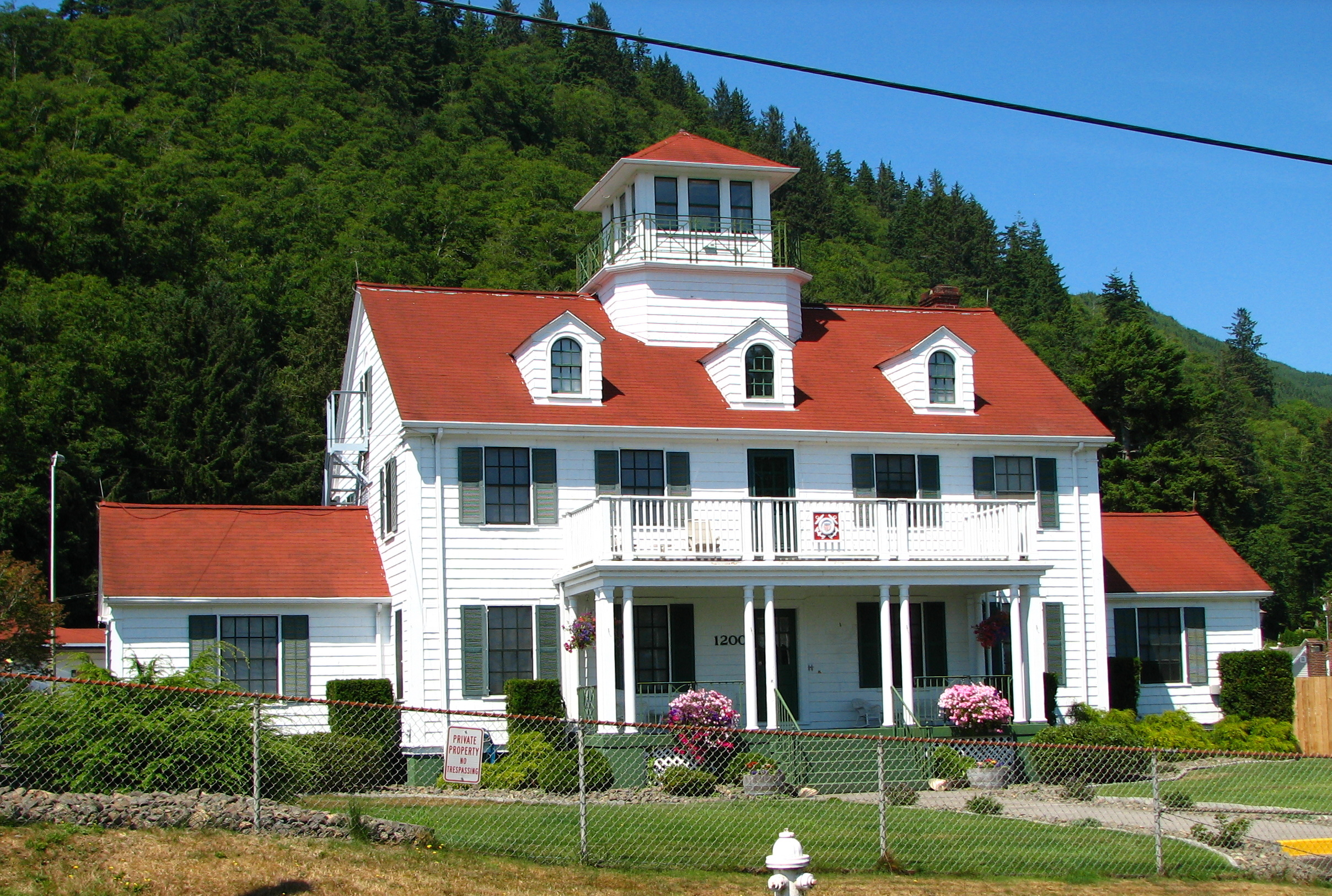
- The main building of CGS Tillamook Bay is a nationally registered historic site.

- Location within Oregon Location within the United States
- Location: U.S. Route 101; Garibaldi, Oregon
- Coordinates: 45°33′31″N 123°55′13″W
- Area: 3.3 acres (1.3 ha)
- Built: 1942
- Built by: U.S. Coast Guard
- Architectural style: Colonial Revival
- NRHP reference No.: 93001337
- Added to NRHP: December 10, 1993

Coast Guard Station Tillamook Bay is an active duty installation of the United States Coast Guard located in Garibaldi, Oregon, as well as a nationally recognized historic site. A station has been operating in Tillamook Bay since 1908. The station was opened by the United States Life-saving Service a precursor agency to the Coast Guard. The current station has been in continuous operation since 1942.

In 1909 station crew rescued the complement of the coastal steamer Argo.

Over the July 4th weekend of 1980 Richard Dixon, the coxswain of a 44-foot Motor Lifeboat from the station was awarded the unusual honor of two Coast Guard Medals, for leading two daring rescues.

The station was entered onto the National Register of Historic Places in 1993.

== See also ==
- National Register of Historic Places listings in Tillamook County, Oregon
