= Cronin Point Site =

- Cronin Point Site (35TI4)
- U.S. National Register of Historic Places
- Location: Address restricted (Note: Federal and state laws and practices restrict general public access to information regarding the specific location of this resource. In some cases, this is to protect archeological sites from vandalism, while in other cases it is restricted at the request of the owner.)
- Nearest city: Manzanita, Oregon
- Area: 2.2 acres (0.89 ha)
- MPS: Native American Archeological Sites of the Oregon Coast MPS
- NRHP reference No.: 01000128
- Added to NRHP: March 6, 2001

The Cronin Point Site (Smithsonian trinomial: 35TI4) is an archeological site located in Nehalem Bay State Park near Manzanita, Oregon, United States, that was occupied probably between 1600 and 1800 CE. The site is characterized by a significant quantity of burned, fire-cracked rock, indicating the presence of hearths and other cultural activities associated with occupation and a possible village site. Artifacts in the site include stone flaking debris, and a smaller number of projectile points, glass pieces, bone pieces, and shell fragments. Notably, the site also includes shards of Chinese and Japanese ceramicware, datable by their design to ca. 1550–1680 CE, which link the Cronin Point Site to the Nehalem Beeswax Shipwreck. (Note: The Beeswax Shipwreck was a Spanish ship engaged in the Manila–Acapulco trade in the 17th or 18th century. Its wreck while en route to New Spain introduced large quantities of beeswax, along with other items such as ceramics, into Native American trade along the Oregon Coast for a century or more afterward.) The site spans both submerged and exposed areas; auger-based studies suggest that occupation of the site ended abruptly, likely when the land it rests on subsided due to a large earthquake.

Further study of the Cronin Point Site has potential to yield information related to the "protohistoric" period of sporadic contact between Native Americans and Europeans, prior to the intensive interactions of cross-continental trade and emigration. It may also shed light of the impact of seismic events on the peoples and environments of the Oregon Coast. Other potential research questions relate to environmental change in the Oregon Coast region, settlement and subsistence patterns, emergence of ethnographic patterns among coastal people, changes in cultural patterns around contact with European Americans, and other topics.

The Cronin Point Site was listed on the National Register of Historic Places in 2001.

== See also ==
- National Register of Historic Places listings in Tillamook County, Oregon
