= Mary Frances Isom =

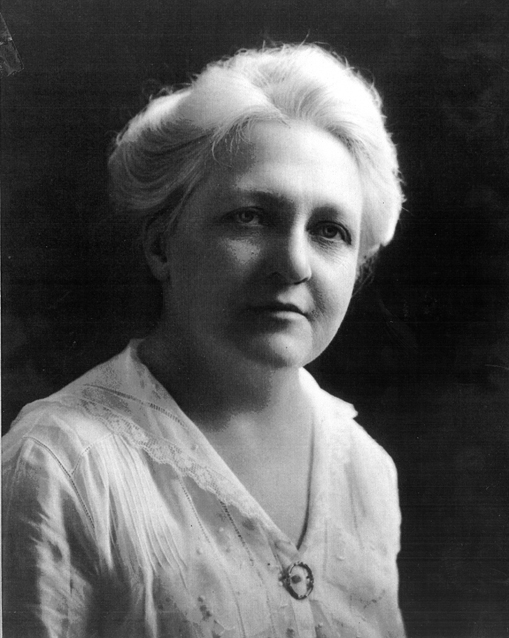
- Born: February 27, 1865; Nashville, Tennessee
- Died: April 15, 1920 (aged 55); Portland, Oregon

Academic background
- Education: Pratt Institute

Academic work
- Main interests: Librarian

Mary Frances Isom (February 27, 1865 – April 15, 1920) was a librarian, and one of the founders of the Oregon Library Association, the Pacific Northwest Library Association and the Oregon State Library Commission. She was instrumental in the formerly private Portland Library Association being opened to the public as what is now the Central Library Building in Portland.

== Biography ==
Mary Isom was born in Nashville, Tennessee in 1865 to Dr. John Franklin Isom and Frances A. Isom. Her family was originally from Cleveland, and returned there after the Civil War. She went to Wellesley for one year, but her college was interrupted at the end of that year so she could return to Cleveland to care for her father. When her father died in 1899, she enrolled at the library program at Pratt Institute at the advice of her friend Josephine Rathbone, who was then a faculty member there. Isom received her degree there two years later.

Shortly after she graduated, she was hired as a cataloger at the Library Association of Portland. The association had just received a gift from the philanthropist John Wilson of his entire collection of over 8,000 books, but it came with the stipulation that the collection must be made freely available to the public. The association needed a cataloger to help make these books accessible while they were making the final decisions on how their currently private association would go public. By 1902, Isom had taken over as the head librarian of the association and was overseeing its transformation from a subscription-based private library to a tax-funded public institution for all of Portland. One year later it had become the library for all of Multnomah County. This was in part due to Isom's lobbying of the Legislature to expand the law, as she did not feel that only city residents should be able to access libraries. In 1905, she drafted a bill to create the Oregon Library Commission, which became the Oregon State Library in 1913. She recruited Cornelia Marvin of the Wisconsin Free Library Commission to run the Oregon Library Commission, as she wished to model her state's commission on Wisconsin's.

When the Central Library Building was constructed in 1912, Isom worked closely with the architect Albert E. Doyle to ensure that the building was efficient for its purpose as a library as well as picturesque. Isom was active within the American Library Association (ALA) as well, drawing it to hold its national conference in Portland in 1905.

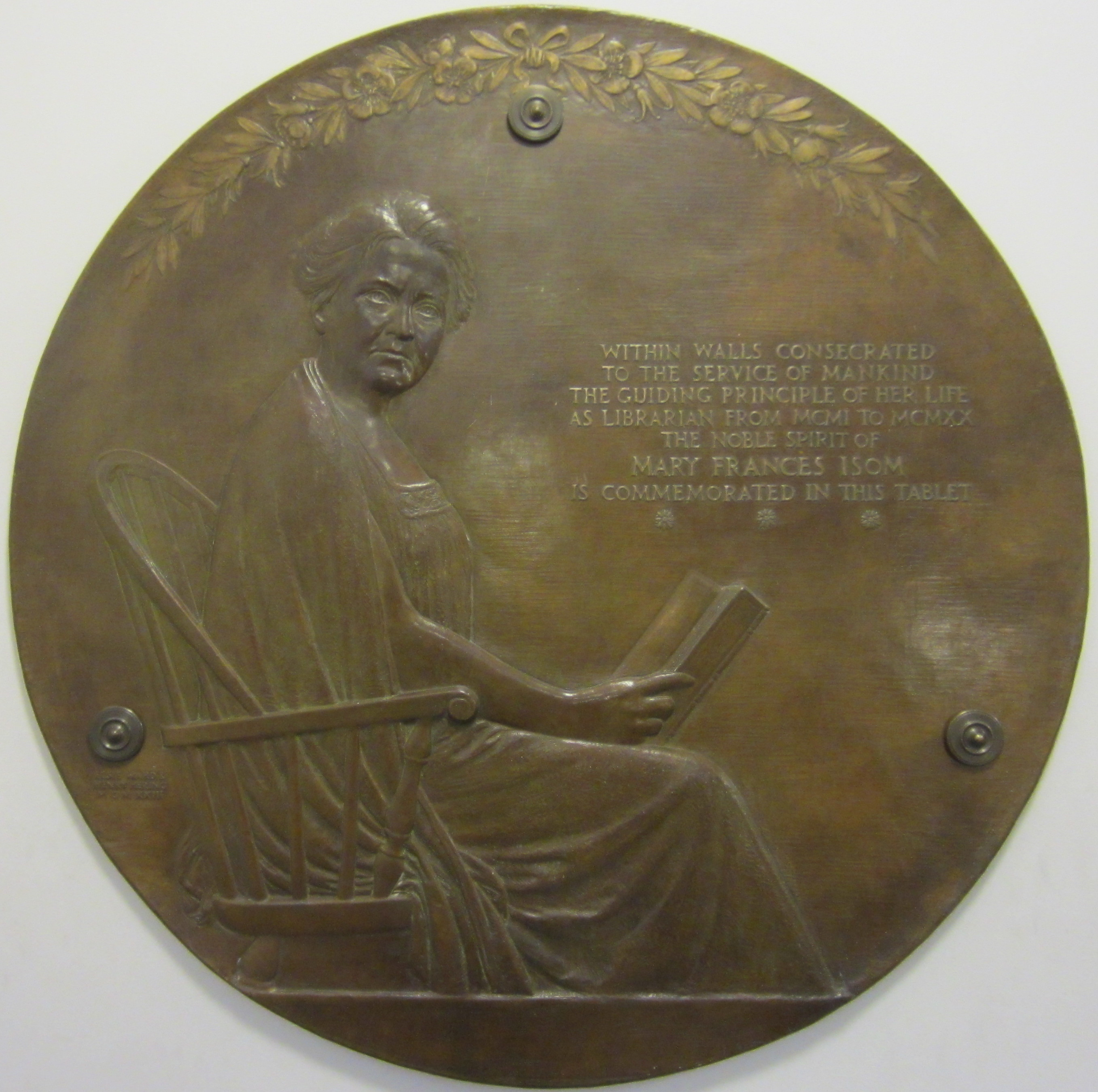
Mary Frances Isom bronze tablet inside Portland Central Library

In 1917, she participated in Liberty Bond Drives and organized hospital and camp libraries in Oregon and Washington. However, a county commissioner rallied an attack against one of her librarians, M. Louise Hunt, for refusing to buy Liberty Bonds as it conflicted with her pacifist beliefs. Isom stood by her employee's right to practice her conscience but in the face of continuing criticism, the librarian wound up resigning. However, the Library Board did censure the county commissioner's behavior and attacks on both Mary Isom and the library, a courageous move considering that the county commission determined the library's tax rate.

Upon her return to the U.S. in April 1919, she discovered that the recurring pain in her left arm was a sign of cancer that would shortly take her life; she died in Portland, on April 15, 1920. In her will, she bequeathed $5,000 to the Directors of the Library Association of Portland in order that her employees receive pensions. In addition, though she left her cottage Spindrift to her adopted daughter Berenice Langton, Langton offered the use of the cottage to the Library Association, later giving it to the association outright in 1935 to be used for the rest and recreation of library staff.

A bronze tablet with her likeness is displayed in the stairway at the Central Library, and the organization's main administration building until 2022 was named in her honor.
