= U.S. Post Office (Tillamook, Oregon) =

Historic building in Tillamook, Oregon, U.S.

- US Post Office
- U.S. National Register of Historic Places
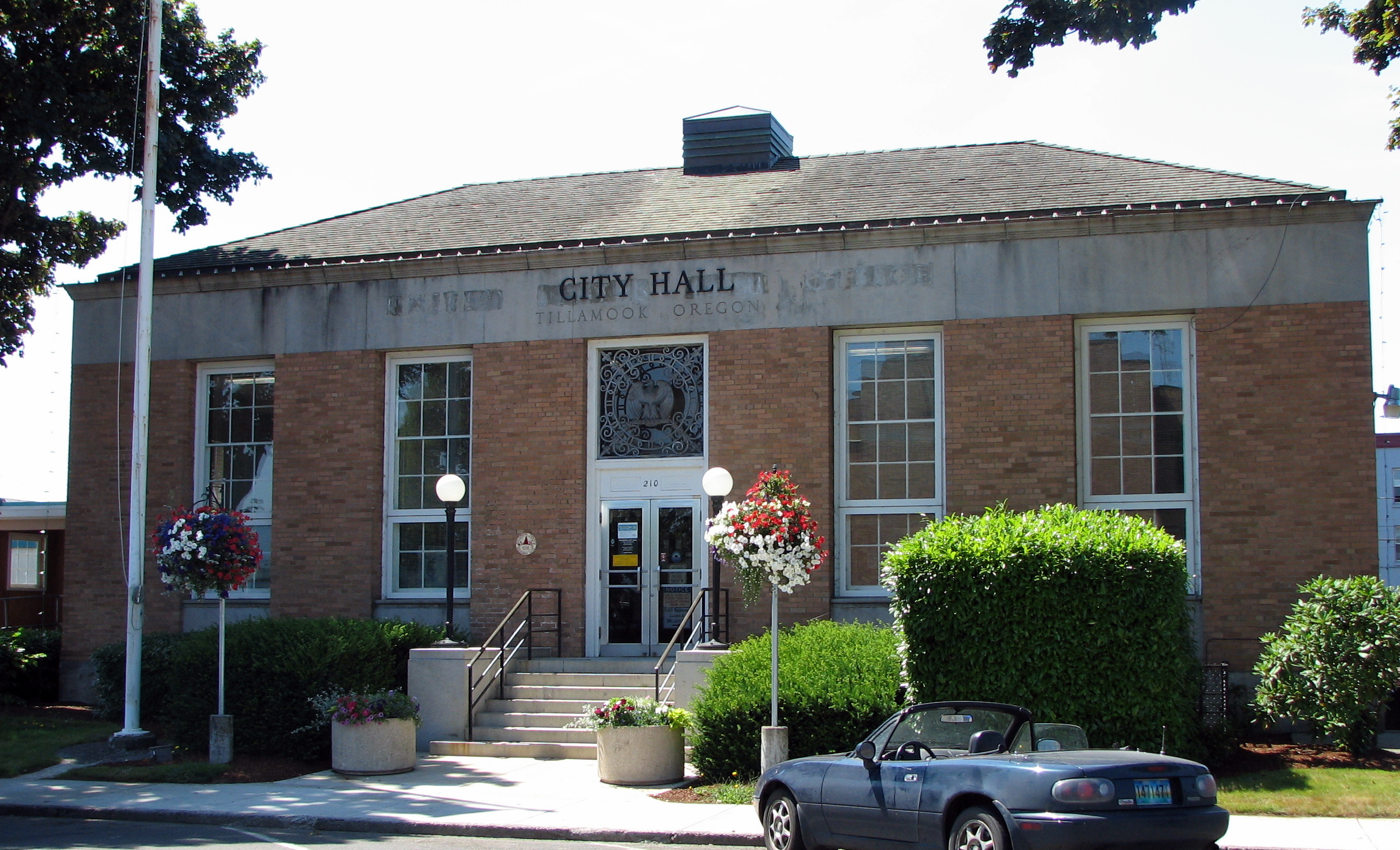
- The building's exterior in 2009
- Interactive map showing the location of U.S Post Office Tillamook
- Location: 210 Laurel Ave., Tillamook, Oregon
- Coordinates: 45.4567°N 123.8422°W
- Area: 0.5 acres (0.20 ha)
- Built: 1941
- Architect: Office of the Supervising Architect under Louis A. Simon
- Mural artist: Lucia Wiley
- Architectural style: Classical Revival
- MPS: Significant US Post Offices in Oregon 1900-1941 TR
- NRHP reference No.: 85000546
- Added to NRHP: March 1, 1985

The city hall of Tillamook, Oregon, located at 210 Laurel Avenue, was originally built as a post office, and is listed on the National Register of Historic Places.

== See also ==
- List of United States post offices
- National Register of Historic Places listings in Tillamook County, Oregon
