= Nehalem Bay State Airport =

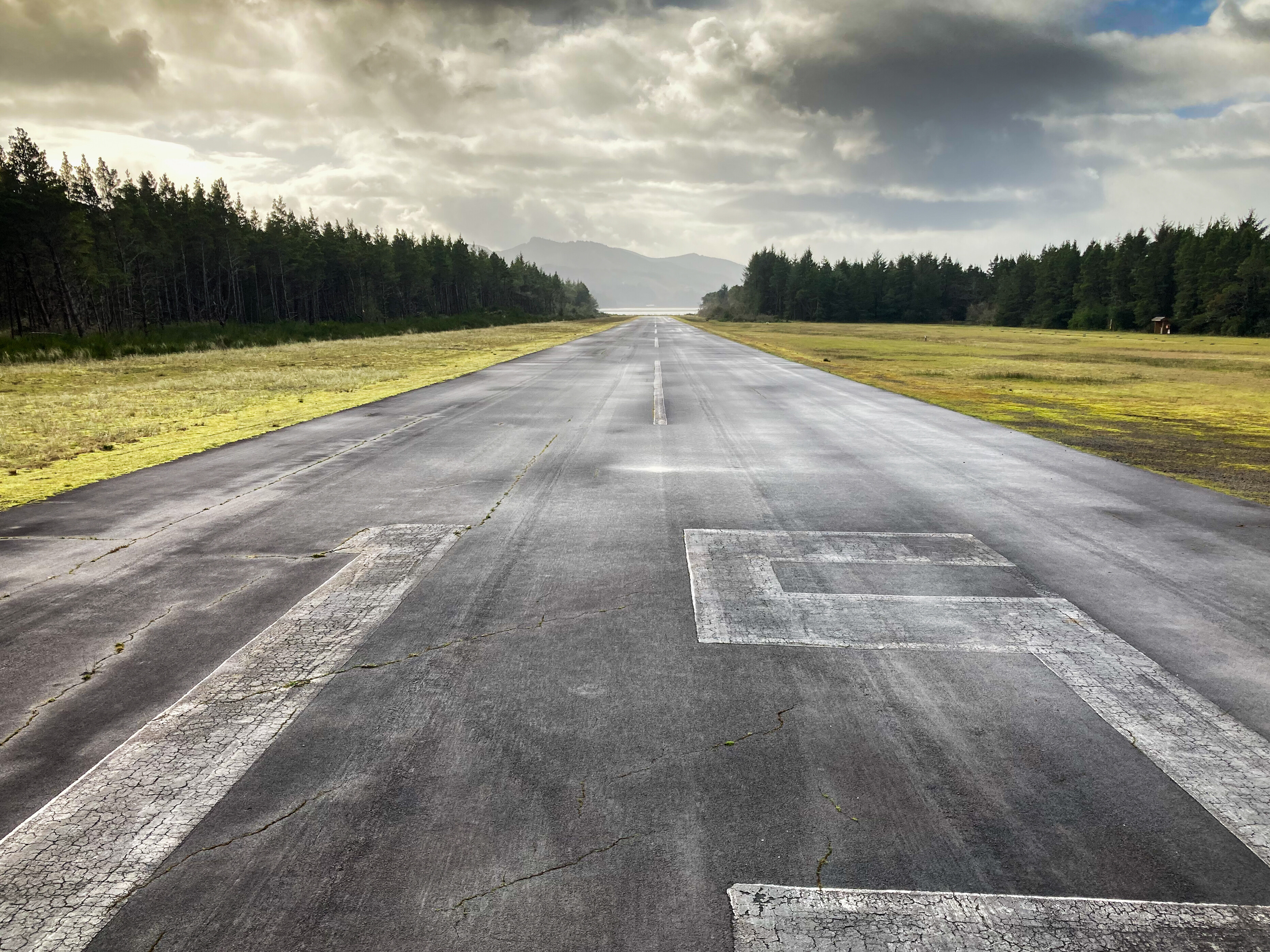
- Runway 15 at Nehalem Bay State Airport
- IATA: none; ICAO: none; FAA LID: 3S7

Summary
- Airport type: Public
- Owner: Oregon Dept. of Aviation
- Operator: Oregon Department of Aviation
- Serves: Manzanita, Oregon
- Location: Manzanita, Oregon
- Elevation AMSL: 30 ft / 9 m
- Coordinates: 45°41′53.3820″N 123°55′47.48″W
- Interactive map of Nehalem Bay State Airport

Runways
| Direction | Length | | Surface |
| Direction | ft | m | Surface |
|---|---|---|---|
| 15/33 | 2,350 | 716 | Asphalt |

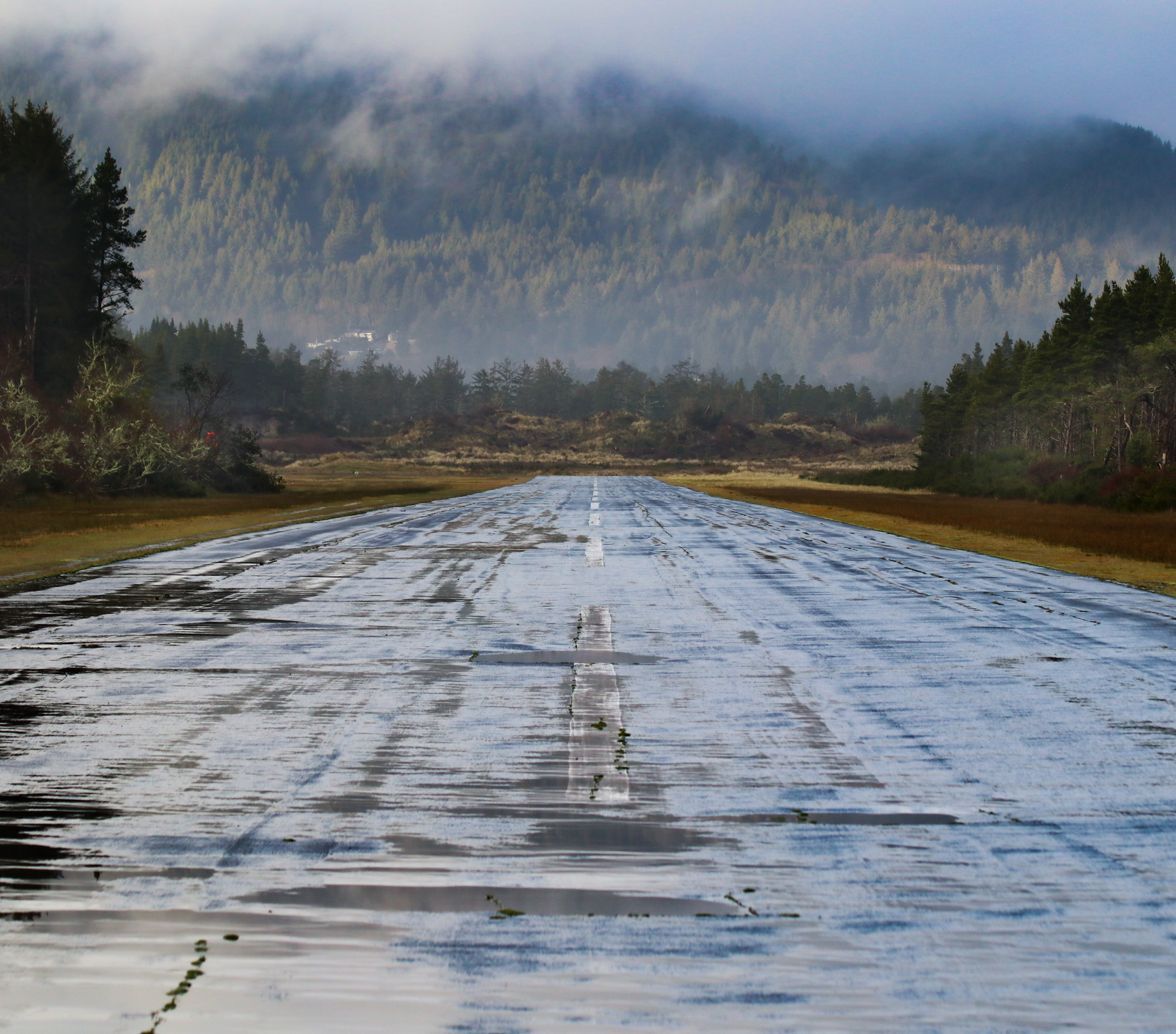
Runway 33 after a storm

Nehalem Bay State Airport (FAA LID: 3S7) is a public airport located two miles (3.2 km) southeast of Manzanita in Tillamook County, Oregon, United States.

The airport is located within the boundaries of Nehalem Bay State Park. It offers several campsites for fly-in camping, a few meters away from the tiedown area. About a ten-minute walk to the north is the town of Manzanita, offering dining and lodging.

== Specifications ==
| Category | Data for 3S7 |
|---|---|
| Status | Operational |
| Access Type | Public |
| Activation Date | January 1961 |
| Control tower? | No |
| Windsock? | Yes - Not Lit |
| Taxiway Surface | Grass/Gravel |
| Runways | 1 (15/33) |
| Runway Surface | Asphalt - Good Condition (2023) |
| Runway Width | 50 feet (15 meters) |
| Runway Length | 2350 feet (716 meters) |
| Runway Markings | Basic - Fair Condition (2023) |
| Responsible ARTCC | ZSE (Seattle) |
| Traffic Pattern Altitude MSL | 1030 feet (314 meters) |
| Airport Elevation AMSL | 30 feet (9 meters) |
| Magnetic Variation | 15.1E (WMM2020 model as of 2023) |
| FAA Region | ANM |
| NOTAMs Facility | MMV |
| Yearly Ops. (2020) | 2310 |
| CTAF | 122.900 |

== See also ==
- Nehalem Bay
