= Chief Kilchis =

Kilchis ([gə́lšəs] or [gə́lčəs] in Tillamook) or ( [ɡeǀtʃəs] in IPA) (c. 1806–1866) was one of the last free chiefs of the Tillmook. He lived during the 19th century near Tillamook Bay, Oregon.

Chief Kilchis and Chief Illga (also known as Tse-tse-no or Illga Adams) were the last Tillamook leaders to preside uncontested in the Tillamook's homeland around Tillamook Bay.

Kilchis may have been a descendant of one of the survivors of a Spanish Manila Galleon that wrecked near Neahkahnie Mountain and the mouth of the Nehalem River. Known as the beeswax wreck, it was probably the Santo Cristo de Burgos, which was lost in 1693 while sailing from the Philippines to Mexico. Warren Vaughn, an early white settler in Tillamook, knew Kilchis and believed he was a descendant of one of the survivors of the wreck, and said that Kilchis himself claimed such ancestry. Kilchis was described by many people as looking strikingly different from other native Tillamook people. Many assumed he was partially of sub-Saharan African ancestry, having curly hair and beard, and other features settlers saw as African. There are various stories about his supposed ancestry. Warren Vaughn claimed that Kilchis's father was a "full-blooded negro" who had been a blacksmith on the "wax-ship" and had been taken in into the Tillamook tribe. Kilchis's mother was, according to Vaughn, a Nehalem Tillamook woman who had married the blacksmith survivor. Vaughn did not know when the "wax-ship" wrecked. If it was the Spanish galleon of 1693 then Kilchis's father could not have been one of the survivors, but a more distant ancestor could have been.

Chief Kilchis appears in the historical novel Trask by Don Berry, in which he is described as "part-negro".

American settlers began encroaching on Tillamook land after the 1850 Donation Land Claim Act, which encouraged American homesteading in Oregon Territory. During the 1850s white settlers literally crowded the Tillamooks off their beaches and many conflicts occurred. Chief Kilchis and Chief Illga met with the settlers Elbridge Trask and Warren Vaughn to negotiate peace, but conflict continued intermittently.

Anson Dart, the Oregon Superintendent of Indian Affairs, tried to make land cession treaties with the Tillamook under Kilchis, and the Nehalem people, and many others. The treaty with Kilchis of August 7, 1851, went unratified. Dart's successor, Joel Palmer, was able to make new treaties, which were ratified, to acquire large amounts of native land, including the Tillamook land. During the many inter-related Indian wars of the 1850s, such as the Yakima War and Rogue River Wars, Kilchis was pressured by the Klickitat people to join the fight, but the Tillamook obeyed Kilchis's order that they remain peaceful and demonstrate their peaceful intentions to the whites.

In 1856, after the wars, the Tillamook people were forced to move to the Coast Indian Reservation (today called the Siletz Reservation), becoming part of the Confederated Tribes of Siletz Indians.
