= Oswald West State Park =

State park in Oregon, United States

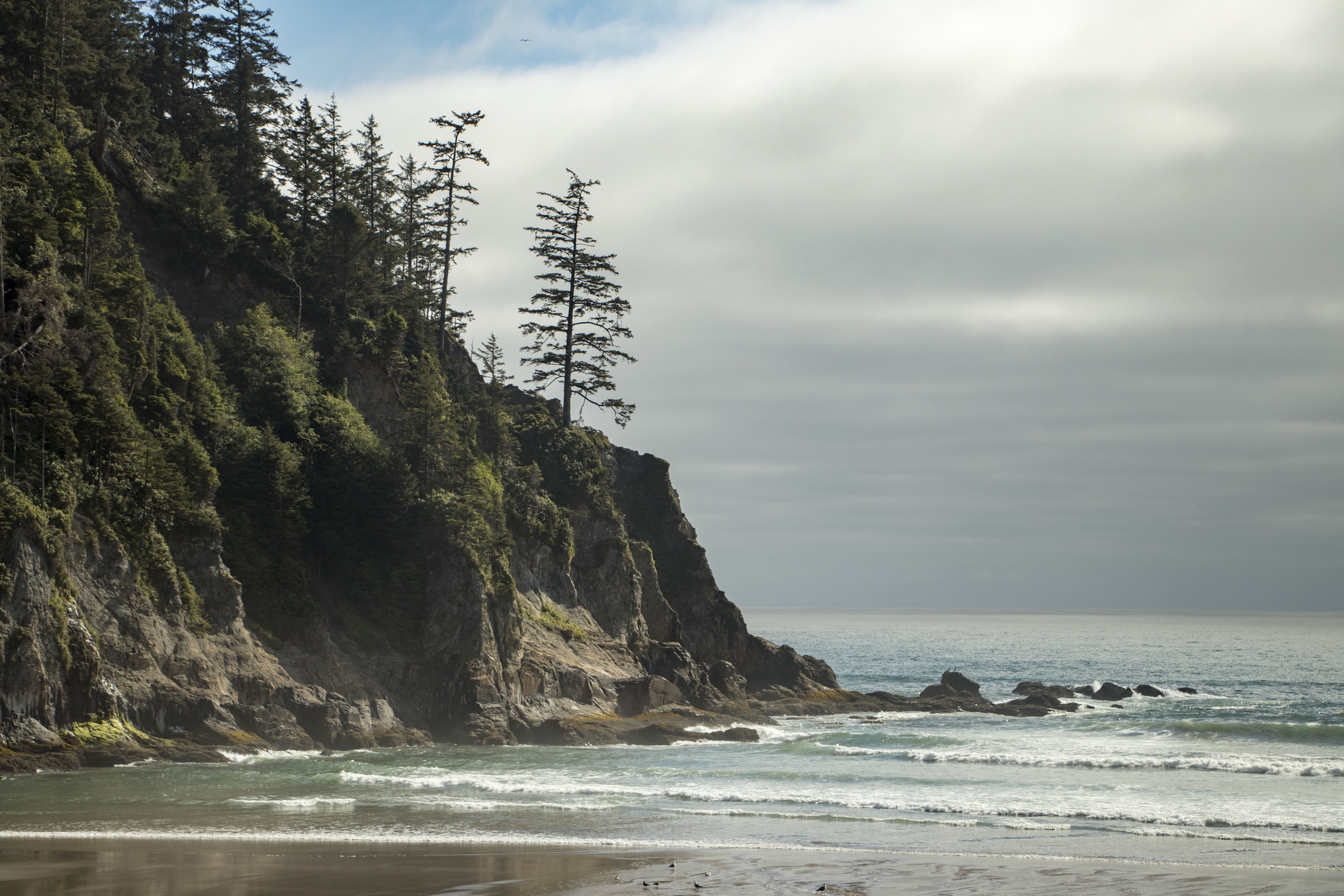

- Location within Oregon Location within the United States
- Type: Public, state
- Location: Tillamook County, Oregon
- Nearest city: Manzanita
- Coordinates: 45°46′11″N 123°57′35″W
- Area: 2,448 acres (9.91 km^{2})
- Operator: Oregon Parks and Recreation Department

Oswald West State Park is part of the state park system of the U.S. state of Oregon. It is located about 10 miles (16 km) south of the city of Cannon Beach, adjacent to Arch Cape, on the Pacific Ocean. The park covers 2,448 acres (9.91 km^{2}), with many miles of hiking trails both inside the park grounds and linking to other parks and landmarks beyond.

The state park also contains Neahkahnie Mountain, Short Sand Beach, Short Sand Creek, Necarney Creek, Cape Falcon, Smugglers Cove and the Oregon Coast Trail. The cove is a popular surf destination and is known as "Short Sands".

== History ==
The park was named after Oswald West, the 14th Governor of Oregon and the man who led preserving Oregon's beaches for public use. A memorial marker for Matt Kramer, a journalist whose articles helped shift public opinion to preserve the beaches, sits at the trail divide between Short Sands beach and Cape Falcon.

== Marine reserve ==
On January 1, 2016, the Cape Falcon Marine Reserve and Marine Protected Area went into effect off the shores of Oswald West State Park. The marine reserve includes the nearshore out to approximately 2 miles out into the ocean. The following activities are unlawful to undertake in the marine reserve: Take of any fish, invertebrate, or wildlife species; Take of kelp or other seaweeds; and Deployment of fishing gear. The marine protected area is the two miles out through the state waters line (3 nautical miles out). The restrictions are the same, except people may take salmon by troll and crab.

== Camping ==
Oswald West is currently a day-use area only, though the park historically had 30 walk-in tent sites. The campsite was surrounded by giant old-growth Sitka spruce, Douglas-fir, western hemlock and western red cedar, as well as smaller brush including red huckleberry, salmonberry and salal bushes.

During the Summer of 2008, a large Sitka Spruce fell with no warning in the campground. The state immediately conducted a survey of other trees in the park and determined there were several other trees that could fall at any moment. Subsequently, the Oregon Parks and Recreation Department decided to close the campground indefinitely citing public safety. Although camping is currently not permitted, the park is still open with full day-use access.

== Gallery ==
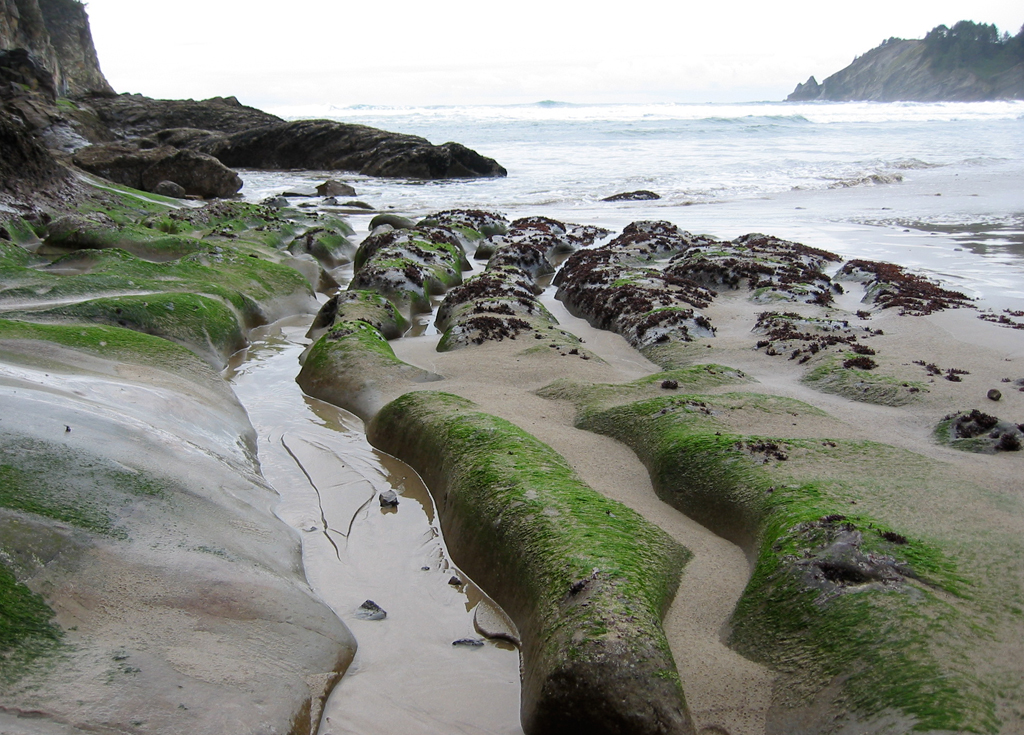
Rock formations at Smuggler Cove

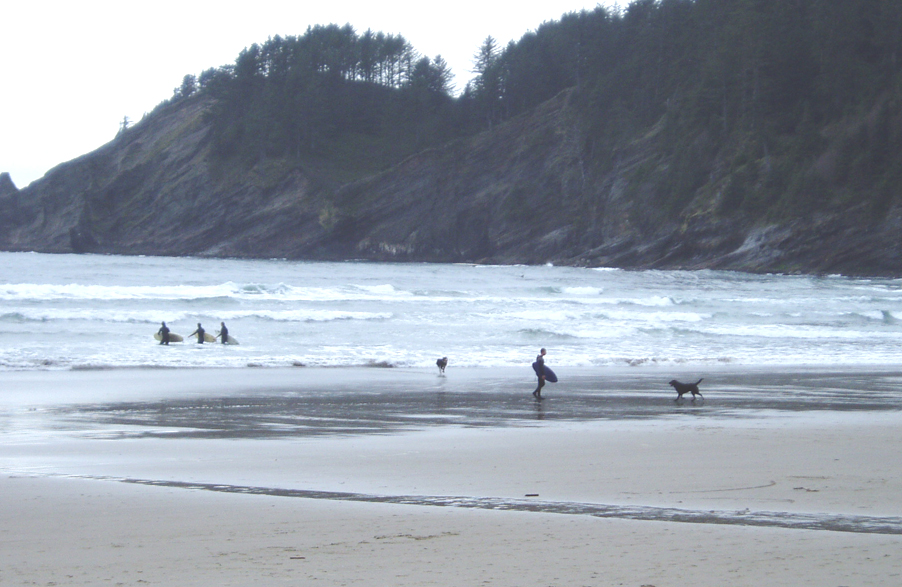
Beach goers and surfers at Short Sands

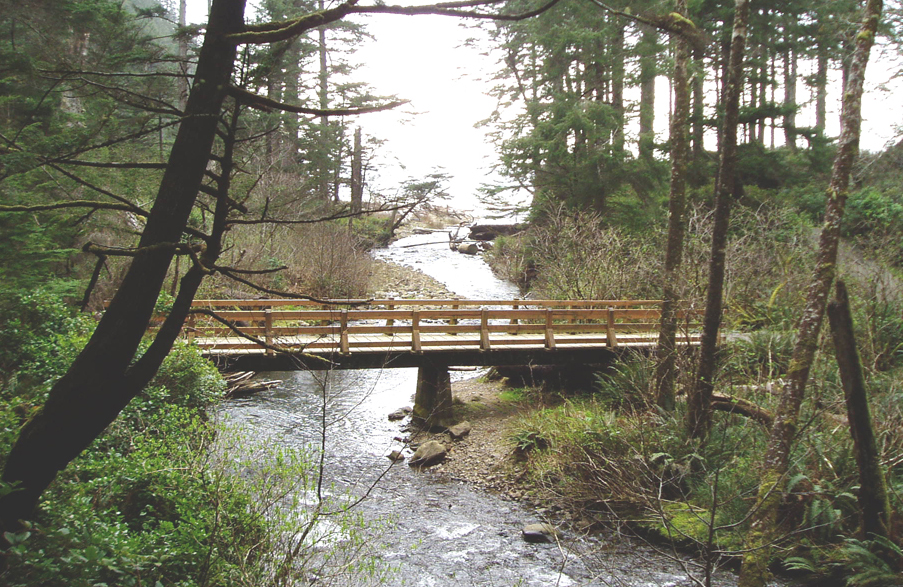
The footbridge over Short Sand Creek

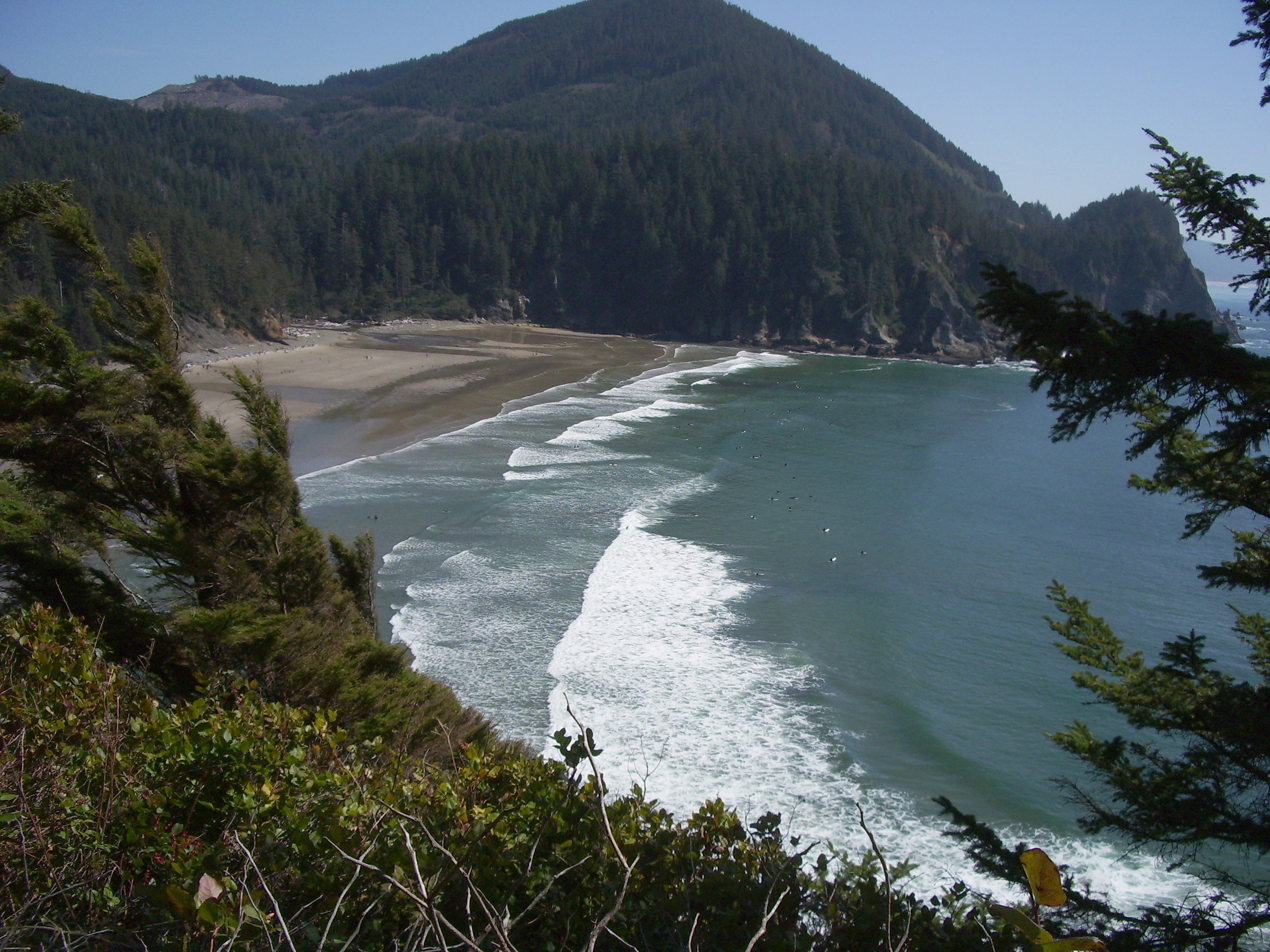
The sand beach at Oswald West State Park's Smuggler Cove; more than 50 surfers are visible (at full image resolution)

== See also ==
- List of Oregon state parks
