= San Juanillo =

The San Juanillo was the Manila galleon which wrecked on a beach at Baja California in late 1578 or early 1579, thus becoming the first shipwreck on the coast of the Californias.

== Voyage ==
In the thirteenth year of the Manila galleon voyages, Francisco de Sande appointed Juan de Ribera as captain of the San Juanillo. While no records exist, the usual course was north, then east across the Pacific until land was sighted, often at about 42 degrees north. The ship then turned south.

== Baja California ==
Likely, the voyage had been delayed by becalming, unfavorable winds and/or storms. Likely having lost many sailors and with the remaining men sick with scurvy, the ship lost control. It sailed into a beach and water filled its interior. Teredos chewed through the wax blocks. A couple of years later, a storm tore the wreck apart, spreading parts of the ship and its cargo up and down the beach for miles.

== Discovery and Archaeology ==
A group of American beachcombers found porcelains on a beach in Mexico. A 1997 exhibit at the Los Angeles County Museum of Art included some of the porcelain fragments. The associated publication, Chinese Ceramics in Colonial Mexico, led Saryl and Edward Von der Porten to believe that there must be an unknown Manila galleon wreck on the Baja California coast. Negotiations with the beachcombers and work with Instituto Nacional de Antropología e Historia led to nearly twenty expeditions and identification of the fate of the San Juanillo.
