= Netarts, Oregon =

Unincorporated community in the state of Oregon, United States

- Census-designated place (CDP)
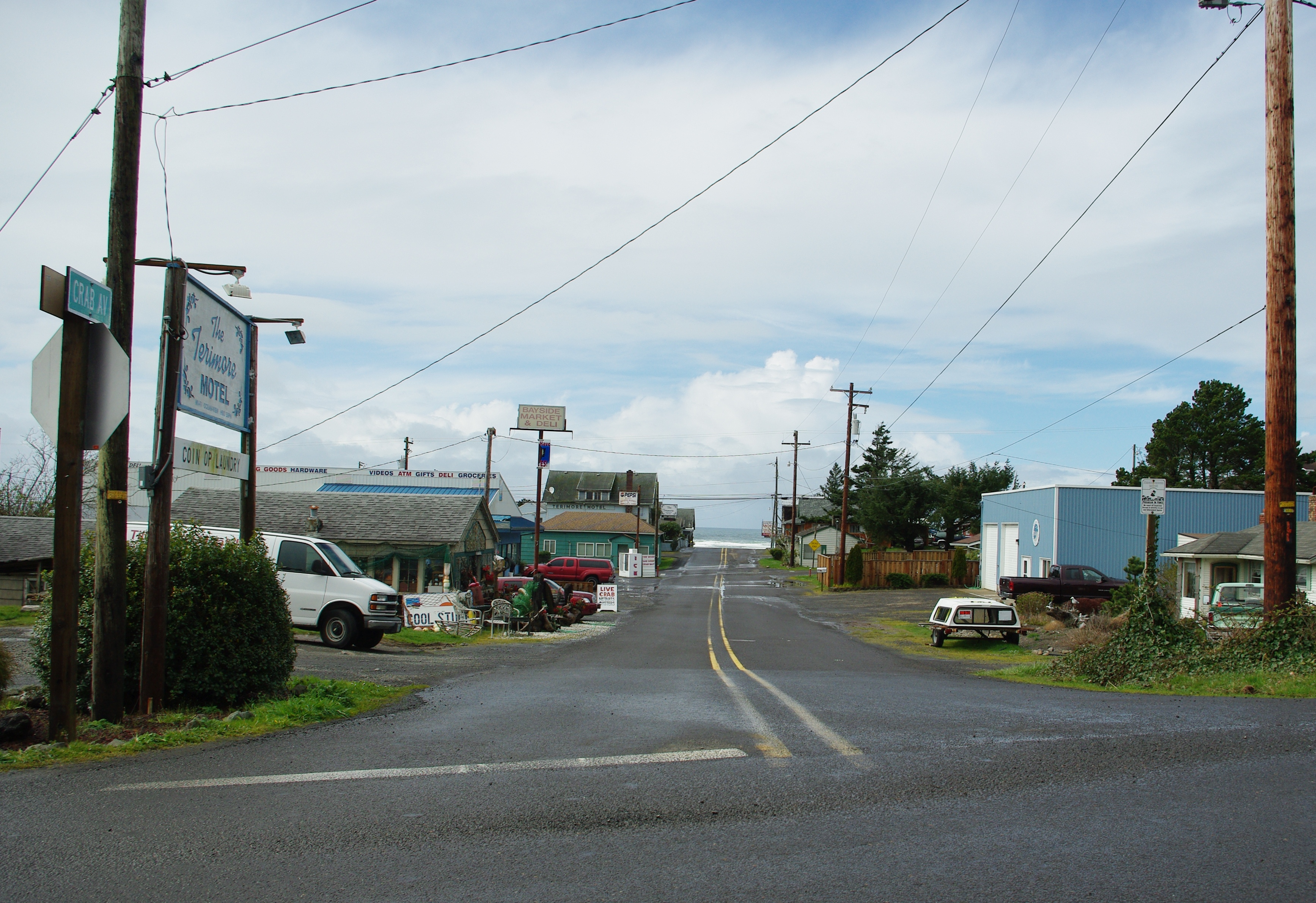
- Crab Avenue

- Location of Netarts, Oregon
- Coordinates: 45°26′08″N 123°56′04″W
- Country: United States
- State: Oregon
- County: Tillamook

Area
  - Total: 2.60 sq mi (6.73 km^{2})
  - Land: 2.60 sq mi (6.73 km^{2})
  - Water: 0 sq mi (0.00 km^{2})
- Elevation: 207 ft (63 m)

Population (2020)
  - Total: 894
  - Density: 344.1/sq mi (132.85/km^{2})
- Time zone: UTC-8 (Pacific (PST))
  - Summer (DST): UTC-7 (PDT)
- ZIP code: 97143
- Area code: 503
- FIPS code: 41-52050
- GNIS feature ID: 2408916

Netarts /ˈniːtɑːrts/ is an unincorporated community in Tillamook County, Oregon, United States; it is a census-designated place (CDP). As of the 2020 census, Netarts had a population of 894.

== Geography ==
According to the United States Census Bureau, the CDP has a total area of 2.6 square miles (6.7 km^{2}), all of it land.

== Demographics ==
Historical population
Census	Pop.	Note	%±
2020	894		—
U.S. Decennial Census

As of the census of 2000, there were 744 people, 379 households, and 206 families residing in the CDP. The population density was 283.6 inhabitants per square mile (109.5/km^{2}). There were 663 housing units at an average density of 252.7 per square mile (97.6/km^{2}). The racial makeup of the CDP was 95.16% White, 0.54% Native American, 0.54% Asian, 0.13% Pacific Islander, 1.48% from other races, and 2.15% from two or more races. Hispanic or Latino of any race were 3.23% of the population.

There were 379 households, out of which 14.2% had children under the age of 18 living with them, 45.6% were married couples living together, 5.8% had a female householder with no husband present, and 45.6% were non-families. 38.5% of all households were made up of individuals, and 13.7% had someone living alone who was 65 years of age or older. The average household size was 1.96 and the average family size was 2.54.

In the CDP, the population was spread out, with 15.1% under the age of 18, 4.3% from 18 to 24, 20.8% from 25 to 44, 34.0% from 45 to 64, and 25.8% who were 65 years of age or older. The median age was 51 years. For every 100 females, there were 94.8 males. For every 100 females age 18 and over, there were 92.1 males.

The median income for a household in the CDP was $31,204, and the median income for a family was $41,333. Males had a median income of $36,875 versus $28,650 for females. The per capita income for the CDP was $18,888. About 11.5% of families and 17.3% of the population were below the poverty line, including 53.9% of those under age 18 and 3.5% of those age 65 or over.

== Education ==
It is in the Tillamook School District 9.

The county is in the Tillamook Bay Community College district.

== See also ==
- Netarts Bay
