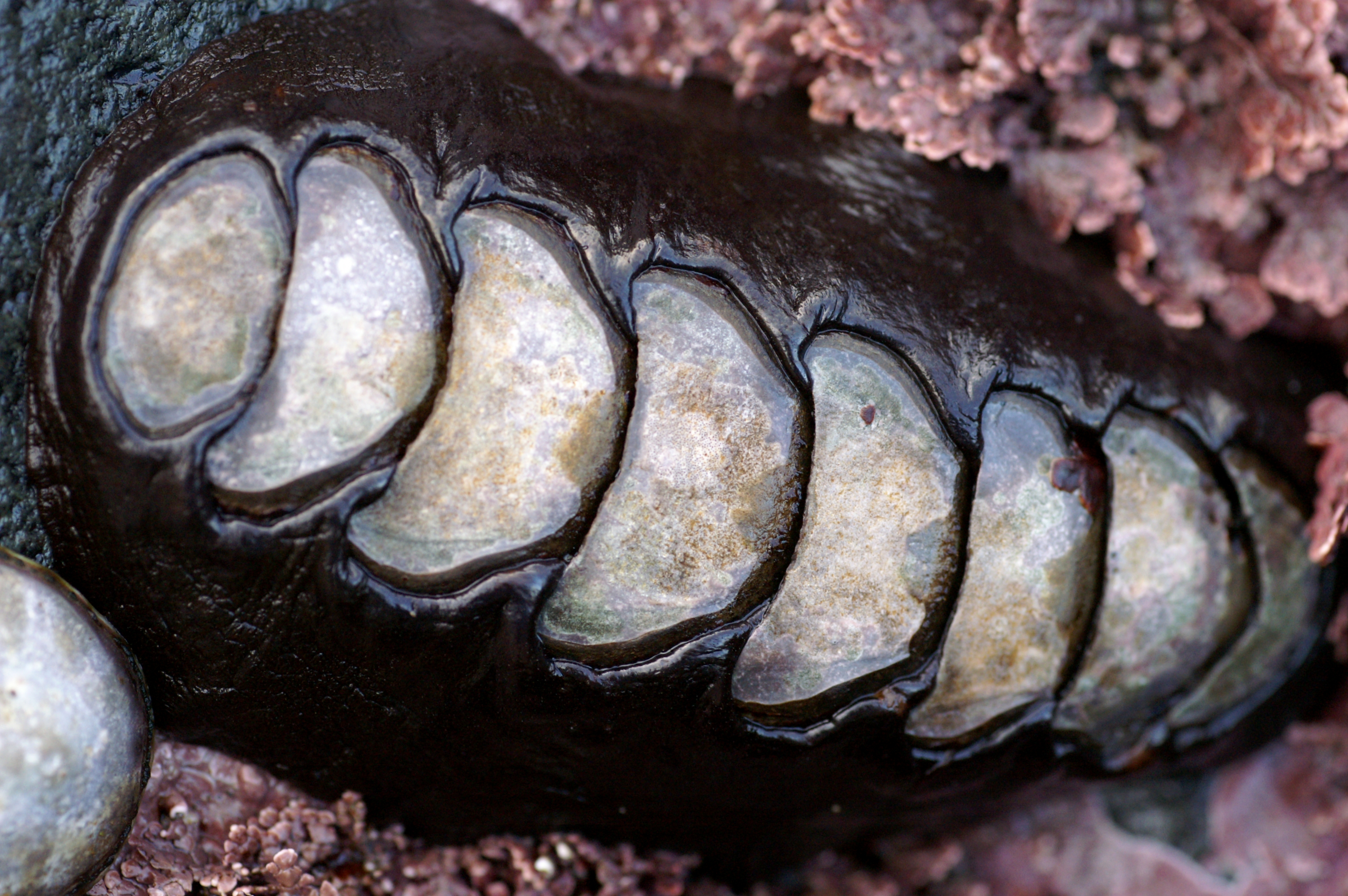

Conservation status
- Secure (NatureServe)

Scientific classification
- Kingdom: Animalia
- Phylum: Mollusca
- Class: Polyplacophora
- Order: Chitonida
- Family: Mopaliidae
- Genus: Katharina; Gray, 1847
- Species: K. tunicata

Binomial name
- Katharina tunicata (Wood, 1814)

Synonyms
- Chiton tunicatus Wood, 1814; Katharina douglasiae Gray, 1847

= Katharina tunicata =

Species of mollusc

Katharina tunicata , commonly known as the black Katy chiton, black leather chiton, black chiton, leather chiton, or Kasuqix in the indigenous Aleut language, is a species of chiton in the family Mopaliidae. It is the only species in the monotypic genus Katharina.

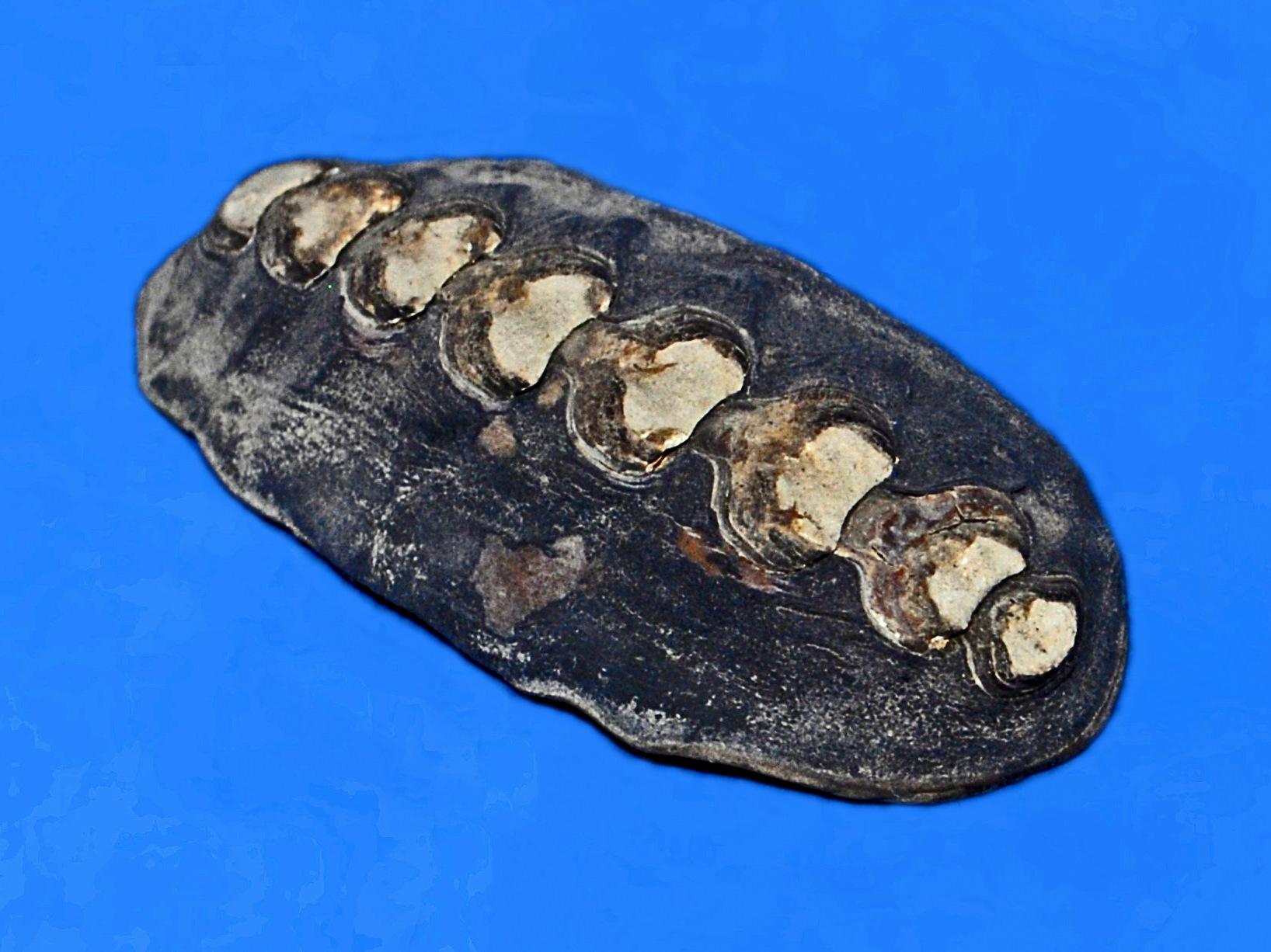
Dorsal view of Katharina tunicata. Museum specimen

== Description ==
Capable of growing up to 12 cm, the animal is generally described as being football-shaped with a black leathery girdle in which are embedded eight protective plates. The parts of the plates that are visible are sometimes (but not always) diamond-shaped in outline. The underside of the animal is dull orange or yellow.

== Anatomy ==
From the dorsal view, the mantle, girdle, and 8 valves are easily distinguishable. The girdle is covered with a chitinous cuticle. The ventral side shows the muscular foot surrounded by the gills on either side. This view also shows the mouth, anterior to the foot, and the anus, posterior to the foot encompassed by the mantle cavity and pallial fold which is then surrounded by the girdle. The gonopores are located at the posterior end just above the anus. The internal anatomy consists of a complete gut, a nervous system with two visceral nerve cords and two serving the foot, and a hemal system composed of the heart, vessels, and unlined sinuses that make the hemocoel.

== Feeding habits ==
Like other chitons, it is a slow moving grazer that consumes several species of brown and red algae including kelps, sea lettuce, and encrusting diatoms. They're also known to eat sponges, tiny barnacles, spirobid polychaetes, and bryozoans. Their predators include sea urchins, leather stars, black oystercatchers, glaucous-winged gulls, and humans.

== Reproduction ==
Black Katy chitons are primarily dioecious, diploid organisms. They reach sexual maturity at about 35mm in length. The decrease in temperature experienced around fall will trigger within a newly settled organism the growth of the gonads. Around springtime, the increase in temperatures will trigger the actual production of gametes. Males will first disperse their sperm into the tides which will then induce nearby females to launch their eggs forth to be fertilized. Settlement of the organism is influenced by the presence of coralline algae. Gametogenesis takes place for 5 months of the year, and most of these chitons will live through the reproduction cycle about 3 times.

Chitons undergo biochemical changes through the processes of sexual maturity and reproduction. Studies have been conducted, using K. tunicata, pertaining to the ratio of neutral and polar lipids found within the organism at different stages of its life.

== Distribution ==
Its distribution ranges from Kamchatka, Russia through the Aleutian Islands to southern California. However, modern, accurate surveys do not exist.

== Habitat ==
These chitons can be found in intertidal zones to 40m depths. Heavy waves on rocky shores are favorable. K. tunicata is unique compared to other chitons in that it tolerates direct sunlight.

These intertidal zones are susceptible to contamination from industrial activities, timber harvesting, mining, seafood processing, as well as coastal development. Over-visitation and over-harvesting are a common concern. Effects of climate change, present and future, are not fully understood but it will probably affect the diversity and structure of the intertidal communities K. tunicata reside in. This species is protected in the USA under the Coastal Zone Management Act.

== Relationships with Humans ==
Black katy chitons are nutritious, being sources of Vitamin A, riboflavin, and niacin. As a common and nutritious species on rocky shores across the northwestern Pacific Coast, they are an important food source for people. The Indigenous peoples of California cook this animal on coals or in an earth oven. In the Pacific Northwest, black chitons are cooked -- typically quickly boiled -- or eaten raw. The Makah have historically used raw black chiton as a relaxant. Chitons are involved in Haida creation stories, as responsible for creating women, as well as in a story about a cooking contest between the Kitkatla people and the Skidegate Inlet people, where chitons are described as extremely quick to cook.

Further northward, the chiton is still a common and important food source. The Sugpiaq people of the outer Kenai Peninsula, a large peninsula in South-Central Alaska, refer to the chiton in Sugt’stun as urriitaq, or bidarkis, coming from the Russian word for 'little kayak'. They have harvested them for at least 3,000 years. Starting in the 1990s, a decline in the bidarkis was noticed by scientists and elders. After thousands of years of harvest, and oral memory of Katy chiton harvest going back at least a century, a decline was alarming. Through social, historical, and biological research, it was eventually determined that the chiton decline was connected to numerous historical events, including factors leading back to the 1780s, with the arrival of Russian fur traders. With furring came a sedentization of Sugpiaq settlement patterns, as well as the extirpation of sea otter, a predator of the chiton, along the Alaskan coast, leading to a temporary rise in Katy chiton populations. Sea otters were protected in 1911, and returned to the Kenai Peninsula around the 1960s. Given that villages were now in one place, that freezers led to a large increase in how many chitons could be harvested, as well as the Exxon-Valdis spill motivating changes in harvesting, the reintroduction of the sea otter led to a synergistic decline, where all factors worked together to increase the decline of chitons, more than could be explained by just the reintroduction of sea otters alone.

Archaeologists such as Jon M. Erlandson, when discussing the early peopling of the Americas along the Pacific Coast, propose that early inhabitants followed a 'kelp highway' -- near-coastal routes that passed through kelp forests from Alaska to Baja California. Kelp forests provide navigable waters and a number of resources. As a common species along the entire range, the chiton would be a familiar food source to people travelling the 'kelp highway'.
