= Neahkahnie Beach, Oregon =

Unincorporated community in the state of Oregon, United States

- Unincorporated community & census-designated place
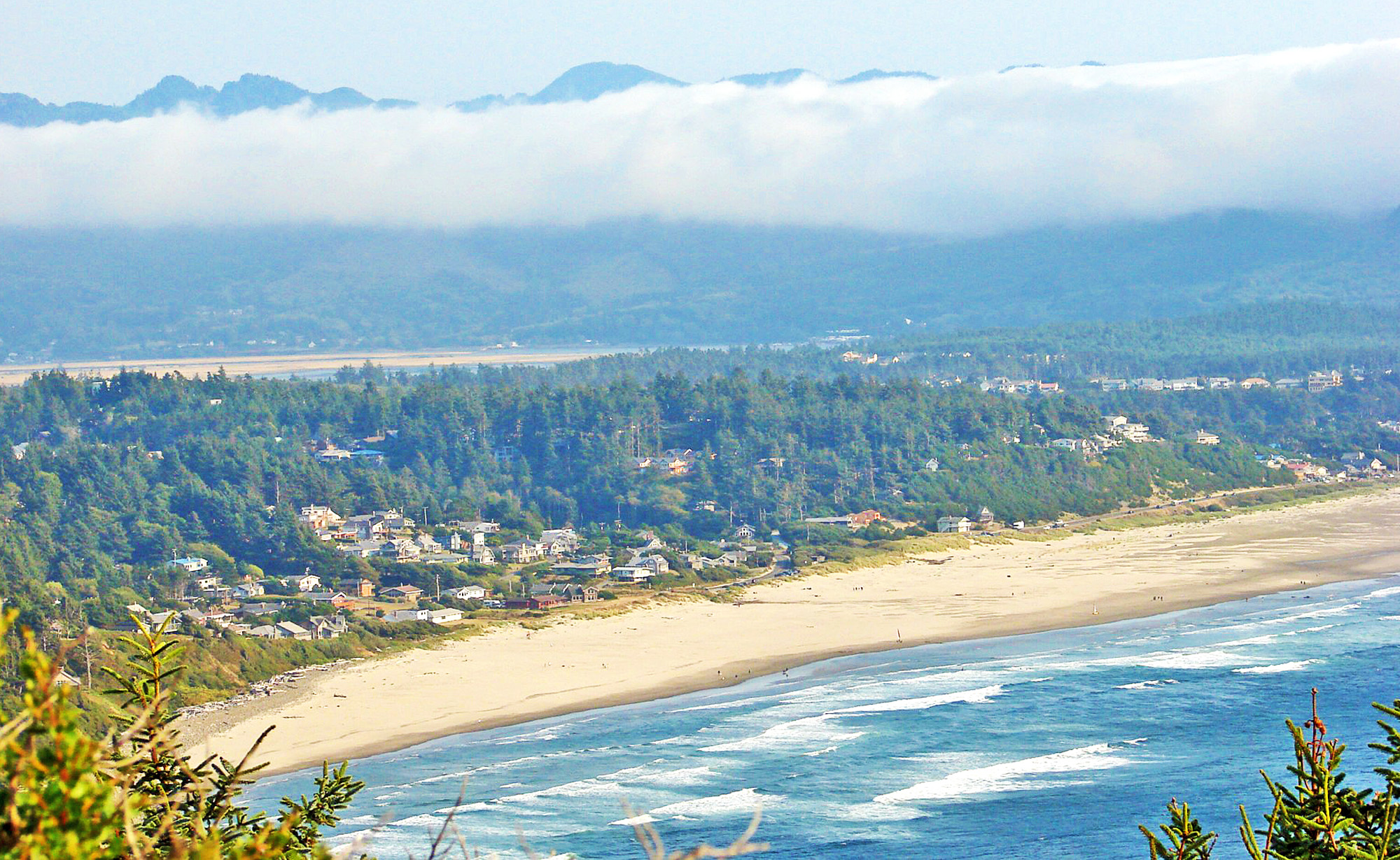
- View of Neahkanie Beach, Manzanita, and Nehalem Bay from Oswald West State Park

- Location within Oregon Location within the United States
- Coordinates: 45.729°N 123.941°W
- Country: United States
- State: Oregon
- County: Tillamook
- Elevation: 85 ft (26 m)
- Time zone: UTC-8 (Pacific (PST))
  - Summer (DST): UTC-7 (PDT)
- ZIP code: 97131
- Area codes: 503 and 971

Neahkahnie Beach (or Neahkahnie) is a census-designated place and unincorporated community in Tillamook County, Oregon, United States. It is located west of U.S. Route 101, comprising approximately 370 residences north of the city of Manzanita, at the foot of Neahkahnie Mountain. For statistical purposes, the United States Census Bureau has defined Neahkahnie as a census-designated place (CDP). The census definition of the area may not precisely correspond to local understanding of the area with the same name. According to the 2020 Census, the population was 197.

== Education ==
It is in the Neah-Kah-Nie School District 56. The district's comprehensive high school is Neah-Kah-Nie High School.

The county is in the Tillamook Bay Community College district.

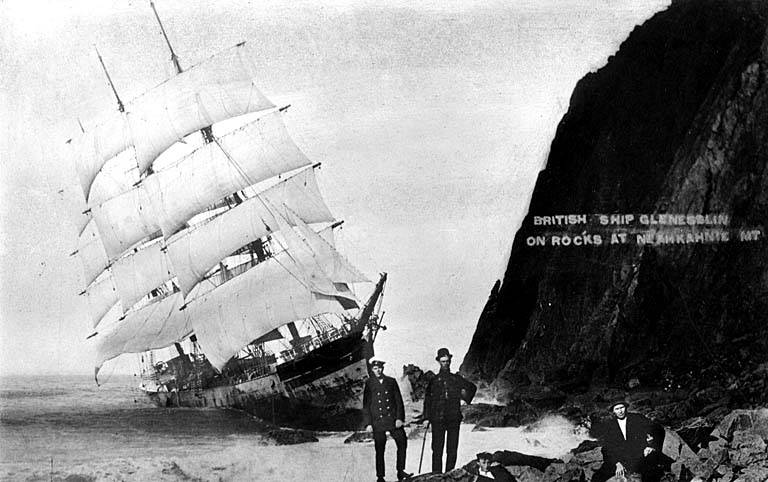
Wreck of the square rigger GLENESSLIN at Mt Neah-Kah-Nie, Oregon coast, 1913
