= Nehalem Bay State Park =

State park in Oregon, United States

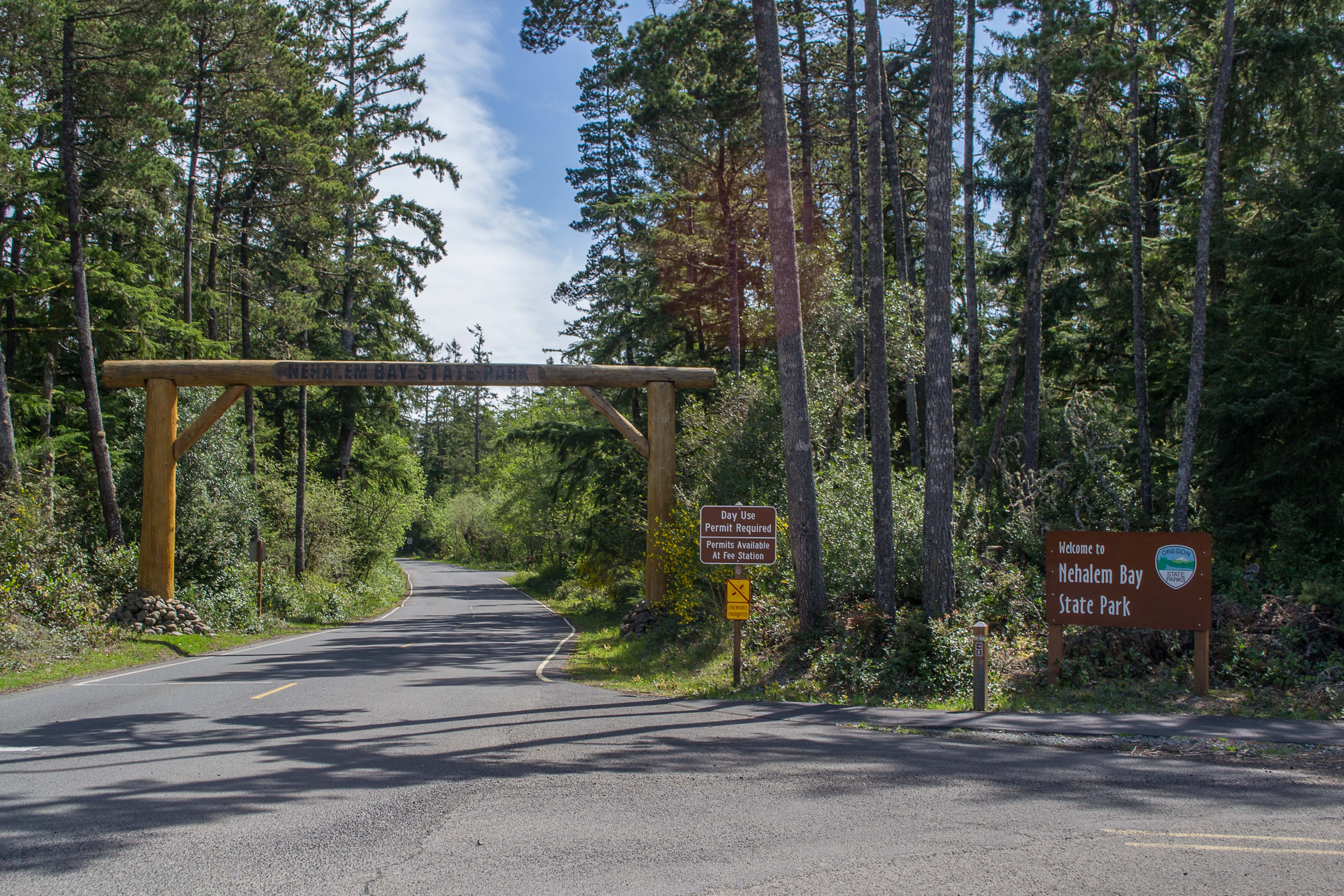

- Location within Oregon Location within the United States
- Type: Public, state
- Location: Tillamook, Oregon
- Nearest city: Manzanita
- Coordinates: 45°41′54″N 123°56′09″W
- Operator: Oregon Parks and Recreation Department

Nehalem Bay State Park is a state park in the United States located on the Oregon Coast, near the communities of Nehalem and Manzanita on the Nehalem Spit, a sand spit west of Nehalem Bay.

Tillamook County transferred the land to the State of Oregon for a park in the 1930s. During the 1940s and 1950s, workers planted European beach grass, shore pine, and Scotch broom to stabilize the dunes—a process that took an additional twenty years. The park opened in 1972.

This park has a day-use areas, and a campground for tents, recreational vehicles, horse riders, hikers and bicyclists.

Its wildlife includes a variety of birds, deer, elk, mountain lions, black bears and coyotes.

There is an air strip for small planes, the Nehalem Bay State Airport, and an amphitheater that has interpretative programs throughout the summer months.

Nehalem Beach is within the park.

== See also ==
- Nehalem Bank
- Cronin Point Site
