= Beeswax wreck =

17th Century shipwreck in Oregon, United States

Coordinates: 45.656°N 123.947°W

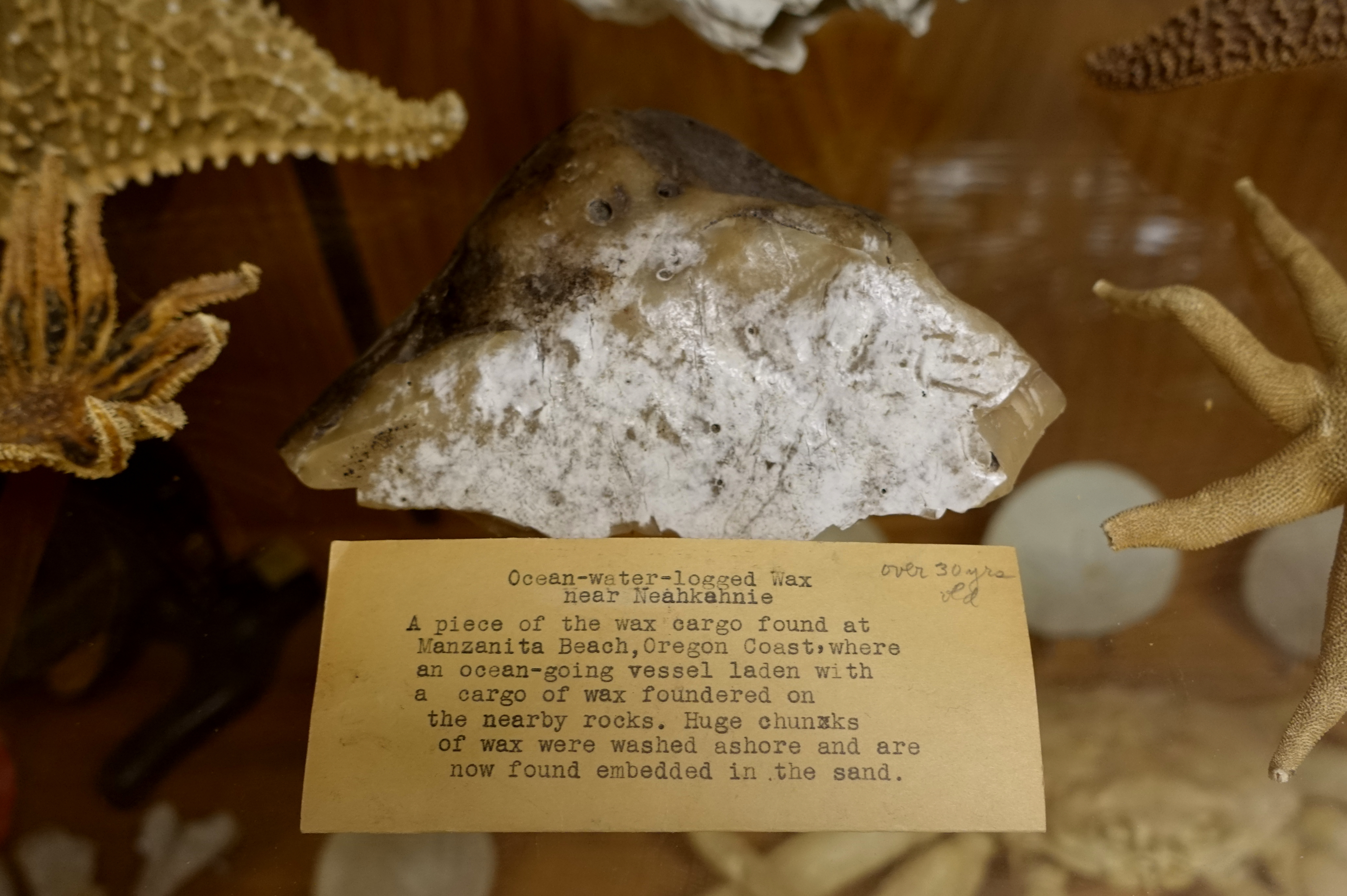
A piece of beeswax found on Manzanita beach.

The Beeswax Wreck is a shipwreck off the coast of the U.S. state of Oregon, discovered by Craig Andes near Cape Falcon in 2013 in Tillamook County. The ship, thought to be the Spanish Manila galleon Santo Cristo de Burgos that was wrecked in 1693, was carrying a large cargo of beeswax, lumps of which have been found scattered along Oregon's north coast for at least two centuries.

A fisherman based in Tillamook County, Craig Andes, told The Astorian he knew he had found something important when he found beams of dense wood inside caves just north of Manzanita in 2019.

Professionals were skeptical of what Andes thought he found. However, dating has led researchers and historians to believe that the pieces of wood are part of the Santo Cristo de Burgos shipwreck.

The ship, a Spanish galleon, left Manila in 1693, hauling porcelain, pottery and valuable wax that gave the ship its nickname – Beeswax.

== Early history ==
The earliest written reference to the wreck dates from 1813, when fur trader Alexander Henry, of Astoria, noted that the local Clatsop tribe had "great quantities of beeswax" to trade, which they told him had come from a shipwreck near Nehalem Bay. During the 1800s, residents of the Nehalem Valley traded their beeswax to places like Astoria, Portland, and even Honolulu. They also built furniture and souvenirs from the ship's teak timbers. Henry identified the ship in question as Spanish, but it is unknown how he arrived at this conclusion; he may have been shown some recognisably Spanish artifact from the wreckage, or he may have simply been making an assumption. He also reported that the crew of the ship had been "all murdered by the natives", a claim which corresponds with later reports based on information received from Native American informants.

Chunks of beeswax continued to be discovered along the shoreline throughout the 19th century, leading to much speculation about its origin. Towards the end of the century, it began to be doubted that such large quantities of wax, so widely dispersed, could originate from the wreckage of a single ship. In 1893, a sample of the wax was taken to be examined at the Columbian Exposition, where it was erroneously pronounced to be a naturally occurring petroleum wax. National interest in the phenomenon increased, and a geologist, J. S. Diller, was dispatched to the region by the United States Geological Survey. Diller found the substance to be beeswax, but this did not prevent several petroleum companies from making plans to drill for oil in the area.

== Modern studies ==
In addition to the beeswax, teak timbers and shards of Chinese porcelain have been found, further suggesting that the wreck is that of a Spanish Manila galleon, which would have made regular trips from Manila, Philippines, to Acapulco, Mexico, in the days of the Spanish Empire. Such ships were often constructed from teak, and would have been carrying luxury Chinese goods such as porcelain to trade – along with beeswax, which would have been needed in the Spanish colonies for making candles. The theory is strengthened by the fact that much of the beeswax is marked with Spanish shipping symbols, and the wings of bees native to the Philippines have been found trapped inside the wax. It is not known, however, why a Manila galleon would be sailing off the coast of Oregon, far north of the usual trade route; it is possible that it was disabled in a storm and drifted off course. Rodrigue Lévesque, compiler of the History of Micronesia, proposed that the galleon had lost its rudder, that an epidemic had left too few skilled navigators aboard, or that both occurred, allowing winds and currents to carry it north to Oregon.

By studying the designs on the porcelain shards, a team of researchers led by Scott Williams concluded in 2011 that the wreck must date from the late 17th century. According to the comprehensive records kept by the Spanish government of the time, only two Manila galleons went missing during that period – the Santo Christo de Burgos, in 1693, and the San Francisco Xavier, in 1705. The San Francisco Xavier was initially considered the more likely candidate, partly because it was thought that a tsunami which struck the Oregon coast in 1700 would have destroyed any evidence of an earlier shipwreck; however, after conducting further surveys, Williams' team now believes that the tsunami played a key role in dispersing the debris along the coastline, and that the wreck's true identity is therefore the Santo Christo de Burgos.

In July 2018 a special issue of the Oregon Historical Quarterly was devoted to the wreck. Titled "Oregon's Manila Galleon", the issue features articles describing the ongoing research as of 2018. According to the issue's articles the galleon was probably the Santo Cristo de Burgos, voyage of 1693. Oral histories of the Tillamook and Clatsop are described, as well as the archaeology efforts and results as of 2018. Additional articles provide information about the crew, passengers, and cargo that was aboard the Santo Cristo.

Though efforts have been made to locate the wreck for over a century, it was not until 2022 that the first remnants of the ship's structure were found, by local fisherman Craig Andes. These were removed and tested by state park officials and archeologists, and identified as likely belonging to the Santa Cristo de Burgos, lost in the winter of 1692. The location of the remains fit with previous account in the 19th century that said there was wreckage along the cliffs. This discovery allows marine archeologists to analyze the ship itself, and was described by Williams as an exciting leap. The timber's discoverer, Craig Andes, had previously identified other timbers in the sea caves in the spring of 2019 and in 2013. As of 2026 the main hull of the wreck has never been found.

== See also ==
- Cronin Point Site
- Augustus C. Kinney
- List of Oregon shipwrecks
- Chief Kilchis
