= Nehalem Bay =

- Location in Oregon
- Interactive map of Nehalem Bay
- Location: Northern Oregon, United States
- Coordinates: 45°41′30″N 123°55′25″W
- Type: Bay, Estuary
- Part of: Pacific Ocean
- Primary inflows: Nehalem River
- River sources: Nehalem River
- Primary outflows: Pacific Ocean
- Ocean/sea sources: Pacific Ocean
- Catchment area: 850 sq mi (2,200 km^{2})
- Basin countries: United States
- Salinity: Brackish (estuary)
- Surface elevation: 0 ft (0 m) (at sea level)
- Settlements: Nehalem

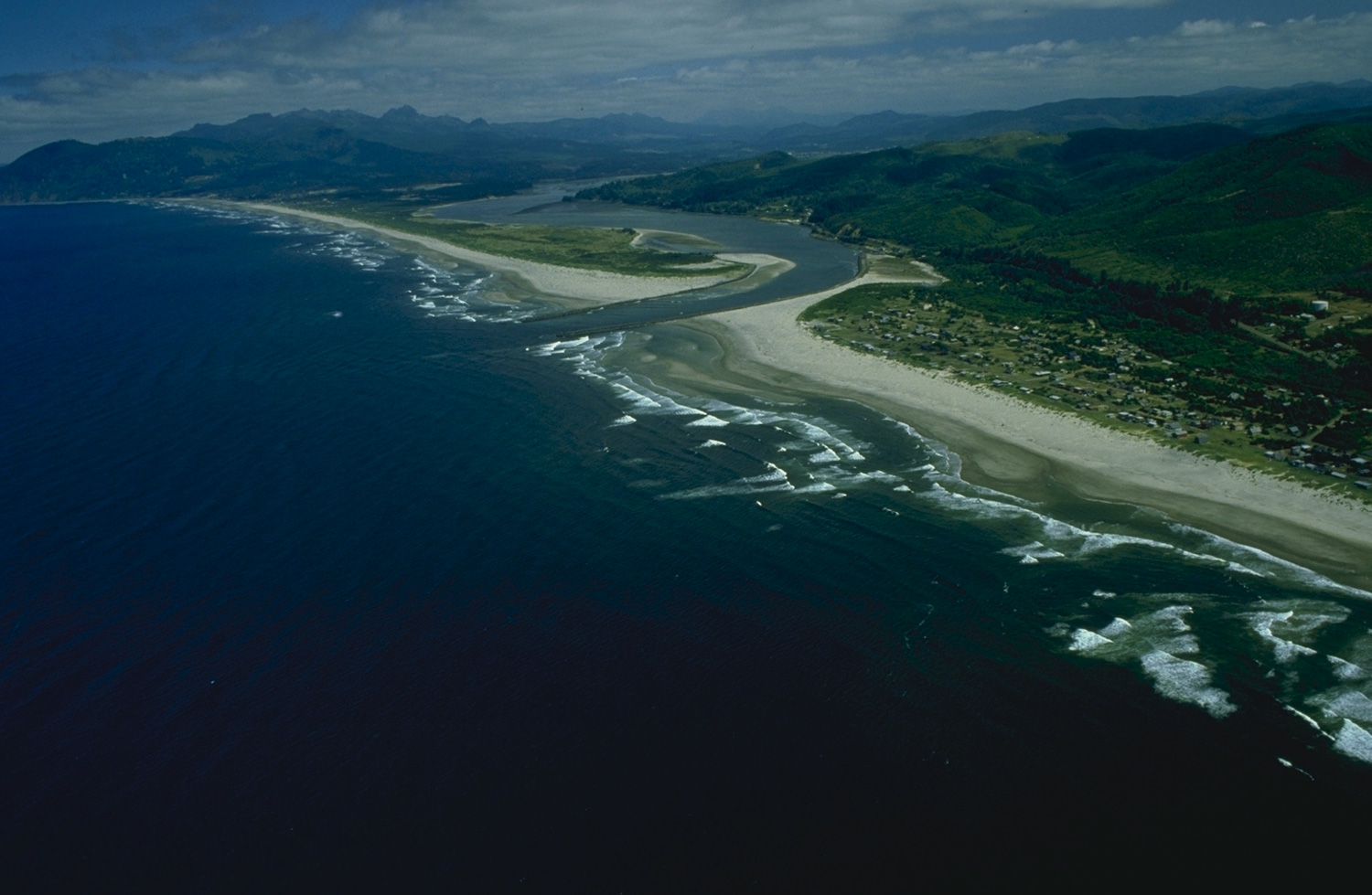
Nehalem Bay at the mouth of the Nehalem River on the Pacific Ocean

Nehalem Bay is a bay formed by the confluence of the Nehalem River with the Pacific Ocean in northern Oregon, United States. It is Oregon's fifth-largest estuary. The main tributary of Nehalem Bay is the Nehalem River. Nehalem Bay drains an area of more than 850 square miles.

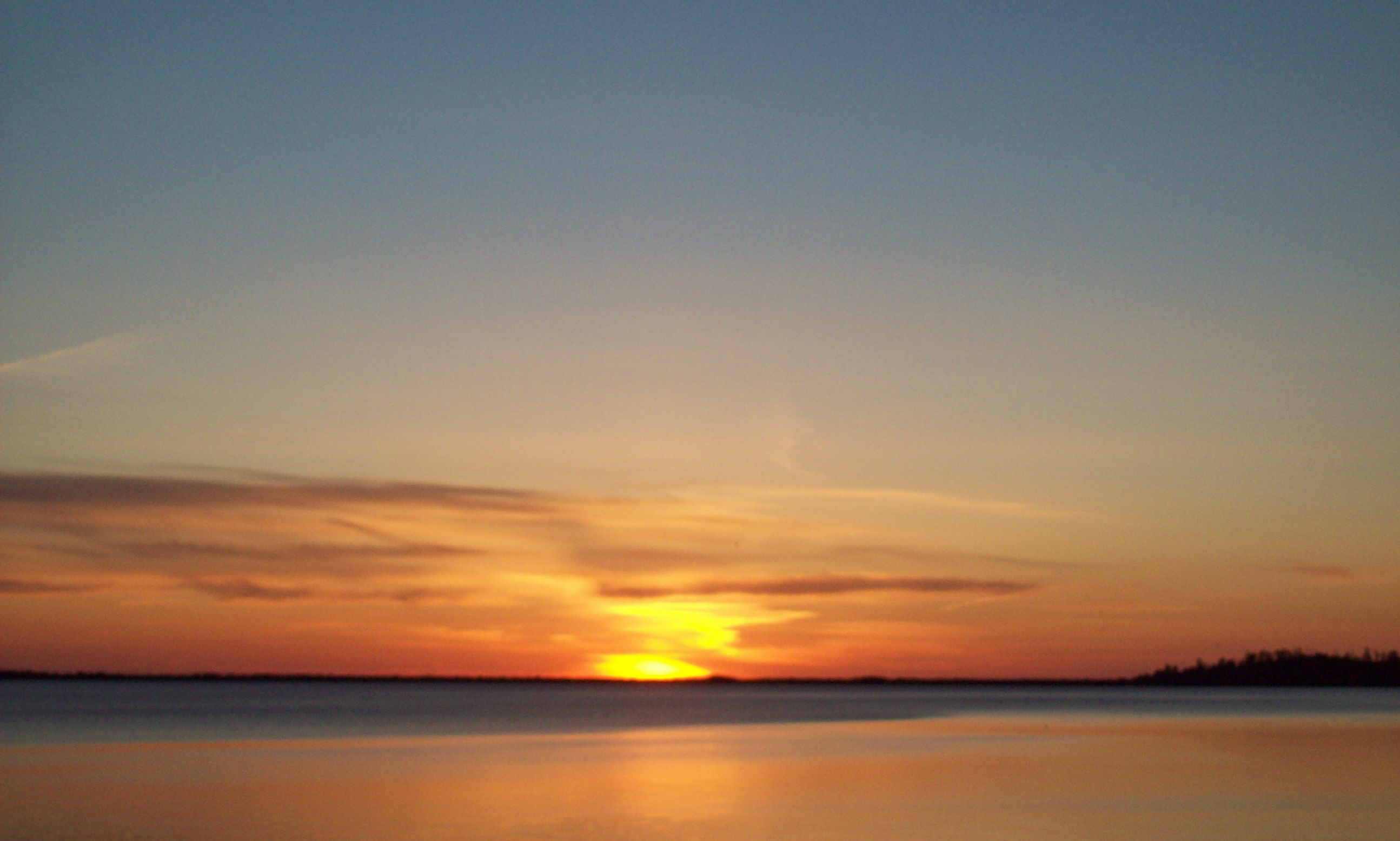
Sunset over the bay in February 2010

The city of Nehalem (pop. 271 in 2010) is situated on US Highway 101 north of Garibaldi and south of Cannon Beach.

West of the bay, Nehalem Bay State Park is located on the sandspit separating the bay from the ocean, where elk, coyotes, and several species of birds live. The park has a long beach, where centuries-old Spanish shipwrecks have been found. The park has campsites and yurts open year round.

Historians have argued whether British explorer Sir Francis Drake sought safe harbor for his ship, the Golden Hind (originally called "The Pelican"), in Nehalem Bay. According to Garry D. Gitzen, author of the 2011 book "Francis Drake In Nehalem Bay 1579, Setting the Historical Record Straight," Drake sailed "northward to the Pacific Northwest at 44° and then to 48° north latitude in the summer of 1579, until he entered into a fair and fit harbor for his five-week stay in Nehalem Bay to repair his leaking ship."

In 1693, a Spanish trading ship wrecked near Nehalem Bay in what is known as the Beeswax Wreck.
