= Manzanita, Oregon =

- City
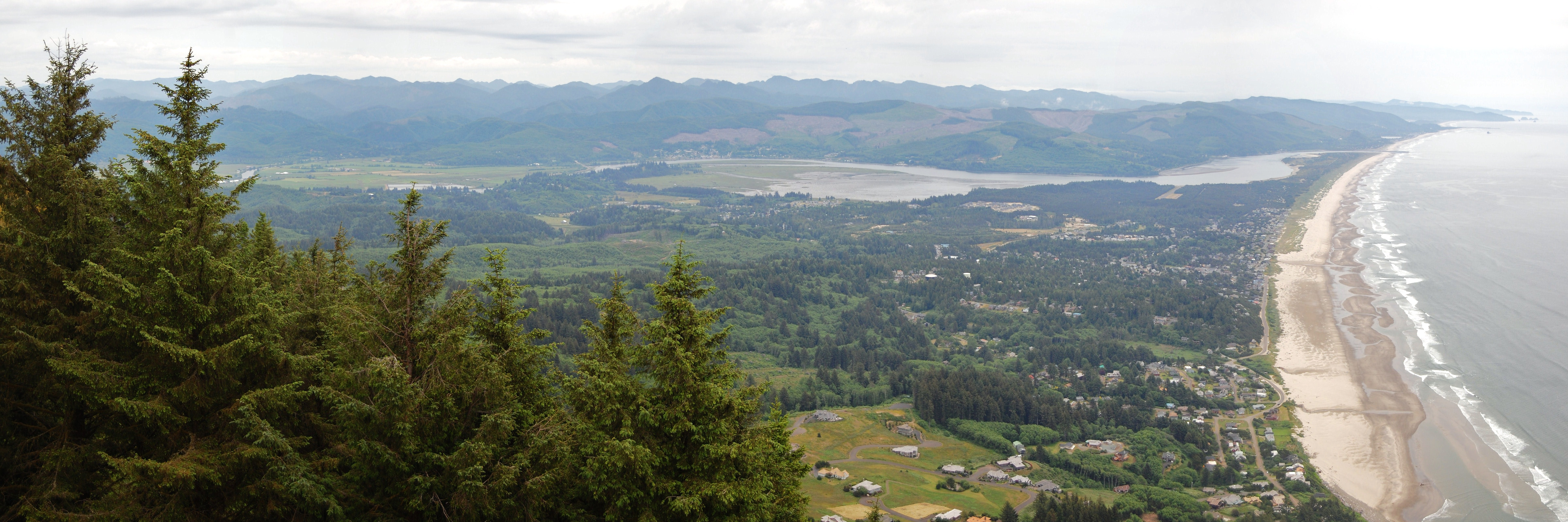
- View of Manzanita and Nehalem Bay from Neahkahnie Mountain

- Location in Oregon
- Coordinates: 45°43′00″N 123°56′06″W
- Country: United States
- State: Oregon
- County: Tillamook
- Incorporated: 1946

Government
  - Type: Tribal Council Government
  - Mayor: Kathryn Stock

Area
  - Total: 0.82 sq mi (2.13 km^{2})
  - Land: 0.82 sq mi (2.13 km^{2})
  - Water: 0 sq mi (0.00 km^{2})
- Elevation: 39 ft (12 m)

Population (2020)
  - Total: 603
  - Density: 734.2/sq mi (283.48/km^{2})
- Time zone: UTC−8 (Pacific)
  - Summer (DST): UTC−7 (Pacific)
- ZIP Code: 97130
- Area code: 503
- FIPS code: 41-45700
- GNIS feature ID: 2411027
- Website: www.ci.manzanita.or.us

Manzanita /ˌmænzəˈniːtə/ is a coastal city in Tillamook County, Oregon, United States. It is located on U.S. Route 101 about 25 miles (40 km) equidistant from Seaside to the north and Tillamook to the south. The population was 603 at the 2020 census.

== History ==
The indigenous Tillamook people lived along the Oregon coast, including the Manzanita area (tidewaters of the Nehalem Bay), for about 12,000 years. They suffered from smallpox and other illnesses brought by white settlers, and the few remaining Tillamook people were relocated to the Siletz and Grand Ronde reservations in the 1850s.

At least two of Oregon's historical shipwrecks occurred off the Manzanita coast: the Glenesslin in 1913, and the Santo Cristo de Burgos (disappeared 1693) which has generated rumors of treasure buried on Neahkahnie Mountain.

Manzanita was platted as a beach resort in 1912. Manzanita post office was established in 1914 and named for the manzanita (Arctostaphylos sp.) plants that grow in the area. Manzanita means 'little apple' in Spanish.

=== Tornado ===
On the morning of October 14, 2016, an EF2 tornado, which had begun as a waterspout, hit Manzanita. Many buildings in the town were damaged, but no injuries were reported. The mayor of Manzanita declared a state of emergency in response.

== Geography ==
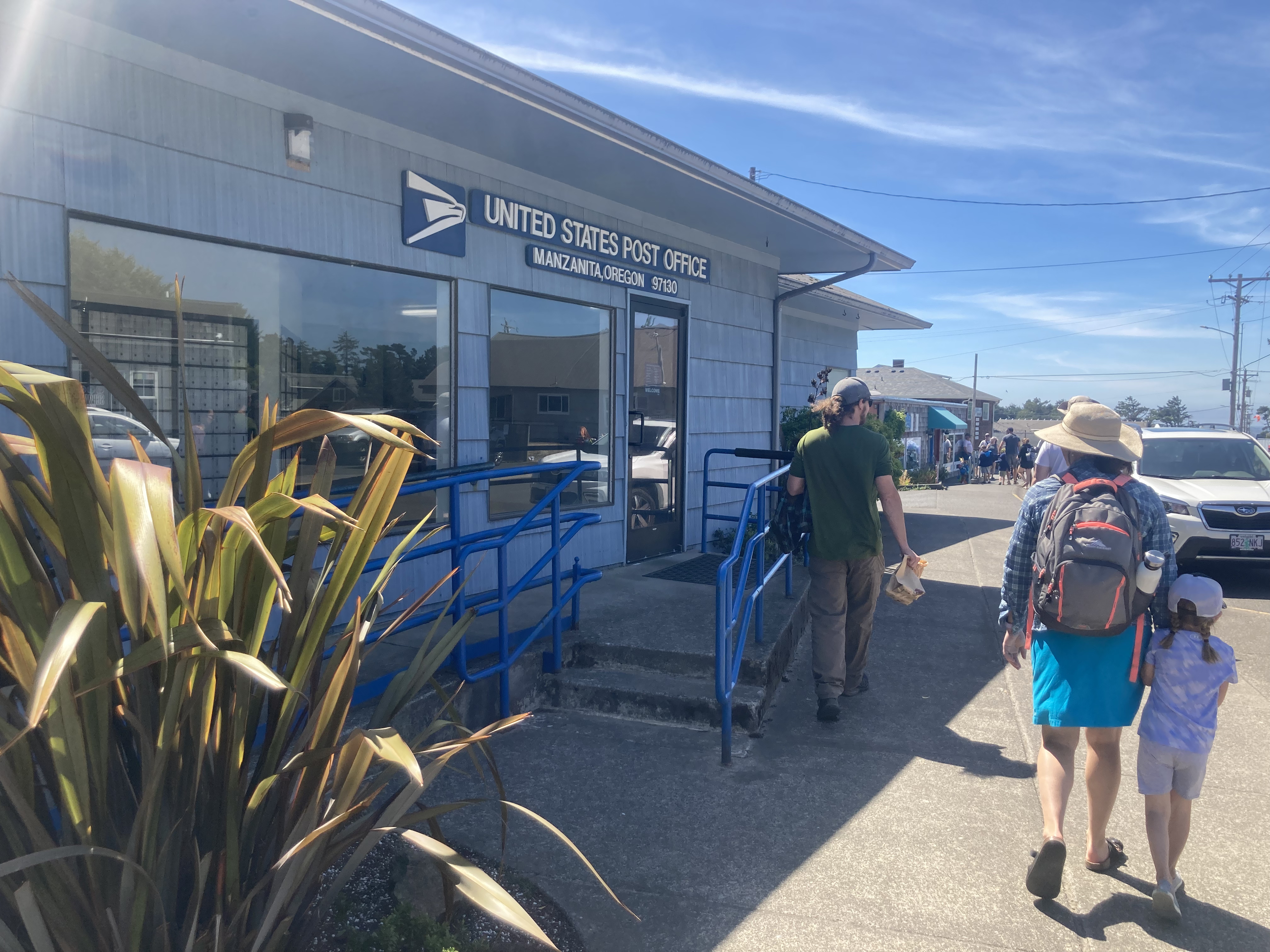
Tourists walk past the US Post Office

According to the United States Census Bureau, the city has a total area of 0.82 square miles (2.12 km^{2}), all of it land.

== Demographics ==
Historical population
Census	Pop.	Note	%±
1950	339		—
1960	363		7.1%
1970	365		0.6%
1980	443		21.4%
1990	513		15.8%
2000	564		9.9%
2010	598		6.0%
2020	603		0.8%
U.S. Decennial Census

=== 2020 census ===
As of the 2020 census, Manzanita had a population of 603. The median age was 65.8 years; 5.6% of residents were under the age of 18 and 52.1% were 65 years of age or older.

For every 100 females there were 89.6 males, and for every 100 females age 18 and over there were 85.3 males age 18 and over.

One hundred percent of residents lived in urban areas, while 0% lived in rural areas.

There were 354 households in Manzanita, of which 9.9% had children under the age of 18 living in them. Of all households, 43.8% were married-couple households, 18.9% were households with a male householder and no spouse or partner present, and 33.3% were households with a female householder and no spouse or partner present. About 43.5% of all households were made up of individuals and 24.8% had someone living alone who was 65 years of age or older.

There were 1,340 housing units, of which 73.6% were vacant. Among occupied housing units, 76.3% were owner-occupied and 23.7% were renter-occupied. The homeowner vacancy rate was 4.5% and the rental vacancy rate was 48.5%.

Racial composition as of the 2020 census
Race	Number	Percent
White	550	91.2%
Black or African American	5	0.8%
American Indian and Alaska Native	4	0.7%
Asian	17	2.8%
Native Hawaiian and Other Pacific Islander	1	0.2%
Some other race	10	1.7%
Two or more races	16	2.7%
Hispanic or Latino (of any race)	11	1.8%

=== 2010 census ===
As of the census of 2010, there were 598 people, 315 households, and 176 families living in the city. The population density was 729.3 inhabitants per square mile (281.6/km^{2}). There were 1,285 housing units at an average density of 1,567.1 per square mile (605.1/km^{2}). The racial makeup of the city was 91.6% White, 1.2% African American, 0.2% Native American, 1.8% Asian, 1.2% from other races, and 4.0% from two or more races. Hispanic or Latino of any race was 6.2% of the population.

There were 315 households, of which 10.8% had children under the age of 18 living with them, 50.8% were married couples living together, 3.5% had a female householder with no husband present, 1.6% had a male householder with no wife present, and 44.1% were non-families. 37.5% of all households were made up of individuals, and 17.7% had someone living alone who was 65 years of age or older. The average household size was 1.89 and the average family size was 2.40.

The median age in the city was 59.9 years. 10% of residents were under the age of 18; 2.2% were between the ages of 18 and 24; 14.4% were from 25 to 44; 36.5% were from 45 to 64; and 37% were 65 years of age or older. The gender makeup of the city was 48.2% male and 51.8% female.

=== 2000 census ===
As of the census of 2000, there were 564 people, 307 households, and 177 families living in the city. The population density was 759.1 inhabitants per square mile (293.1/km^{2}). There were 1,078 housing units at an average density of 1,450.9 per square mile (560.2/km^{2}). The racial makeup of the city was 96.45% White, 0.53% Native American, 0.89% from other races, and 2.13% from two or more races. Hispanic or Latino of any race were 1.60% of the population.

There were 307 households, out of which 9.4% had children under the age of 18 living with them, 51.1% were married couples living together, 4.6% had a female householder with no husband present, and 42.3% were non-families. 38.8% of all households were made up of individuals, and 18.6% had someone living alone who was 65 years of age or older. The average household size was 1.84 and the average family size was 2.33.

In the city, the population was spread out, with 10.8% under the age of 18, 4.3% from 18 to 24, 14.4% from 25 to 44, 36.0% from 45 to 64, and 34.6% who were 65 years of age or older. The median age was 57 years. For every 100 females, there were 84.9 males. For every 100 females age 18 and over, there were 83.6 males.

The median income for a household in the city was $38,750, and the median income for a family was $43,958. Males had a median income of $30,000 versus $25,833 for females. The per capita income for the city was $26,428. About 4.9% of families and 7.2% of the population were below the poverty line, including 22.4% of those under age 18 and 4.7% of those age 65 or over.

== Recreation ==
North County Recreation District organizes the annual "Manzanita Beach Walk & Run". Since 1990 the event, which is used as a fundraiser for the local fitness center located in Nehalem, has been run on the beach at the foot of Neahkahnie Mountain.

== Education ==
It is in the Neah-Kah-Nie School District 56. Manzanita students attend Nehalem Elementary School. The district has one middle school, Neah-Kah-Nie Middle School. The district's comprehensive high school is Neah-Kah-Nie High School. Nearby private schools include the Fire Mountain School, a K-5 outdoor education school.

The county is in the Tillamook Bay Community College district.

== Points of interest ==
- Nehalem Bay State Park

== Transportation ==
- Nehalem Bay State Airport
- Tillamook County Transportation District

== Notable people ==
- Dennis Awtrey, retired National Basketball Association player
