= Nestucca Bay National Wildlife Refuge =

Wildlife refuge in Oregon, United States

- IUCN category IV (habitat/species management area)
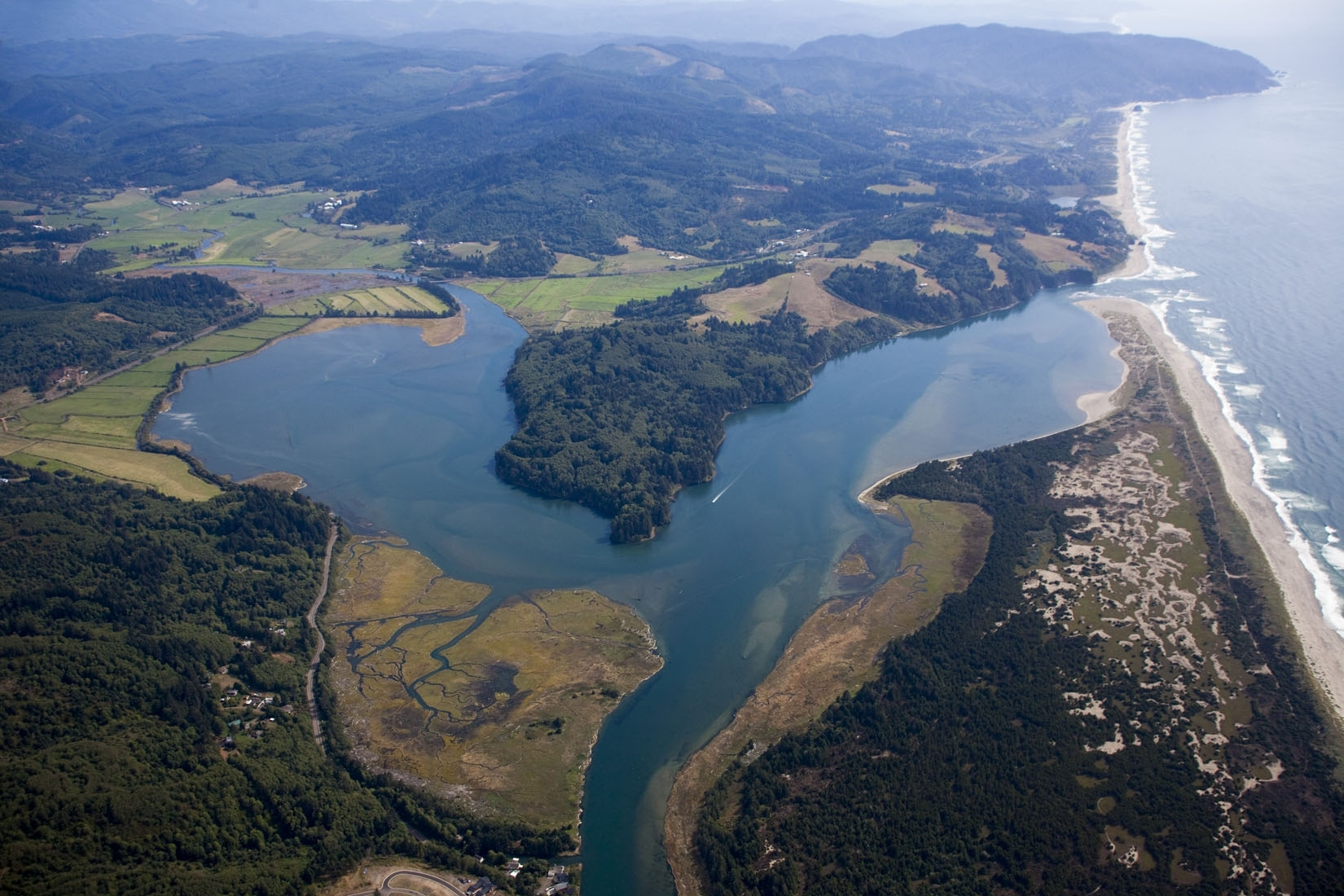
- Aerial view of the refuge

- Location within Oregon
- Location: Tillamook County, Oregon
- Nearest city: Tillamook
- Coordinates: 45°10′21″N 123°56′49″W
- Area: 888 acres (359 ha)
- Governing body: U.S. Fish and Wildlife Service
- Website: Nestucca Bay NWR

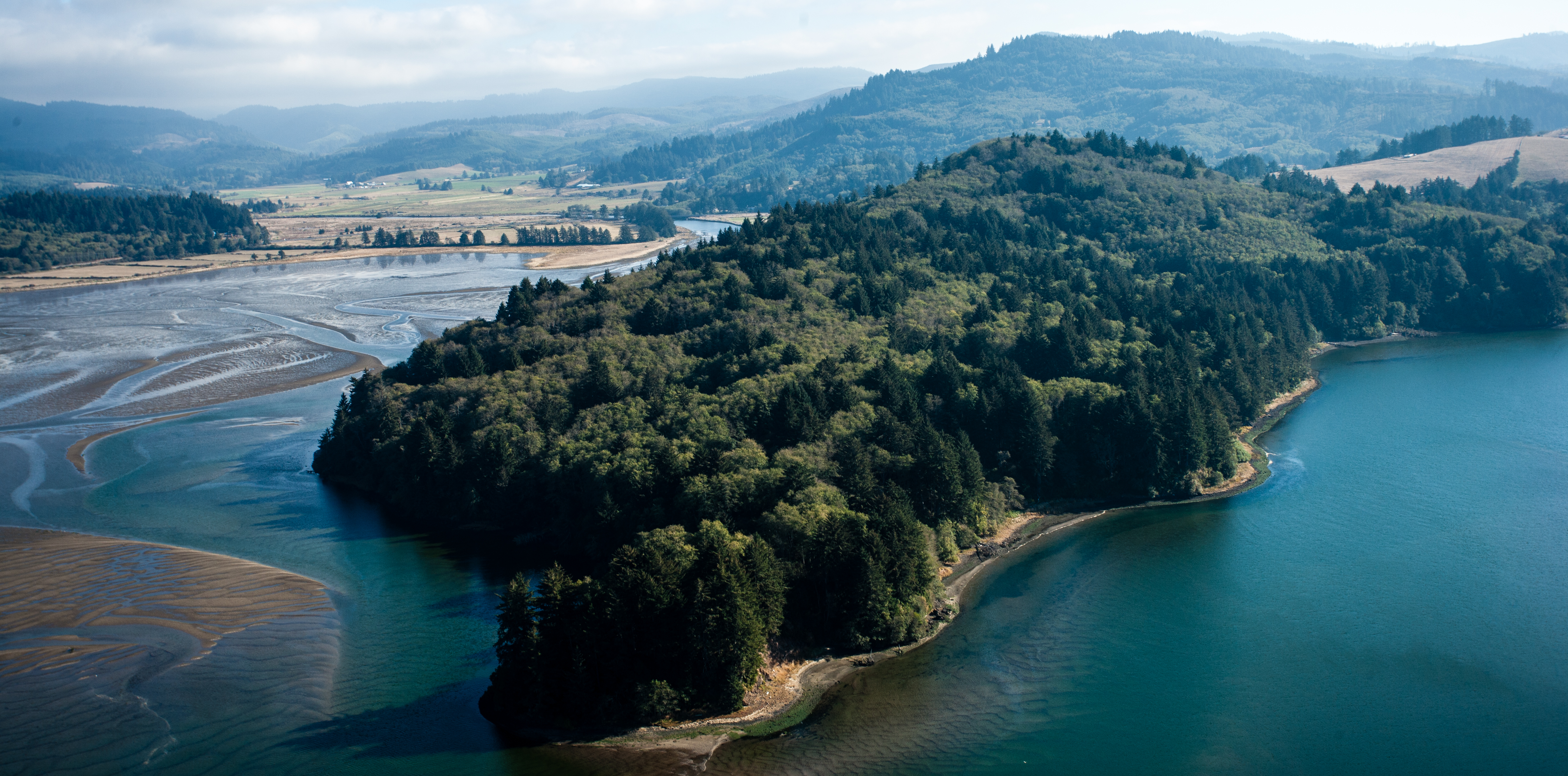
Cannery Hill headland on Nestucca Bay, added to NWR in 2013.

Nestucca Bay National Wildlife Refuge is a U.S. National Wildlife Refuge on Oregon's coast. It lies in southern Tillamook County, on the state's northern coast. It is one of six National Wildlife Refuges comprising the Oregon Coast National Wildlife Refuge Complex and supports one tenth of the world's dusky Canada goose population. The refuge contains at least seven types of habitat, including tidal marsh, tidal mudflats, grassland, woodland, pasture, forested lagg—a transition between raised peat bog and mineral soil—and freshwater bogs, including the southernmost coastal Sphagnum bog habitat on the Pacific Coast.

The Sphagnum bog provides habitat for many interesting and unusual species, such as the insect-eating sundew plant and the bog cranberry. Scientists have discovered many layers of sand and peat under Neskowin Marsh indicating a long history of tsunami activity which carries sand from the coastal sand dunes. These might be the best record of tsunami activity within the Cascadia subduction zone.

Chinook and coho salmon, coastal cutthroat trout and steelhead are all native to the Nestucca Bay and River system. November through April, the refuge's short grass pastures provide winter habitats for the previously mentioned dusky Canada goose and the Aleutian cackling goose. Notable winged residents include a variety of migrating shorebirds, peregrine falcons and bald eagles.

The refuge was established in 1991, and is on Nestucca Bay at the confluence of the Nestucca and Little Nestucca rivers, ranging 3 to 5 miles (5 to 8 km) south of Pacific City. Across the bay to the west is Nestucca Spit and Robert W. Straub state parks.

The refuge is closed to all public use, except during two special events: one in February and one in October. A viewing area is planned for construction, probably in 2008.

In 2010, Oregon writer Matt Love published a book about his experience serving as caretaker of the site for nine years during the restoration of the preserve from a one-time dairy farm back to its natural state. "Gimme Refuge: The Education of a Caretaker" Nestucca Spit Press. ISBN 9780974436449

== See also ==
- List of National Wildlife Refuges
