= Siletz =

Total population
- Fewer than 5,300 (2018)

Regions with significant populations
- United States (Oregon)

Languages
- English, formerly Dee Ni and Tillamook

Related ethnic groups
- Tolowa and Coast Salish peoples

The Siletz (pronounced sih-lets) were the southernmost of several divisions of the Tillamook people speaking a distinct dialect; the other dialect-divisions were: Salmon River on the Salmon River, Nestucca on Little Nestucca River, Nestucca River and Nestucca Bay, Tillamook Bay on the Tillamook Bay and the mouths of the Kilchis, Wilson, Trask and Tillamook rivers, and Nehalem on Nehalem River. The name "Siletz" comes from the name of the Siletz River on which they live. The origin of the name is unknown (perhaps Oregon Athabaskan? variants: Salǽˑtʃʼɪtʃʽ, Sai-lĕtc-́ĭc qûn-nĕ, and Sii-lee-ch'ish)

Their eastern neighbors the Central Kalapuya tribes called them Tsä Shnádsh amím.

In Chasta Costa and Euchre Creek-Tututni and Chetco-Tolowa they were known as Shii-lee-ch'ish, the Naltunne-Tututni name was Sai-lĕtc-́ĭc me-́t̟ûn-nĕ (all with reference to the Siletz River) and the Upper Coquille-Tututni name ʃɪllǽˑttʃʼɪʃmæ̽-dɜnhæ or Sii-lee-ch'ish- dv-ne ("Siletz River People").

Today they are a constituent band of the Confederated Tribes of Siletz Indians, and the group from which the confederation received its name. In 1856 following the Rogue River Wars in southern Oregon, people from among more than 27 Native Tribes and Bands, speaking 10 distinct languages: Alsea/Yaquina, chinuk wawa (also known as Chinook Jargon), Coos, Kalapuya, Molala, Shasta, Siuslaw/Lower Umpqua, Takelma, Tillamook, and a broad group of Athapascans speaking groups of SW Oregon, including Upper Umpqua, Coquille, Tututni, Chetco, Tolowa, Galice and Applegate River peoples who by treaty agreements and force were removed by the United States to the Coast Indian Reservation, later known as the Siletz Reservation.

Over generations the Siletz people have faced brutal federal policies which resulted their 1.1 million acre reservation being illegally taken from them. Congress passed the Western Oregon Termination Act, ending the government to government relationship with the Siletz Tribes. The Confederated Tribes of Siletz Indians was successful in lobbying Congress to repeal the Termination Act as applied to the Siletz and again was federally recognized as of November 18, 1977. Today their members are enrolled in the federally recognized tribe of the Confederated Tribes of Siletz Indians.

The only native language still spoken on the reservation is Siletz Dee-ni, which is a combination of all Athbaskan dialectic variant vocabularies spoken by several of the original reservation tribes. In cooperation with the National Geographic Society and the Living Tongues Institute for Endangered Languages, the tribe produced a "talking dictionary" of Siletz Dee-ni in 2007 to aid in preservation and teaching.

== History ==
Traditionally, the Siletz were believed to be a Coast Salishan-speaking group; they inhabited an area along the central coast of Oregon near the Siletz River until the middle of the 19th century. The tribe was considered the southernmost group of the larger Coast Salish culture, which was centered near the Strait of Georgia and Puget Sound in what are now British Columbia, Canada, and Washington, United States.

The Siletz were closely related in language and culture to the Tillamook tribe to their north along the Oregon Coast. During or after the Rogue River Wars of 1855–1856, which extended to areas of northern California, members of the tribe were moved by the United States government to the Coast Indian Reservation, later called the Siletz Reservation.

The Tillamook and peoples of more than 20 other small tribes, including the Tolowa people of northern California, were also removed to the reservation. It is located along the Siletz River in the Central Oregon Coast Range, 15 miles northeast of Newport, which is on the coast in Lincoln County.

== Language ==
The Siletz are believed to have spoken the "Siletz dialect" or "Southern Tillamook" of the Tillamook (Hutyéyu) language, which was part of the Coast Salish languages. Tillamook was declared extinct when its last native speaker died in 1970.

What is now known as the Siletz Dee-ni language was restricted historically to speakers in "a small area on the central Oregon coast." Linguists have concluded that Siletz is not related to Tillamook at all, but is a form of Tolowa, an Athabaskan language rather than a Salishan language. The Tolowa people were one of the 20 Native American groups whose descendants comprise the Confederated Tribes of Siletz.

In the 21st century, Siletz Dee-ni was the only native language still spoken on the reservation. Realizing that their language was endangered, the Consolidated Siletz tribe have taken actions to preserve and teach it. Also called Tolowa Dee-ni, the language has been studied by several groups. Members of the tribe have worked with a variety of linguists to document the language. Their work is "a comprehensive attempt to include the similarities and the differences of the known dialects of the Southwest Oregon / Northwestern California Athabaskan Language."

The Siletz have taken part in an international effort by the National Geographic Society, the Living Tongues Institute for Endangered Languages, and linguists such as K. David Harrison of Swarthmore College to save languages that are threatened with extinction. Alfred "Bud" Lane, among the last fluent native speakers of Siletz on the reservation, has recorded 14,000 words of the Siletz Dee-ni language. Lane and other Siletz had decided they wanted to work to preserve and revive the language.

Lane's work was used to help produce a Siletz talking dictionary, one of eight dictionaries produced for endangered languages in this project, as reported at the annual meeting in 2012 of the American Association for the Advancement of Science (AAAS). The bilingual dictionary, in English and Siletz Dee-ni, with illustrations, will be used to teach the dialect to tribal members in the Siletz Valley. Such digital tools and social media can help small groups communicate. Professor Harrison said, "a positive effect of globalisation is that you can have a language that is spoken by only five or 50 people in one remote location, and now through digital technology that language can achieve a global voice and a global audience."
