= Oregon Route 130 =

State highway in Tillamook County, Oregon, US

Oregon Route 130
- Route 130 highlighted in red

Route information
- Maintained by ODOT
- Length: 9.40 mi (15.13 km)
- Existed: 2002–present

Major junctions
- West end: US 101 near Oretown
- East end: OR 22 in Dolph

Location
- Country: United States
- State: Oregon
- County: Tillamook

Highway system
- Oregon Highways; Interstate; US; State; Named; Scenic
← OR 127	→ OR 131

Oregon Route 130, known as the Little Nestucca Highway No. 130 (see Oregon highways and routes), is an American state highway in Oregon which runs through the Oregon Coast Range, between Oretown and Dolph. It is 9 miles (14 km) long.

== Route description ==
The western terminus of Oregon Route 130 is at intersection with U.S. Route 101 in Oretown, near Nestucca Bay. It then heads southeast from there along the Little Nestucca River, for 9 miles (14 km), until it ends at Oregon Route 22 in Dolph.

== History ==
Oregon Route 130 is a post-2002 number, and until recently did not have posted route markers. However, it appeared on the 2009-2011 official Oregon State Highway Map, and in November 2011 shields for 130 were posted at both its ends.

== Major intersections ==
The entire route is in Tillamook County.

Location	mi	km	Destinations	Notes
Nestucca Bay	0.00	0.00	US 101 (Oregon Coast Highway No. 9)	
Dolph	9.40	15.13	OR 22 (Three Rivers Highway No. 32)	
1.000 mi = 1.609 km; 1.000 km = 0.621 mi
