= Dolph, Oregon =

Unincorporated community in the state of Oregon, United States

Dolph
- Unincorporated community
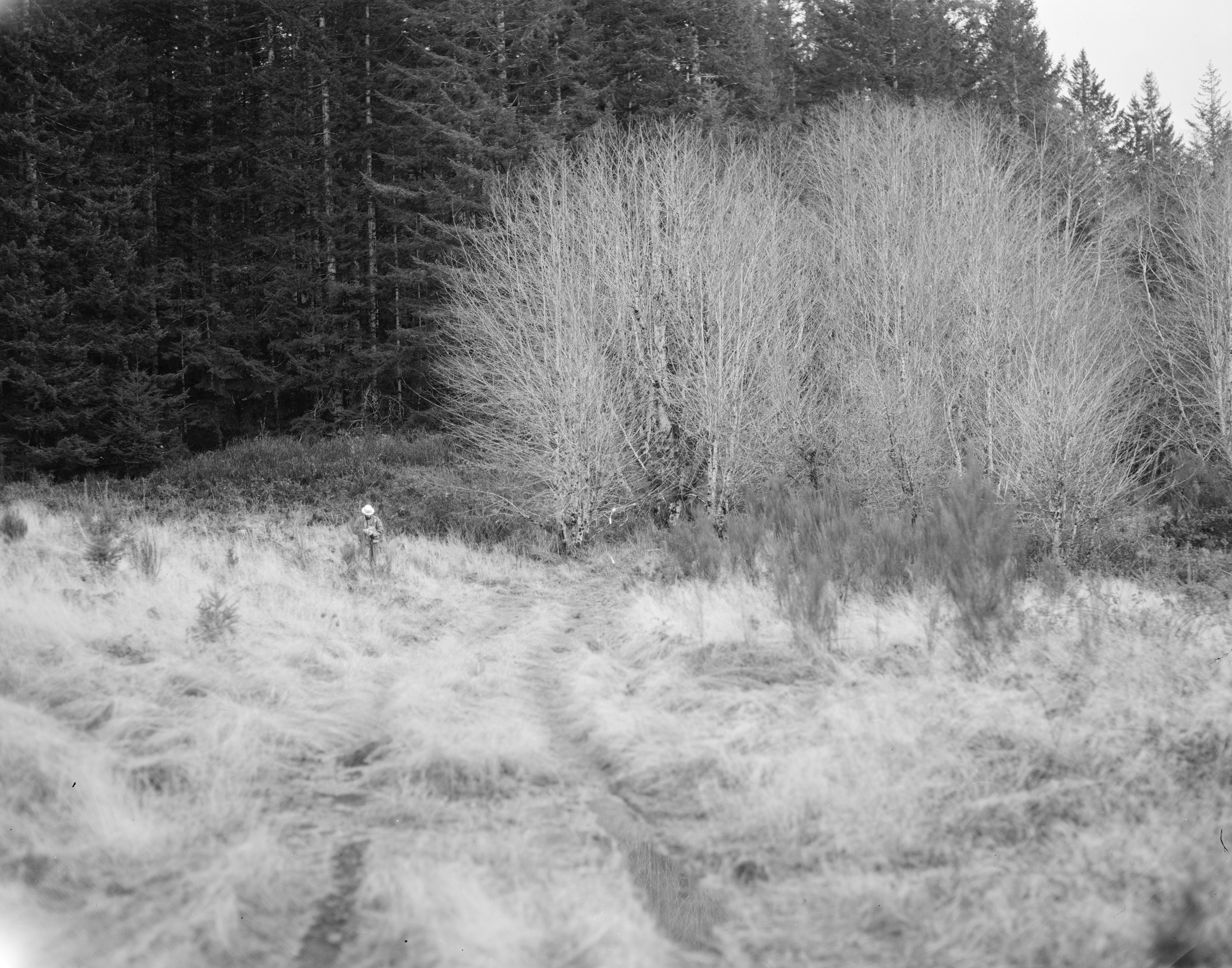
- Former Dolph townsite

- Location within the state of Oregon Dolph (the United States)
- Coordinates: 45°06′20″N 123°47′23″W
- Country: United States
- State: Oregon
- County: Tillamook
- Elevation: 436 ft (133 m)
- Time zone: UTC-8 (Pacific (PST))
  - Summer (DST): UTC-7 (PDT)
- GNIS feature ID: 1158211

Dolph (also known as Dolph Junction) is an unincorporated community in Tillamook County, Oregon, United States, near the Yamhill County line. It lies at the junction of Oregon Route 22 and Oregon Route 130 between Grande Ronde and Hebo, on the Little Nestucca River. It is within the Siuslaw National Forest in the Northern Oregon Coast Range.

Dolph was named for U.S. Senator Joseph N. Dolph. The original site of the community was at a toll gate and traveler's rest stop at the summit of the stagecoach road from the Willamette Valley to the Oregon Coast on the Tillamook-Yamhill county line. The county line was later moved west, so that the old town was in Yamhill County. The Dolph Toll Road, built by Jordan Fuqua between 1878 and 1882, went from Grand Ronde to Woods. Dolph post office opened there in 1886, and a school was started in 1889. At one time the community at the summit also had a hotel, a store, a sawmill, a barrel and stave factory, a livery stable, a blacksmith shop, and a campground.

About a half mile from the current site of Dolph at the junction of OR 22 and OR 130, there was another toll gate and the blacksmith shop of George Baxter, who maintained the road that followed the Little Nestucca River. Baxter also was the proprietor of a sulphur springs resort there.

In 1916–1917, a new public road was built from the Little Nestucca road over Sourgrass Summit to join the old road at the summit at Dolph. Because the new route to the coast was free, there was no longer a need to collect tolls and the town no longer had a reason to exist. As a result, the school was moved to west of OR 22 near Baxter's hot springs resort. The post office closed in 1921. Dolph school closed in 1930 when it was combined with the Castle Rock school to form Hebo School District. By the 1970s, nothing remained at the old town site but an apple orchard and a small cemetery on a hilltop a half a mile away.

Today there is also nothing left at the new town site at the junction, although as of 1940, there was still a hot springs resort near there. Photos show a store and hotel building at the highway junction as recently as the mid-1960s; it is now demolished.

== Polk County ==
There is also a historic locale named Dolph in Polk County; it was a station on the Southern Pacific Railroad. The station was also known as "Brown".
