= Tillamook people =

Native American tribe

Nehalem (Tillamook)
Total population
- 50 (1990)

Regions with significant populations
- United States (Oregon)

Languages
- English, formerly Tillamook

Religion
- traditional beliefs

Related ethnic groups
- Siletz

The Tillamook are a Native American tribe from coastal Oregon of the Salish linguistic group. The name "Tillamook" is a Chinook language term meaning "people of [the village] Nekelim (or Nehalem)", sometimes it is given as a Coast Salish term, meaning "Land of Many Waters". The Tillamook tribe consists of several divisions and dialects, including (from south to north):

- Siletz/Nachicolcho: (pronounced SIGH-lets): their name "Siletz" comes from the name of the Siletz River and Siletz Bay on which they lived; their own name is given as Se-la-gees ("[People on the] crooked river"), their name for the Siletz River is given as Nshlæch'/Nshlæts ("crooked river") or Nach'ikáltzu ("quiet river"), therefore their tribal name is given as Nshlæts'stiwat ("Crooked River People") or Nach'ikáltzustiwat ("Quiet River People").
- Salmon River/Nachesne/Nachesna: their name comes from the Salmon River on which they lived, both the river and the people were known as Nachesne/Nachesna.
- Nestucca/Nastucco/Nestugga: they lived on Little and Nestucca River and Nestucca Bay; their own name was Stagaush meaning "People of Saga", while "Nestucca/Nestugga" is the placename, meaning "People of Ne-staguash, i.e. Nestucca". (The placename identifier in this Salish Language is "Ne-" or "Na-", meaning land of or place of....)
- Tillamook Bay: their name comes from the Tillamook Bay, and the mouths of the Kilchis, Wilson, Trask, Miami and Tillamook rivers, which converge at the bay, and
- Nehalem: on Nehalem River

Estimated to have 2200 people at the beginning of the 18th century, the Tillamook lost population in the 19th century because of infectious diseases and murder by European Americans. In 1849 they were estimated to have 200 members. In 1856 they were forced to live on the Siletz Reservation with many other Tribes and Bands, the southern bands (Nestucca, Salmon River and Siletz River peoples') territory being largely within the 1855 boundaries of the Siletz Reservation. In 1898 the northern Tillamook (Nehalem and Tillamook Bay) and the Clatsop (Tlatsop / łät'cαp), (which means "place of dried salmon", a Lower Chinook-speaking tribe abutting their territory to the north and speaking the Nehalem-dialect, reflecting intermarriage with the northern Tillamook), were the first tribes to sue the United States government for compensation for aboriginal title to land it had taken from them without a ratified treaty or compensation. They were paid a settlement in 1907. Their descendants are now considered part of the Confederated Tribes of Siletz. Other Nehalem are part of the unrecognized Clatsop Nehalem Confederated Tribes.

== History ==
The Tillamook people traditionally lived in an area ranging from Tillamook Head in the north, to Cape Foulweather and extending to the summit of the Coast Range mountains. The first documented encounter of Europeans with the Tillamook was in 1788 by Robert Haswell, second mate on Robert Gray's ship. A second encounter was in late 1805 by the American Lewis and Clark Expedition, who were wintering at Fort Clatsop. They had reached the Pacific Coast while exploring beyond the extent of the newly acquired Louisiana Purchase for President Thomas Jefferson. Lewis and Clark estimated that the population was about 2200 when they encountered them.

A whale was washed ashore near the Tillamook village of Necost (in what is now Ecola State Park), and the Tillamook quickly stripped it of flesh, saving the flesh/blubber as food and the rendering oil for later use. After hearing of this, Lewis and Clark sought to trade for blubber. They received 300 pounds and some oil in exchange for trade goods. Lewis and Clark described a village of around 1000 people living in about 50 houses, estimating the entire population at around 2200. According to the expedition, the staple food source of the Tillamook was salmon. The people caught salmon during the annual salmon run of April to October, when the salmon went upstream in freshwater rivers from the ocean to spawn. The Tillamook ate some fresh and processed much of the fish to use throughout the year, preserving it by drying it and grinding it into a powder.

In 1824 and 1829, the tribe suffered high mortality in smallpox epidemics; this was a new infectious disease to them, introduced by contact with European peoples, among whom it was endemic. Native Americans suffered because they had no acquired immunity. The arrival of Oregon Trail settlers in 1841 and resulting conflicts over land and resources caused further population losses. By 1845 Wilkes estimated there were 400 Tillamook remaining. In 1849 Lane estimated 200 of the tribe survived.

During the early-mid 19th century, Chief Kilchis was the leader of the Tillamook people. Kilchis may have been a descendant of one of the survivors of a Spanish Manila Galleon that wrecked near Neahkahnie Mountain and the mouth of the Nehalem River. Known as the beeswax wreck, it was probably the Santo Cristo de Burgos, which was lost in 1693 while sailing from the Philippines to Mexico. Warren Vaughn, an early white settler in Tillamook, knew Kilchis and believed he was a descendant of one of the survivors of the wreck, and said that Kilchis himself claimed such ancestry.

In 1856 the federal government forced the Tillamook and more than 20 other remnant tribes to the Siletz Reservation. Additional population estimates are impossible as the tribes have intermarried and are no longer separately enumerated. In 1898 the Tillamook became the first tribe to sue the US government for compensation for the lands they had taken, along with the Clatsop. In 1907, along with two other tribes, they were awarded $23,500.

== Language ==
The Tillamook historically spoke Tillamook, a Salishan language, but gradually began to use English in greater amounts after European contact. The last fluent speaker of Tillamook died in 1970, rendering the language asleep. Between 1965 and 1972, in an effort to revitalize the language, a group of researchers from the University of Hawaiʻi interviewed the few remaining Tillamook and created a 120-page dictionary.

Early 20th-century anthropologist Franz Boas wrote, "The Tillamook Indians are the most southern branch of the Coast Salish. They live on the coast of the Pacific Ocean, and are separated from their more northern kinsmen by tribes speaking Chinookan languages. Their language is spoken two dialects, the Siletz and the Tillamook proper. It was first described and classified by Horatio Hale in the Publications of the Wilkes Expedition."

The name Tillamook was derived from Chinook people's references to them, referring to their place of settlement. It meant the people of Nekelim (pronounced Ne-elim). The latter name means the place Elim or, in the Cathlamet dialect, the place Kelim. This dialect differed from the northern dialects in its peculiar phonetics. Boas noted that the culture of the Tillamook seemed to have differed quite considerably from that of the northern Coast Salish, and has evidently been influenced by the culture of the tribes of northern California.

== Culture ==
According to the work of Franz Boas, the culture of the Tillamook tribe was significantly different from that of their Salish neighbors, evidently influenced by the tribes of northern California.

The Tillamook were skilled basket-weavers, and had a detailed mythology with links to existing events; the Story of the Thunderbird and Whale, for example, reflects the large earthquake in that region in 1700. The Tillamook divided their mythology into three categories; the earliest was the Myth Age, followed by the Age of Transformation, when the "South Wind" remade the land. The third age is the "period of true happenings", or events that happened in what the Tillamook considered recent history. Despite this, stories from the third age were considered just as much of a myth as those from the first or second.

The Tillamook exercised gender roles in numerous ways. During infancy, children were named at an ear-piercing ceremony where boys had their nasal septa pierced. If the infant had older siblings, they were required to stay away for at least a week for fear that their presence would swell the ear of the infant and cause its death. Throughout childhood, boys and girls were rarely punished. Certain activities were emphasized depending on the person's sex. A boy's first food kill and a girl's first gathered food were reserved for the elderly. At the onset of puberty, girls were secluded and underwent a series of ritual behaviors and food taboos. One such ritual was an all-night guardian spirit vigil in the woods, during which the girl repeatedly bathed in a cold stream in an attempt to gain guardian spirits. For boys, fasting and guardian spirit quests that included bathing became important. A boy's power and adult occupation were equated with the spirit he obtained through the quest. Boys and girls activated spirit powers acquired from their guardian only at middle age. Tillamook adults distinguished themselves further with fashion as both sexes painted their central hair part red, but men wore their hair in a single braid, while women would have two braids. Men and women also had tattoos and wore ear pendants according to their preference.

Marriages among the Tillamook were arranged with services being exchanged between the two families according to their status. Initial residence was in the groom's parents' village. If men acquired high status, they might have sought more than one wife. Illegitimate births were a common result of the arranged marriage process and led to a high occurrence of infanticide.

== Today ==
Some Nekelim people are enrolled in either the federally recognized Confederated Tribes of Siletz Indians of Oregon or the Confederated Tribes of the Grand Ronde Community of Oregon. Other Nehalem are part of the unrecognized Clatsop Nehalem Confederated Tribes. The Bald Point archaeological site preserves some aspects of the Tillamook culture. The city of Tillamook and Tillamook County in Oregon are named in the tribe's honor.

== See also ==
- Tsin-is-tum
