= W. H. Harrison (steam schooner) =

1890–1905 steamboat

History
- Name: W.H. Harrison
- Port of registry: Yaquina, Oregon (in 1893)
- In service: 1890
- Out of service: 1905
- Identification: U.S. 81291
- Fate: Wrecked at Alsea Bay, Oregon
- Notes: wooden construction

General characteristics
- Tonnage: 91.56 gross tons; 52.85 net tons
- Length: 92.6 ft (28.22 m)
- Beam: 20.1 ft (6.1 m)
- Depth: 6.8 ft (2.07 m) depth of hold
- Installed power: steam engine, 40 nominal horsepower
- Propulsion: propeller
- Sail plan: auxiliary schooner rig

W.H. Harrison was a steam schooner that operated from 1890 to 1905 on the coast of Oregon, the lower Columbia River, and southwest Washington state. At that time the salmon cannery industry was one of the major businesses of the coast. W.H. Harrison, while also carrying passengers and transporting general freight and lumber, was one of a number of steamers supplying materials to canneries along the coast, and transporting cases of canned salmon from the canneries.

== Construction ==
W.H. Harrison, generally called the Harrison in practice, was built at Alsea, Oregon in 1890 by Capt. Paul Schrader (born 1850). The vessel was 92.6 ft (28.22 m) long, with a beam of 20.1 ft (6.1 m), and depth of hold of 6.8 ft (2.1 m). The overall vessel size was 91.56 gross tons and 52.85 net tons. The official merchant vessel registry number was 81291.

On Tuesday, July 22, 1890, the steam schooner Augusta arrived in Marshfield, OR, from Tillamook carrying the machinery and boilers for the Harrison, and departed Coos Bay the next day for Alsea, where Harrison was then under construction. Augusta was another vessel that had been commanded by Paul Schrader.

The initial engine in the vessel had a 12-inch (30 cm) diameter cylinder and a low of 12 inches. By 1895 this had been replaced with a compound steam engine, with a high-pressure cylinder diameter of 11 inches (27.94 cm) and a low-pressure cylinder diameter of 22 inches (55.88 cm), with a stroke of 12 inches (30.48 cm).

== Operations ==
Thomas Latham was the first captain of the Harrison, and by 1895, he had been succeeded by Peter Crim and Thomas Neil.

In December, 1890, Harrison, bound for San Francisco, California with a load of lumber, was then days overdue. Overdue at the same time was the Struan, also carrying lumber. The steamer Montserrat reported encountering "several acres" of lumber off the coast, so much so that it took half an hour for Montserrat to pass through the drift. This was thought to be the cargo either of the Struan or of the Harrison. Later, Harrison was reported to have arrived safely.

Following stormy weather in the preceding week, Harrison arrived at Astoria on December 30, 1890 en route to Portland, Oregon from points on Shoalwater Bay.

Late Tuesday night, April 25, 1893, Harrison arrived in Astoria, Oregon, having departed the Nestucca River six days previously. After departing Nestucca, the steamer met a severe storm and was blown north past the Columbia bar almost to the mouth of the Quinault River in southwestern Washington state. Fuel was running short, so it was necessary to set sail, by which the vessel reached Shoalwater Bay, where a supply of wood for the boilers was obtained. Having replenished the fuel supply, Harrison proceeded to Astoria, where it was to load freight for Nehalem. Upon return, Harrison was scheduled to be overhauled, to have machinery improvements, and to be fitted to accommodate passengers.

== Tillamook and Nehalem route ==
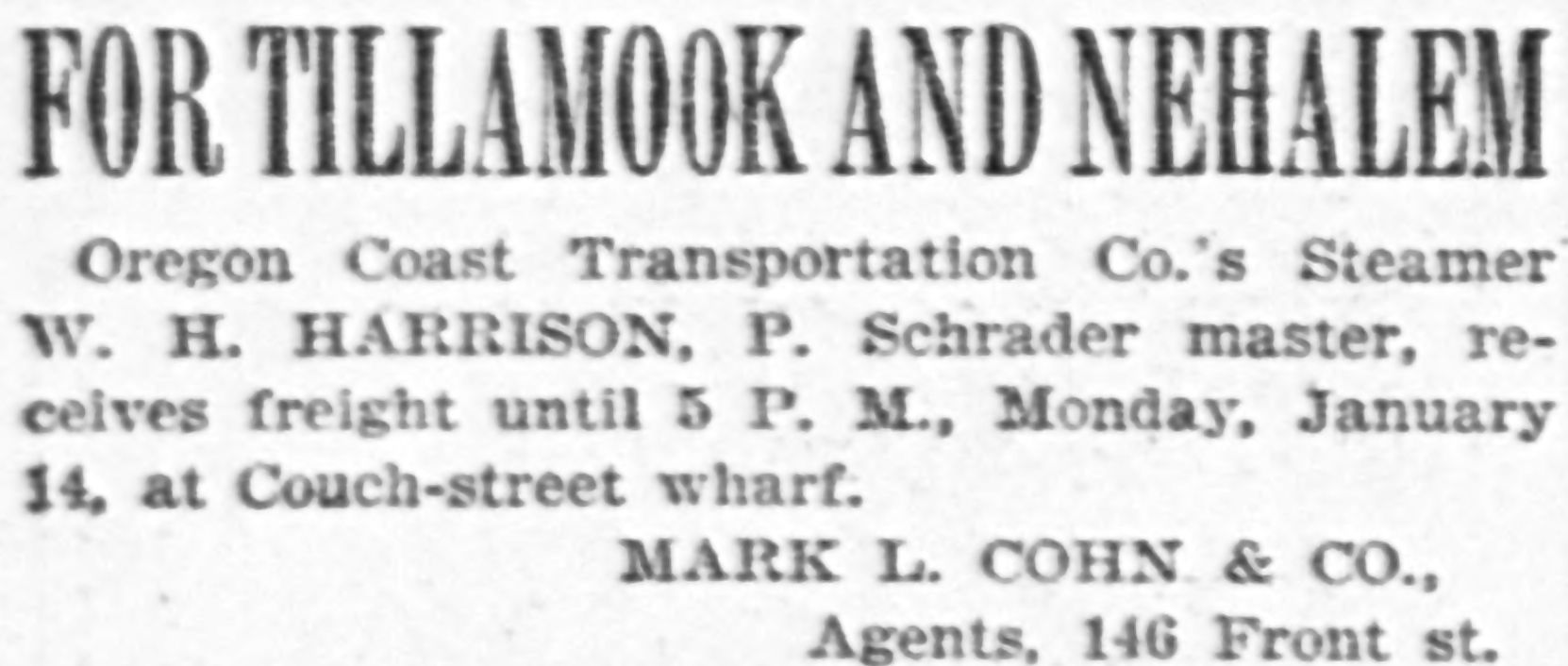
Advertisement in the Morning Oregonian, 1895.

Harrison was employed on a route running from Astoria to Nehalem and Tillamook. The route was often subject to weather delays. On November 5, 1894, Harrison arrived at Astoria, after having been barbound (unable to leave the harbor because of bad weather or a shifting channel) at Nehalem for two weeks.

Stormy weather off the Oregon coast in the winter of 1899–1900 restricted sea travel from Astoria to Tillamook. Harrison was only able to make one trip in November and one trip in December, 1899. As of January 16, 1900, Harrison had made no trips that month from Astoria to Tillamook.

The coast route also included service to Portland, Oregon, either by connecting river steamer or Harrison itself. As of January 1895, under Captain P. Schrader, Harrison was running for the Oregon Coast Transportation Company, and scheduled to depart from Portland to Tillamook and Nehalem, receiving freight at Portland's Couch Street wharf on the Willamette River until 5 p.m. on Monday, January 14, 1895. Mark L. Cohn & Co., of 146 Front Street, were the agents for Harrison. On Wednesday, May 10, 1899, weather permitting, Harrison was scheduled to sail for Tillamook, Garibaldi, Bay City, and Hobsonville, running in conjunction with the Columbia river sternwheeler R.R. Thompson, which at that time was employed in carrying passenger and cargo to Astoria from points on the lower Columbia River.

== Rescues and assistance to other vessels ==
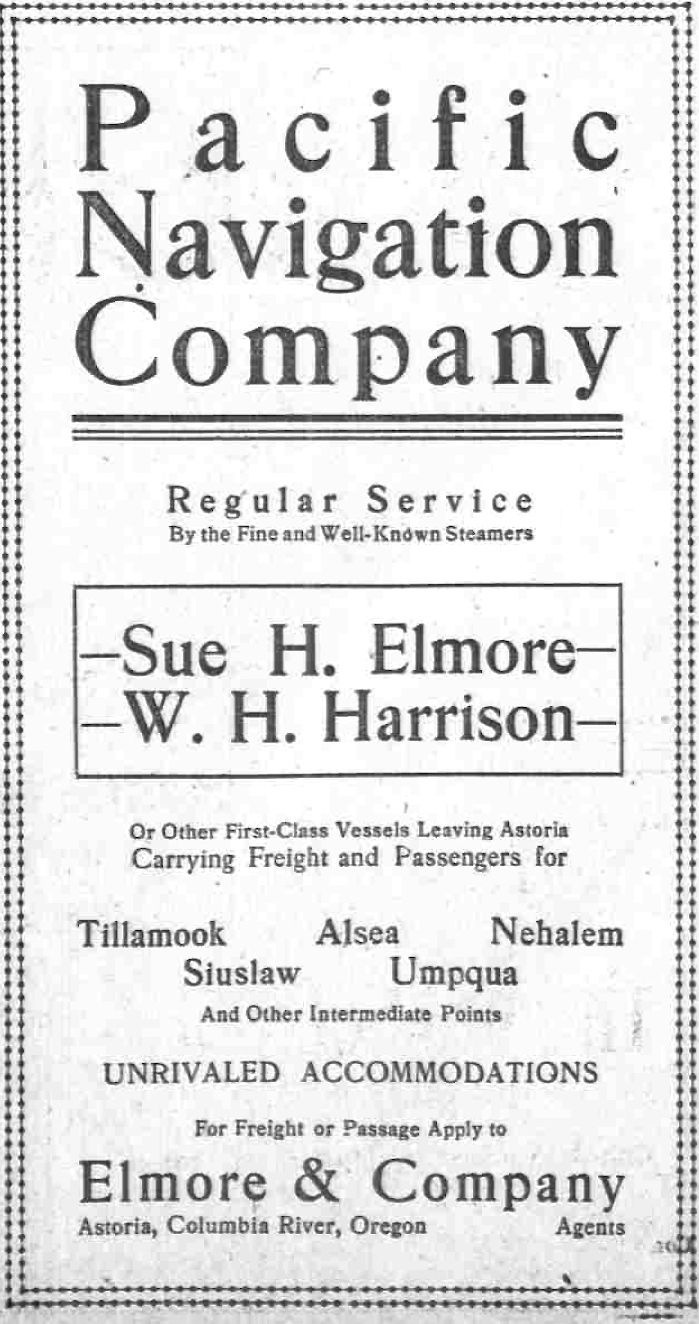
Advertisement for Sue H. Elmore and W.H. Harrison, 1904.

Harrison was occasionally in a position to render assistance to other vessels in distress.

=== Assistance to schooner Mary Bidwell ===
On September 6, 1893, under Capt. P.H. Crim, Harrison, with 40 passengers on board, encounted the schooner Mary Bidwell 10 miles (16 km) south of the Siuslaw River and 8 mi (13 km) out to sea. Bidwell was flying the union reversed and displaying other distress signals. Crim brought Harrison alongside, and the mate of Bidwell came over in a boat. The mate reported that the schooner, with a crew of six men on board, had departed San Francisco 37 days before, and the men on board were in a state of starvation. They had become lost and had been sailing around in the fog off the mouth of the Siuslaw for ten days. Although the fog potentially impeded Harrison's own chance of making port, Crim transferred twenty pounds (9.1 kg) of pork, potatoes, tea, biscuits and thirty US gallons (110 L; 25 imp gal) of water to Bidwell, and gave the schooner directions to a reach a position near the beach where, when the fog lifted, the schooner could be seen by the tugs. The crew of the Bidwell offered to present an order chargeable against the Bidwell's owners for the value of the food, but Captain Crim refused to accept it, saying he only wished that he could have done more.

=== Towing of the bark Swanmore ===
On the afternoon of Sunday, November 18, 1894, Harrison, having departed Nehalem bound for Astoria with Captain Schrader in charge, encountered the large British bark Swanmore flying distress signals and nearly in the breakers off Cape Falcon. Harrison picked up a steel hawser from the bark and commenced towing Swanmore away from the surf to a point 15 miles (24 km) off shore. Harrison then proceeded to Astoria, arriving on Monday morning, November 19, and alerted the tug Relief, which proceed out to Swanmore. The captain of the Swanmore said that he'd agreed with Schrader to charge $900 for the tow, but Schrader said there hadn't been any time for bargaining.

== Cannery tender service ==
On Saturday, November 30, 1895, Harrison arrived at Florence, Oregon from Astoria and loaded a cargo of salmon and cannery supplies from the Rose Hill cannery, owned by the Florence Canning Company. Harrison departed Florence on Monday, December 2, 1895, with the cannery crew, consisting of about 35 Chinese workers and 20 fishermen on board, who were to be transported to Astoria as soon as possible.

At noon on Thursday, September 25, 1902, under Captain Leatham, Harrison departed Astoria for Yaquina Bay with a load of canning supplies. During the voyage south down the coast, the steamer encountered a strong gale blowing from the south, but Captain Leatham kept the vessel on course into the wind until, about 15 miles (24 km) from Yaquina, the Harrison was found to be leaking so badly that all its pumps could only just keep up with the leakage. Leatham then decided to turn around and run before the wind back to Astoria. Normally in proceeding into a strong wind, Harrison would have hoisted a jib sail to steady the vessel, but the one on board at the time was old and could not be relied upon to hold up in winds as strong as Harrison encountered that day. The cause of the leakage was not immediately known, but it was believed that the seams may have opened in the ship's hull, or some of its keel or rudder bolts worked loose.

On August 27, 1904, while en route to the Siletz River with a load of cannery supplies valued at $10,000, Harrison lost its rudder off the Siulaw river. Harrison returned safely to the Umpqua River. It was reported that arrangement had been made for the Sue H. Elmore, another steamer owned by the Elmore Company, to proceed from Astoria to Umpqua to tow back Harrison to Astoria for repairs. Harrison was back in service by September 8, 1904, departing that day from Astoria for Nehalem.

Harrison was scheduled to depart on Wednesday, September 3, 1902, from Astoria to Alsea, with a load of supplies for the Elmore cannery there. It was reported that in the next few months Harrison would be used as cannery tender along the coast.

== Sale of Harrison ==
On July 2, 1900, a bill of sale was filed with the Astoria customs house, showing that Paul Schrader had sold W.H. Harrison to the Pacific Navigation Company for $6,000.

== Wrecked at Alsea bar ==
The Yaquina bay station, and crew, of the U.S. Lifesaving Service, circa 1905.

Harrison arrived at Newport, Oregon from Umpqua, under Captain P.O. Hansen, on Wednesday, September 20, 1905, with a load of cannery supplies intended to go to the Elmore & Co. cannery at Alsea Bay. Harrison then proceeded to Alsea Bay, but upon arriving the same Wednesday mooring, Captain Hansen found the sea breaking too heavily over the Alsea bar to risk a crossing, and so they returned to Yaquina.

By the afternoon of Friday, September 22, 1905, the sea seemed to have become more tranquil, so Captain Hansen took Harrison back out into the ocean to make the run to Alsea. Arriving at Alsea, the improved sea conditions led Captain Hansen to decide to take the vessel in. However, in crossing the bar, Harrison struck ground hard, and was driven onto the sand spit on the south side of the bay entrance, about one-quarter mile from shore. When all efforts to get the vessel off failed, part of the crew launched one of the ship's lifeboats, and were able to reach the shore safely. Captain Hansen and two sailors remained on board.

When it was seen from the shore that the steamer was in distress, word was passed to the Yaquina Bay life-saving station, which was about 13 miles (21 km) away and 8 miles (13 km) out. The keeper of the life-saving station, Captain Otto Wellander, and his crew responded overland, securing two teams of horses to pull the carts containing their beach rescue gear and the station's surfboat south down the beach and on the narrow wagon road around Seal Rocks, arriving at the wreck scene about 3 hours after having received word.

According to a newspaper report of at the time, at daylight the life-saving crew took the surfboat out to the Harrison, and took off Captain Harrison. The two sailors however wanted to remain on boat to save their personal effects, but they were taken off later in the day. The steamer was badly battered in the surf, and was expected that the vessel would go to pieces during the night, as the surf was increasing in size and a hard wind was blowing all day from the southwest. The cargo also was expected to be a total loss.

According to the official life-saving service report, Harrison had been stranded 14 miles (23 km) south of the station and about 350 yards offshore. The keeper was informed of the stranding by telegraph and telephone. The life-saving crew proceeded to the sea in wagons, and arrived at 2:10 a.m. Part of the crew of the Harrison was already ashore, but the master and three men remained on board. The following day the life-saving crew took the master off to communicate with his agent, Elmore & Co. At 1:00 pm, when the tide was out, a wagon was driven out on the spit near the stranded vessel, the three men remaining on board were taken off, and the baggage belonging to the sailors was hauled ashore. After the rescue, on September 30, 1905, Captain Hansen, Elmore & Co., and, on behalf of the underwriters, W.S. Cleverdon, send a letter expressing their appreciation for the services of the life-saving crew, and enclosing as a memento, the wheel of the Harrison.

On September 25, 1905, it was reported that Harrison had broken in two. The estimated value of the steamer was $10,000. The estimated value of the cargo was $2,500.
