= Siletz Dee-ni =

Siletz Dee-ni may refer to:

- Confederated Tribes of Siletz Indians, a federally recognized Indian tribe of Oregon
- Tolowa language, the traditional language of the tribe

== See also ==
- Siletz language
