= Hobsonville, Oregon =

Unincorporated community in the state of Oregon, United States

Hobsonville
- Unincorporated community
- Location within the state of Oregon Hobsonville (the United States)
- Coordinates: 45°32′56″N 123°54′07″W
- Country: United States
- State: Oregon
- County: Tillamook
- Elevation: 131 ft (40 m)
- Time zone: UTC-8 (Pacific (PST))
  - Summer (DST): UTC-7 (PDT)
- GNIS feature ID: 1121860

Hobsonville is an unincorporated community in Tillamook County, Oregon, United States. Although it is considered a ghost town, it is still classified as a populated place by the United States Geological Survey (USGS). Hobsonville is on the east shore of Tillamook Bay, about 2 miles south of Garibaldi via U.S. Route 101 or about a mile from Garibaldi across Miami Cove.

== History ==
The community was named after pioneer John Hobson, who was one of the founders of the local salmon cannery. Hobsonville once had an economy based on lumber and the salmon cannery–the Tillamook Packing Company–which began operating in 1884. Hobsonville also had a hotel and a creamery, and was a stop on the Tillamook Bay and Pacific Railway and Navigation Co. Railroad. Hobsonville post office ran from 1883 to 1913. According to Oregon: End of the Trail, nearby Hobsonville Point that extends into Tillamook Bay was named Talapus Cradle by the local Native Americans because of its resemblance to a cradleboard. The point was also once known as Driscoll Point.

By 1930, Hobsonville was the home of several elderly Tillamook and Nehalem women, who talked with May Edel, an assistant to anthropologist Franz Boas. By 1940 the townsite was overgrown by alder trees but several buildings and the unoccupied hotel building remained. Shortly before 1940 the remains of the Smith lumber mill were washed into the bay.

== See also ==
- Sue H. Elmore
- W.H. Harrison (steam schooner)
