= Cape Kiwanda State Natural Area =

State natural area in Oregon, United States

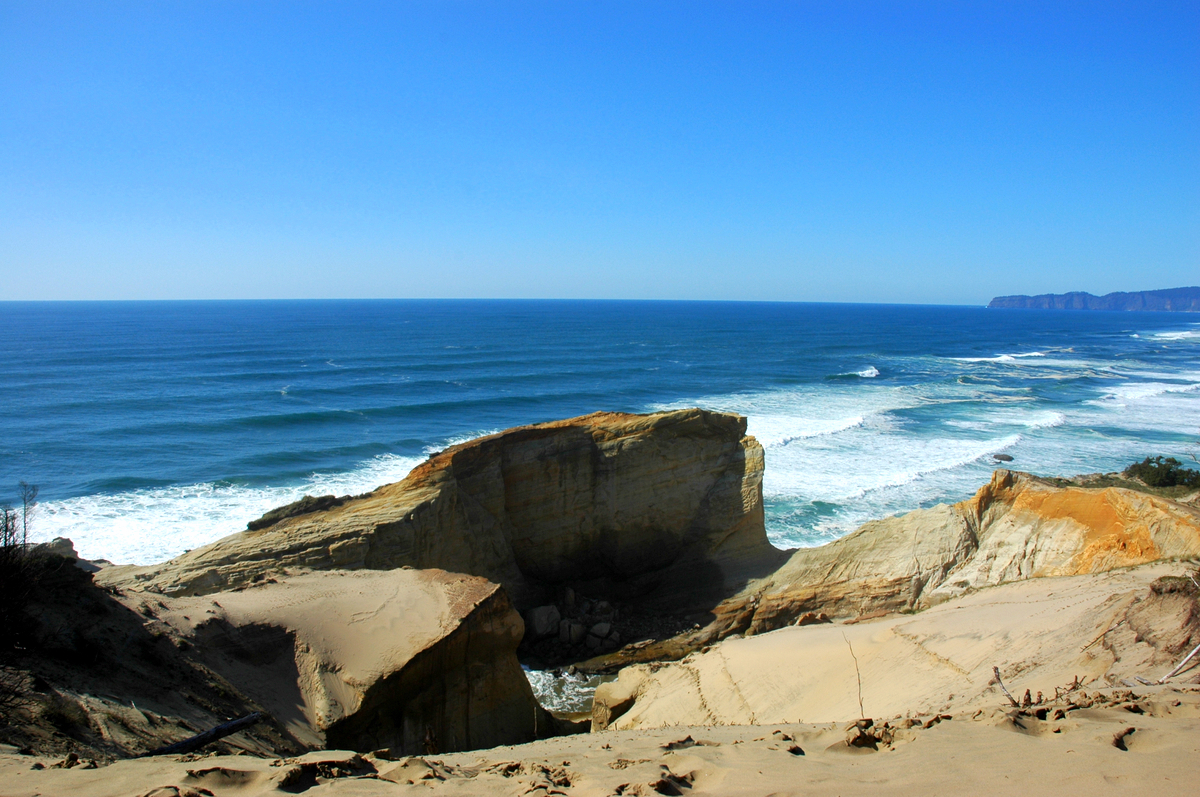
- A view from Cape Kiwanda

- Location within Oregon Location within the United States
- Interactive map of Cape Kiwanda State Natural Area
- Type: State public
- Location: Tillamook County, Oregon
- Nearest city: Tillamook
- Coordinates: 45°12′59″N 123°58′19″W

Cape Kiwanda State Natural Area is a state park in Pacific City, Oregon, United States. Cape Kiwanda is on the Three Capes Scenic Route, which includes Cape Meares and Cape Lookout. Hiking to the top of Cape Kiwanda allows views of Nestucca Bay to the south and Cape Lookout to the north.

A sea stack, named "Chief Kiawanda Rock", is located 1/2 mile (0.80 km) southwest of the cape. It is one of three features along the Oregon Coast that are called "Haystack Rock", though the one in Cannon Beach is more widely known.

One of the attractions, called the Duckbill, in the park was destroyed by vandals in August 2016.

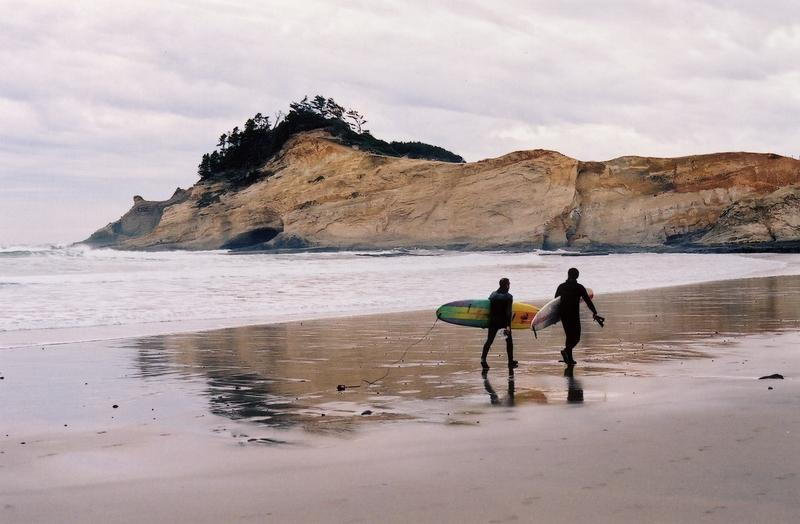
The cape from the beach in Pacific City, November 2004

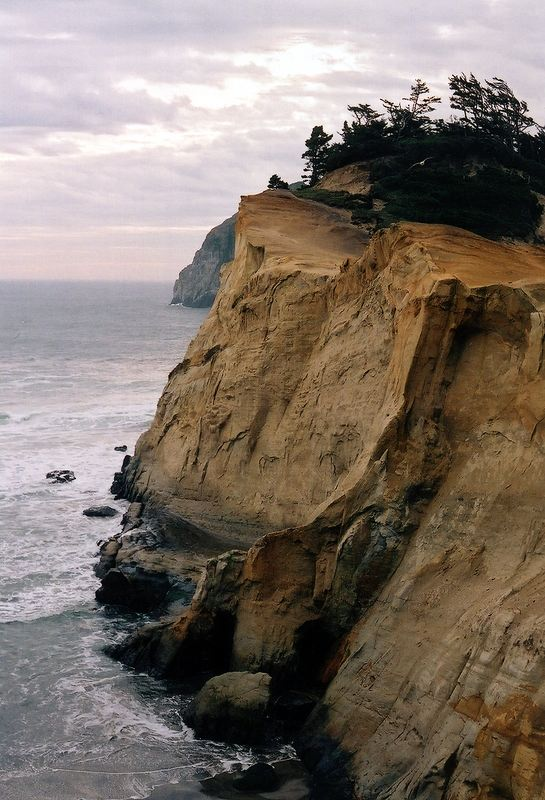
View from the trail on Cape Kiwanda

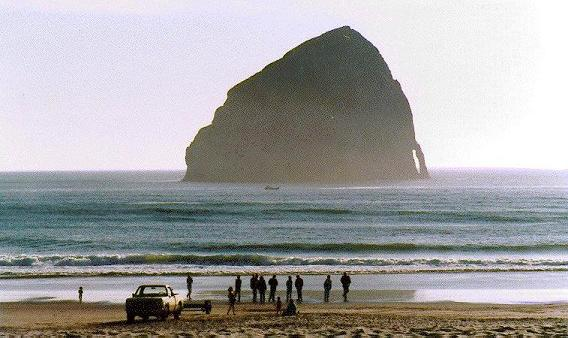
Chief Kiwanda Rock

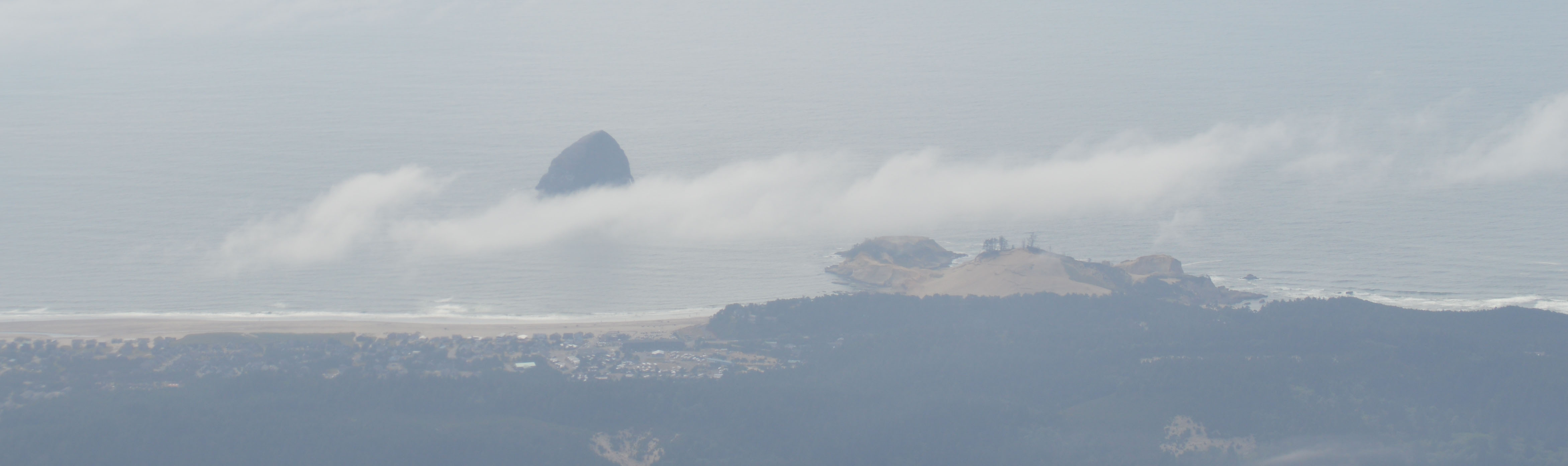
Aerial View of Cape Kiwanda State Natural Area

== Geology ==
Cape Kiwanda is an unusual promontory in that it is composed primarily of sandstone of the Astoria Formation. At one time, the promontory likely stretched roughly 1/2 mile (0.80 km) to the southwest, connecting to Chief Kiwanda Rock, an intrusive basalt sea stack that is Miocene in age. The basalt and basaltic-sandstone dike on the south side of the cape helped shield the softer sandstone from harsh winter waves coming from the southwest. Erosion on the flanks of the cape finally separated the basalt from the sandstone, isolating it as a sea stack. With the basalt's protection gone, the tip of Cape Kiwanda retreated to its current location. While Chief Kiwanda Rock still absorbs some of the impact from southwest storms, the cape is rapidly eroding by waves undercutting along the sea cliffs and by rock fall.

Cape Kiwanda, with its many tide pools, small inlets, natural arches and deep chasms, is a stunning example of large-scale erosional sculpting in sandstone. Remnants of huge Holocene-era parabolic dunes that cover the highest parts of Cape Kiwanda add to the scenic interest of the locality. This unique geological feature is a must see and is one of the most photogenic landforms along the Oregon Coast.

== See also ==
- List of Oregon state parks
- Haystack Rock in Cannon Beach, Clatsop County
