= Duckbill =

Duckbill may refer to:

- Platypus, Ornithorhynchus anatinus
- Duckbill catfish, Sorubim lima
- Duckbill dinosaurs, family Hadrosauridae
- Duckbill fishes, family Percophidae
- Duckbill eels, family Nettastomatidae
- Duckbill choke, a shotgun accessory
- Duckbill valve, a valve used to prevent back flow
- Duckbill (rock formation), Oregon
- Duckbill mask

== See also ==
- Bird's beak
- Duck
