= Sue H. Elmore =

Steamboat

- Sue H. Elmore sometime between 1900 and 1917.

History
- Name: Sue H. Elmore, later Bergen, and Cuyamaca
- Owner: Pacific Navigation Co., others later
- Port of registry: Astoria, Oregon, other places later
- Builder: Joseph Supple, Portland, Oregon
- Launched: June 30, 1900
- Maiden voyage: Sep. 21, 1900
- Out of service: early 1950s
- Identification: 116997
- Notes: wooden construction

General characteristics
- Type: Coastal passenger, freighter, tow and tug
- Tonnage: 232 gross tons; 131 net tons
- Length: 90.7 ft (27.65 m)
- Beam: 23.8 ft (7.25 m)
- Depth: 8.0 ft (2.44 m) depth of hold
- Decks: one
- Installed power: Steam engine, later gasoline and diesel
- Propulsion: Propeller
- Sail plan: Auxiliary schooner
- Speed: 9 knots (17 kilometres per hour; 10 miles per hour) average
- Crew: 11 exclusive of master
- Notes: Operated by U.S. Army during World War 2 under name ST-361.

Sue H. Elmore was a steamboat built for service on the coast of Oregon and southwest Washington. From 1900 to 1917, the vessel's principal route ran from Portland, Oregon down the Columbia River to Astoria, and then west across the Columbia Bar, then south along the Oregon coast to Tillamook Bay. Once at Tillamook Bay, Sue H. Elmore was one of the few vessels that could reach Tillamook City at the extreme southern edge of the mostly very shallow bay. After this Sue H. Elmore was sold, being operated briefly in Puget Sound under the name Bergen, and then for many years, out of San Diego, California as a tugboat under the name Cuyamaca. During World War II Cuyamaca was acquired by the U.S. Army which operated the vessel as ST-361. Afterwards the army sold ST-361 and the vessel returned to civilian ownership, again under the name Cuyamaca. In 1948 Cuyamaca sank in a harbor in Venezuela, but was raised and by the early 1950s, was owned by one A. W. Smith, of Pensacola, Florida. This vessel's former landing place in Tillamook, Oregon is now a municipal park named after the ship.

== Design ==
Sue H. Elmore was built for the Pacific Navigation Company, which was closely linked to the S. Elmore Canning Company, with the wealthy businessman Samuel Elmore (1847–1910) being president of both concerns. The steamer was named after Samuel Elmore's eldest daughter. This vessel was generally called Elmore.

The intended use for the vessel was to establish regular steamship service between Tillamook, on the coast of Oregon, and Portland. Up until that time the bad navigation conditions at the entrance, called a "bar", to Tillamook Bay, had made it not always possible to make regular trips. The new steamer, generally called Elmore in practice, was designed by Capt. Paul Schrader (born 1850), who was also a stockholder in the Pacific Navigation Company. Sue H. Elmore was also intended replace of the company's former steamer, R.T. Elmore, which had been sold and taken to Alaska.

Schrader had over 20 years experience on the Tillamook route, and incorporated this experience into the design of the vessel. The steamer was "especially designed for barred harbor and coasting trade." The Elmore was intended to carry a big load of freight on a light draft on the shallow waters of Tillamook Bay. Elmore was also equipped to carry passengers. It was also built for service along the Oregon coast to the salmon-packing plants of the S. Elmore Cannery Co.

== Construction ==
Construction was done at the shipyard of Joseph Supple in Portland, Oregon, where the keel for the new steamer was laid on May 15, 1900. Construction proceeded rapidly. The vessel was launched on Saturday, June 30, 1900, at 2:00 pm. Machinery still had to be installed. On July 9, 1900, the Elmore was towed downriver to the Willamette Iron Works for the boilers and machinery to be installed. There had been a delay in the construction at the Supple yard, which mean that the vessel could not be finished before August 1, 1900, at the earliest. Elmore was scheduled to make its trial trip on September 15, 1900, and Samuel Elmore came to Portland to be on board for the occasion.

== Specifications ==
=== Dimensions ===
According to a news report in 1900, Sue H. Elmore was 100 feet long, 21 foot beam, with a maximum draft, when fully loaded, of 8 feet. The steamer measured out at 232 gross tons and 131 net tons. Tonnage was a measure of carrying capacity and not of weight. The official figures for the vessel were somewhat different, giving a length of 90.7 feet, beam of 23.8, and depth of hold of 8.0 feet. When unloaded ("light") Sue H. Elmore drew 5.5 feet of water forward and 8.0 feet aft. When loaded, the vessel drew 8 feet forward and 10 feet aft.

=== Machinery ===
The engine, built by Willamette Iron and Steel Works, was a fore and aft compound condensing type steam engine, with cylinder sizes of 10, 20 and 20 inches and a 20-inch stroke, generating 100 nominal horsepower and 300 indicated horsepower, could turn the propeller shaft at 125 revolutions per minute. The boiler installed in 1900 was larger than usual, and generated steam at 150 pounds of pressure. An electric lighting plant was installed. In 1919, if not before, the vessel was an oil-burner.

The ship had double steam winches mounted both fore and aft, cargo ports, and the latest freight handling machinery. Three life boats of a type then considered modern and improved were carried, as well as a life raft. The ship carried patent anchors, had an auxiliary schooner sailing rig, and was fitted with towing bits. Cruising speed downriver on the Columbia was said to have been easily maintained at 10 knots. The average speed however was stated in 1917 to be 9 knots.

In 1914 a new boiler was installed. The new boiler, made by Kingsford Foundry & Machine Works, was a Scotch marine type that was 8 feet long and 10.5 feet in diameter, generated steam at 160 pounds working pressure.

=== Accommodations and official designation ===
The interior of the vessel, when new, was said to have been "arranged with excellent taste" and there were sufficient staterooms to accommodate 25 passengers. The official merchant registry number was 116997. The vessel's flag recognition signal letters were K.Q.H.W.

== Placed in service ==
On Friday afternoon, at 4:00 pm, September 21, 1900, Elmore arrived at Astoria from Portland, where the new steamer attracted attention. The steamer tied up at the wharf of the Oregon Railway and Navigation Company on the 22nd, and was scheduled to start regular freight and passenger service the following day, September 23, 1900, between Astoria and Tillamook. Captain Schrader (born 1850) (or Schroeder) was in command of the ship at that time. In one of its first runs from Tillamook, the Elmore arrived in Astoria on the morning of October 1, 1900, with 1100 cases of salmon, 500 boxes of butter and about 200 cases of cheese. Captain Schrader is reported to have said the vessel was performing well.

== Operations on the Oregon coast ==
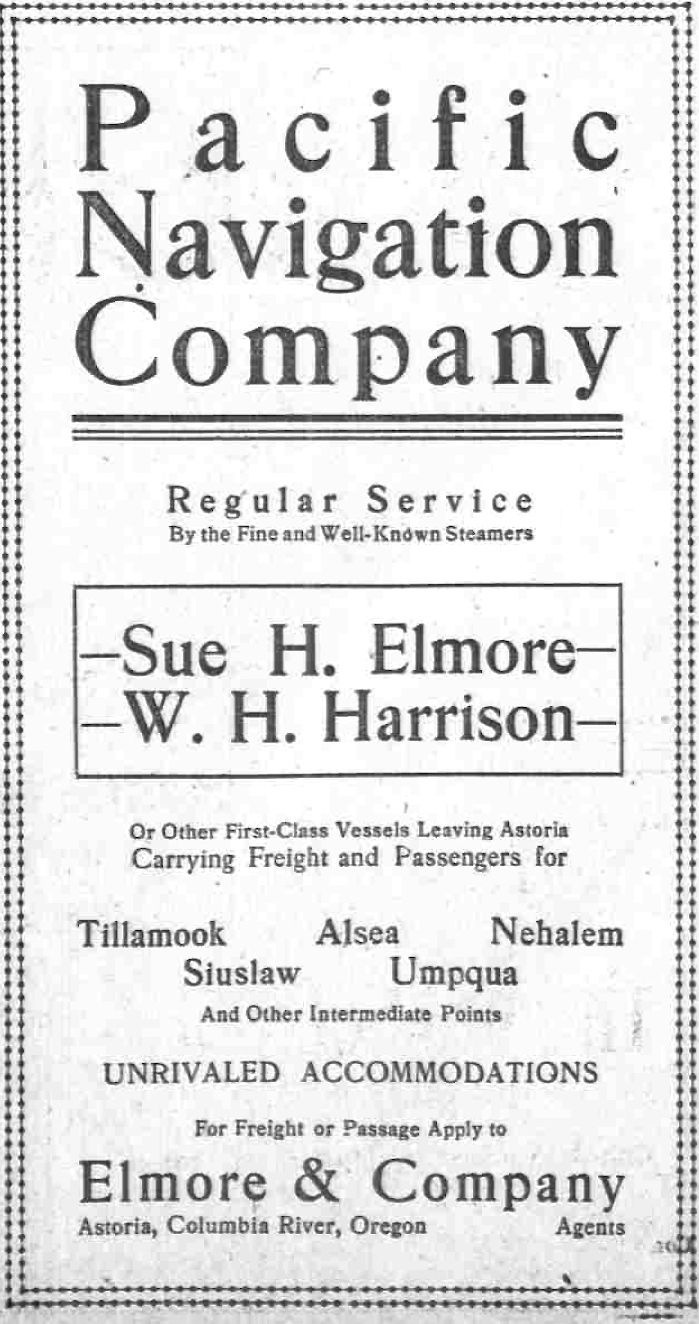
Advertisement for Sue H. Elmore and W.H. Harrison, 1904

In May 1901, the Pacific Navigation Company, operating the steamers Sue H. Elmore and the W.H. Harrison, was the only shipping line running from Astoria to points on Tillamook Bay, including Tillamook City, Garibaldi, Bay City, Bay City. and Hobsonville. The line's steamers made rail connections at Astoria with the Oregon Railroad & Navigation Company and the Astoria & Columbia River Railroad. Samuel Elmore & Co. were the general agents for Pacific Navigation Co.

On February 21, 1901, Elmore arrived at Astoria with 3037 cases of salmon from the cannery on the Siuslaw River. Elmore had had to wait for 10 days at the Siuslaw river for high tides to allow it to cross the Siuslaw bar.

In December 1907, the Pacific Navigation Company advertised itself as the only freight and passenger steamship line between Astoria and Tillamook, Nehalem, Nestucca, Siletz, Yaquina, Alsea, Siuslaw, and Umpqua, Oregon. Also running with Elmore under the line were the steamers Gerald C. and Evie.

=== Marine route to Tillamook ===
Elmore's designated route had been to reach Tillamook City, which was about 2.75 miles up a shallow winding waterway known as Hoquarten Slough, which had been dredged by the Corps of Engineers but only to a depth of 9 feet on mean high tide. During the year ending December 31, 1900, there were a total of 111 arrivals and departures by a total of 10 coasting vessels (sailing and steam) crossing the Tillamook Bar.

Only two steamers, Elmore and the slightly smaller W.H. Harrison (of which Capt. Schrader had once been master), and two sailing vessels, arrived at or departed from Tillamook City during the year. Of the 71 arrivals and departures from Tillamook City in 1900, W.H. Harrison accounted for 48, and Sue H. Elmore, being new on the route, accounted for only 8.

In 1902, there were a total of three vessels, all steamers which crossed the Tillamook bar and either arrived at or departed from Tillamook City. These steamers made a total of 198 arrivals and departures, divided among them as follows: Sue H. Elmore, 89, Geo. R. Vosburg, 99, and W.H. Harrison, 4.

In 1904, eight vessels crossed the Tillamook bar and proceeded to or departed from Tillamook City, including three steamers, Sue H. Elmore, W.H. Harrison, Geo. R. Vosburg, one gasoline-engined vessel, and four sailing vessels. There were a total of 127 arrivals and departures at Tillamook City during 1904, of which Elmore and Vosburg accounted for the vast majority, with 86 and 25 arrivals and departures respectively.

In 1906, the only regular shipping line running to Tillamook was the Pacific Navigation Company, owners of Sue B. Elmore. There were only five commercial shipping vessels which crossed the Tillamook bar in 1906, two of which were smaller, Robarts (24 net tons) and George R. Vosberg (65 net tons). Only three vessels larger than 100 net tons crossed the bar in 1906, the Elmore, Abbie (138 net tons), and Coquille River (265 net tons).

=== Cargos and passengers transported on Tillamook route ===
Steamers W.H. Harrison and Sue H. Elmore at Tillamook, Oregon, sometime between 1900 and 1906.

In 1900, shipments into the bay totaled 3,415 tons, comprising 2,415 tons of general merchandise, 600 tons of machinery and implements, and 400 tons of flour and feed. Shipments out of the bay in 1900 totaled 14,225 tons comprising 10,565 tons lumber (7,390,000 board feet) and 3,640 tons of dairy products, produce, fish, chittim bark, and hides. A total of 1,198 passengers arrived and departed the bay by sea during 1900.

In 1902, freight shipments were similar to those in 1900. Freight shipped into the bay during 1902 totaled 4,067 tons, and consisted of coal, fruit, grain, feed, and flour, hay, machinery, wool and woolen goods, and miscellaneous merchandise. Freight shipped out of the bay in 1902 totaled 20,826 tons: dairy products, eggs, fish, laths, lumber (the vast majority at 19,327 tons), vegetables and miscellaneous merchandise. There were a total of 1,702 passengers arriving and departing by sea during 1902.

In 1906, 13,637 tons of freight were shipped out of Tillamook Bay. About 90% of this freight originated from the city of Tillamook, and most of that was carried by Sue H. Elmore. This was a substantial decrease from the freight shipped in previous years.

== Operations on the Washington coast ==
On July 30, 1901, Elmore was scheduled to depart, apparently from Portland, with a barge-mounted pile driver in tow for the Quilayute River, in Clallam County, Washington, where M.J. Kinney, a Columbia river cannery owner, was enlarging his salmon packing plant. On January 7, 1903, Sue H. Elmore arrived at Aberdeen, Washington and began loading about 8,000 cases of canned salmon to be carried to Astoria.

In 1904, the Pacific Navigation Company provided steamship service, using Sue H. Elmore, W.H. Harrison, or "other first-class vessels", to Tillamook, Alsea, Nehalem, Siuslaw, Umpqua and other intermediate points on the Oregon coast. The company advertised its steamers as providing "unrivaled accommodations."

== Groundings, collision, and other incidents ==
In October 1903, when entering Tillamook Bay, Elmore struck ground on the bar several times, splintering the keel towards the stern of the vessel, losing the rudder stock, and causing the ship to leak around the stern. When Elmore returned to Astoria, the ship was beached for a partial inspection by the Lloyd's agent. This was not sufficient to determine the full extent of the damage, so the ship was ordered to proceed to Portland. The ship was fully insured. The underwriters were M.C. Harrison & Co. It was initially thought that the damage would cost about $3,000 to repair. The ship was taken to the Supple yard in Portland for extensive repairs. The work was scheduled to be completed by Monday, November 2, 1903, and consisted of a new keel, a new propeller, new planking, and a thorough painting.

At 10:30 a.m. on April 12, 1904, while en route from Tillamook Bay to Tillamook City, the steamer Sue H. Elmore collided with the steamer Geo. R. Vosburg. There was no injury to any passenger or damage to cargo. The estimate value of the damage was $150 to Elmore and $200 to Vosburg. The case was investigated on April 25, 1904, and as a result the license of master of Vosburg, E. Loll, was suspended for 30 days for carelessness and unskillfulness. The master of Elmore was exonerated.

On March 1, 1906, in Tillamook, the cook on board Sue H. Elmore was fined $130 for violating a local option law prohibiting the sale of alcohol.

On March 6, 1910, while making a landing at Garibaldi, Elmore's propeller struck a rock, which broke the propeller shaft outside of the stern bearing, causing an estimated $400 worth of damage.

In February 1913, former captain Edward Anderson was arrested in Seattle on charges from Astoria that he had forged the name of an engineer on Elmore, B. L. Miller, on the engineer's pay check, and then cashed it.

== Campaign for federal waterway improvements ==
Sue H. Elmore entering Tillamook.

Although Elmore had been specially designed to reach Tillamook City by way of Hoquarten Slough, there were still difficulties. Because the slough was no more than 10 feet deep, steamers had to leave Tillamook City at nearly high tide. Sometimes steamers were not able to reach the bar in time to cross on the same tide. This forced a delay as the steamer was required to wait inside the bay for the next high tide. On other occasions, steamers were delayed by days and even weeks on account of heavy seas on the Tillamook and Columbia River bars.

In 1906, local interests sought federal funding to deepen the channel and eliminate several sharp curves in Hoquarten Slough, but the Department of War recommended against this on the grounds that the volume of commerce was too low to justify the expenditure, and much of the traffic would be subsumed in a few years by a rail line then under construction. The War Department did believe that expenditures to maintain the present depth of the Hoquarten Slough would be justified, and in this Samuel Elmore, present of Pacific Navigation Co., concurred.

During the summer of 1913, Elmore was the only steamer providing service to Tillamook City. By this time the railroad had reached Tillamook and most of the merchants of the city were using rail transport. Elmore was used principally by farmers to ship cheese. The local newspaper urged merchants to make increased use of Elmore, as the lack of business might force the steamer off the route. This would make it more difficult to obtain federally funded harbor improvements in the area.

== Interruptions in service ==
In late March, 1913, Elmore was returned to service after having been laid up during the winter, and was expected to leave Portland bound for Tillamook on the evening of Thursday, March 27, 1913.

The Elmore was removed from the Portland-Tillamook route because of storms during the winter of 1915–16 and laid up at Astoria. In March 1916, it was hoped that weather conditions in April might allow to the boat to return to service on the route. When Elmore was returned to service in 1916, its schedule was changed so that it now departed Portland every Wednesday night for Tillamook.

In December 1916, Elmore was undergoing repairs at Portland. It was not certain at the time whether the Elmore would be returned to service. Typically during the winter Elmore was taken out of service because of poor weather conditions on the ocean.

== Competition from railroad ==
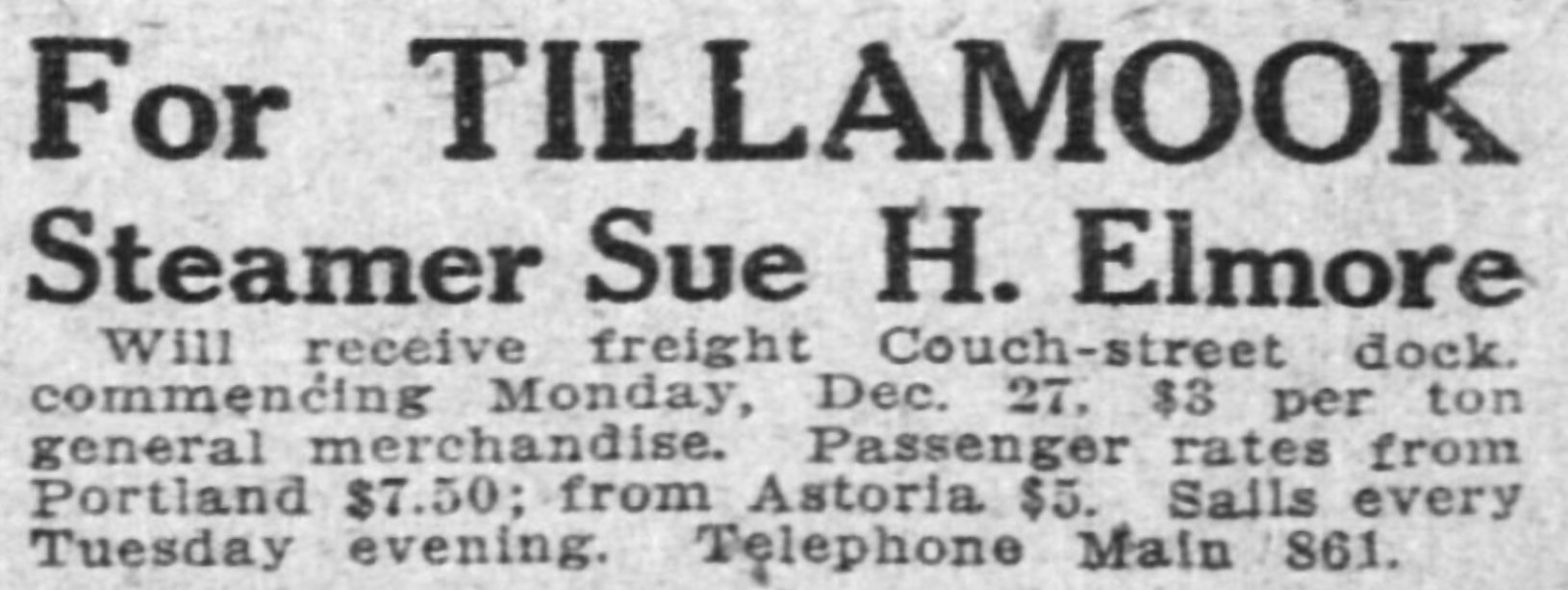
Advertisement for Sue H. Elmore, 1909.

No rail connection existed to Tillamook in 1906. However, a line was then in the process of being built from Hillsboro, Oregon, by the Pacific Railway and Navigation Company along the Nehalem River. By the end of 1906, track had been laid from Hillsboro to Buxton, 16 miles to the west, and a further seven miles had been graded. Financial problems had delayed completion of the railroad. However, in 1907 the railroad was expected to be completed to Tillamook within a few years, and it was projected that once that occurred, much of the water-borne freight would then be carried overland.

Freight shipping by sea from Tillamook City reached its highest point in 1911, when approximately 26,000 tons were shipped. Once the railroad was completed, marine shipping of freight rapidly fell off, and by 1918, it had practically ceased. This was in spite of federally funded projects to improve the navigation facilities in Tillamook Bay.

Elmore was no longer calling at Tillamook City by 1918. According to a report submitted to Congress from the Army Corps of Engineers, "it would appear that there is not sufficient business at this harbor to warrant the use of large vessels and apparently those of small capacity cannot successfully compete with the railroad, which offers shorter and more direct market connections."

== Later years ==
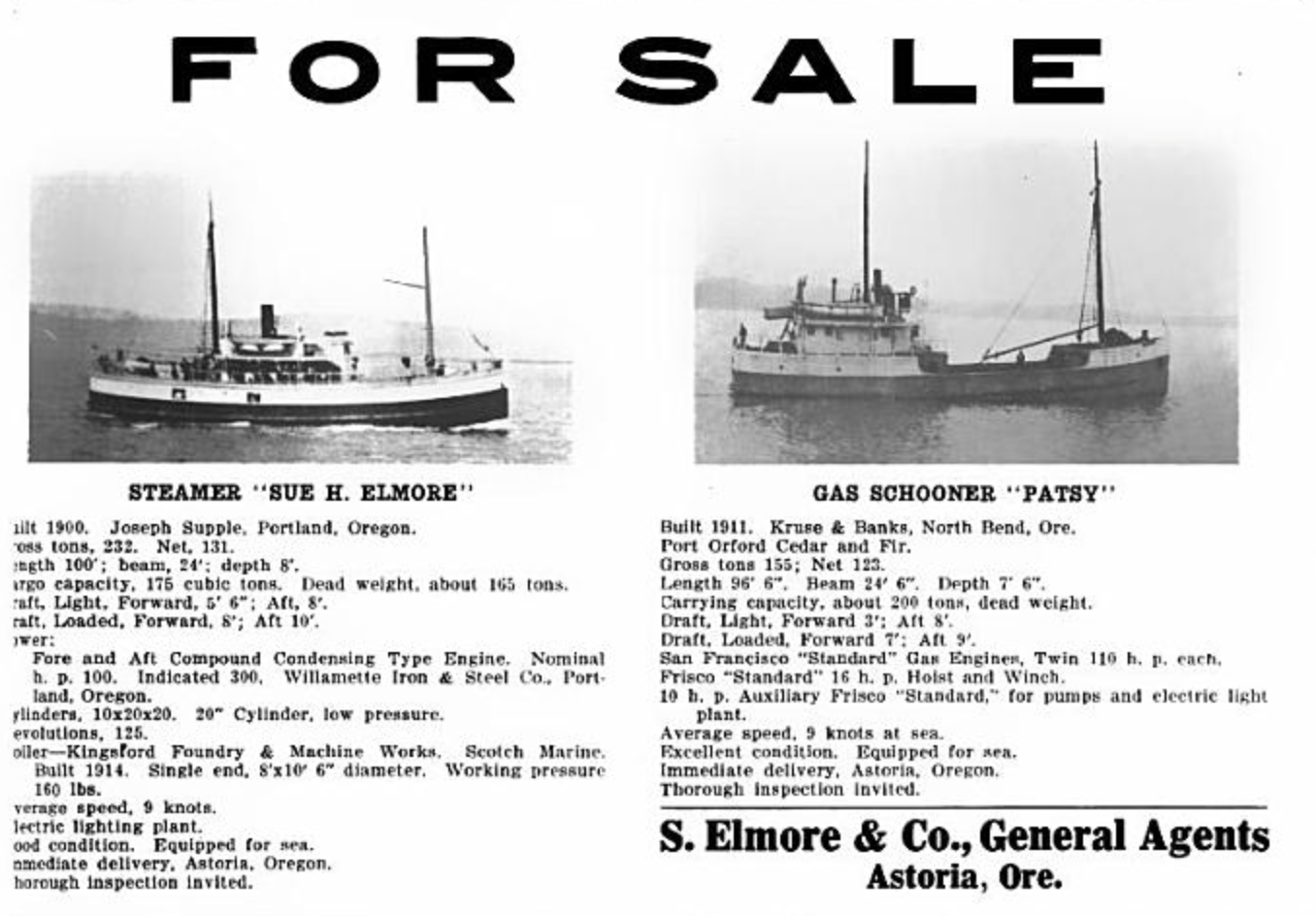
Advertisement for sale of steamer Sue H. Elmore and gasoline schooner Patsy, August, 1917.

In August 1917, Sue H. Elmore and another Elmore vessel, the gasoline schooner Patsy, were listed for sale. In 1919, Sue H. Elmore was shown as being owned by S.H. Elmore & Co., with its office in Astoria. Later, Elmore was transferred to Puget Sound and placed in freight service under the name Bergen. In 1920, the ship was owned by the Northwest Coast Investment Co., of Seattle, Washington.

In 1922, Bergen was shown to be owned by Herbert F. Simpson, with a home port (the place where the vessel's official documentation was kept), of Los Angeles. The vessel was still registered as an ocean-going passenger ship. Bergen was refitted with a gasoline engine.

The ship was later transferred to San Diego where it served as a tug for the Star & Crescent Boat Co. under the name Cuyamaca. This had occurred by 1930, when Cuyamuca's owner was shown as the Star & Crescent Boat Co., with an office at the foot of Broadway in San Diego. In 1930, Cuyamaca was registered as a fishing or towing vessel, homeported in San Diego, with a crew of 11, not including the master. The engine horsepower was listed as 200. The vessel was converted from a gasoline to a diesel engine. The vessel was reconstructed, with gross tonnage reduced to 176 tons, with net tonnage shown as 139.

By 1935 Cuyamaca's flag recognition letters had been changed, to WLEQ.

During the Second World War, Cuyamaca was acquired by the U.S. Army and renamed ST-361. "ST" stood for "small tug".

In January 1948, Cuyamaca was sunk in harbor near La Guaira, Venezuela. Cuyamaca was raised however, and by 1950 it was registered in Pensacola, Florida to C. W. Smith, of 1325 N. "A" Street, with engine horsepower now shown as 700. Smith also owned the scow Shelby, By 1953, Cuyamaca was no longer listed in the official merchant registry.

== Park in Tillamook ==
The landing place on Hoquarten Slough formerly used by Sue B. Elmore and other steamers has been designated as the Sue H. Elmore municipal park by the City of Tillamook, Oregon. The 1.03 acre park is located at the northwest corner of the intersection of Front Street and Main Avenue (Highway 101) in the city of Tillamook. It is part of the National Recreation Water Trails system.

== See also ==
- Samuel Elmore Cannery
