= Woods, Oregon =

Unincorporated community in the state of Oregon, United States

Woods
- Unincorporated community
- Location within the state of Oregon Woods (the United States)
- Coordinates: 45°12′51″N 123°57′13″W
- Country: United States
- State: Oregon
- County: Tillamook
- Elevation: 23 ft (7.0 m)
- Time zone: UTC-8 (Pacific (PST))
  - Summer (DST): UTC-7 (PDT)
- GNIS feature ID: 1152639
- Coordinates and elevation from Geographic Names Information System

Woods is an unincorporated community in Tillamook County, Oregon, United States. Woods lies at the intersection of Brooten Road, Resort Drive, and Old Woods Road, along the Nestucca River just north of Pacific City and west of U.S. Route 101.

Named for Joseph Woods, who settled here in about 1875, the community had a post office from 1886 through 1935. William Booth, who suggested the name "Woods", was the first postmaster.
