= Oretown, Oregon =

Unincorporated community in the state of Oregon, United States

Oretown
- Unincorporated community
- Location within the state of Oregon Oretown (the United States)
- Coordinates: 45°09′13″N 123°57′19″W
- Country: United States
- State: Oregon
- County: Tillamook
- Elevation: 39 ft (12 m)
- Time zone: UTC-8 (Pacific (PST))
  - Summer (DST): UTC-7 (PDT)
- GNIS feature ID: 1147268
- Coordinates and elevation from Geographic Names Information System

Oretown is an unincorporated community in Tillamook County, Oregon, United States. It is along U.S. Route 101 about 4 miles (6 km) north of Neskowin and south of Nestucca Bay.

In 1877, settlers James B. Upton and S. H. Rock petitioned Senator John H. Mitchell asking for a mail route to Grand Ronde and a post office. Upton owned a seal marked "Oregon City", so he suggested the new post office be named "Ore City" and he would alter the seal so it could be used for the new community. Mitchell knew confusion with Oregon City would occur, and suggested the name "Oretown" to the postal authorities instead. The name was accepted and Oretown post office ran from 1877 to 1954. Today Oretown has a Cloverdale mailing address.

At one time Oretown had a cheese factory and a salmon cannery. Today the community has a historic church, the 1913 Oretown Bible Church, a Grange hall built in 1907, and a few houses.
