= McGuire Reservoir =

Reservoir in Yamhill County, Oregon, United States

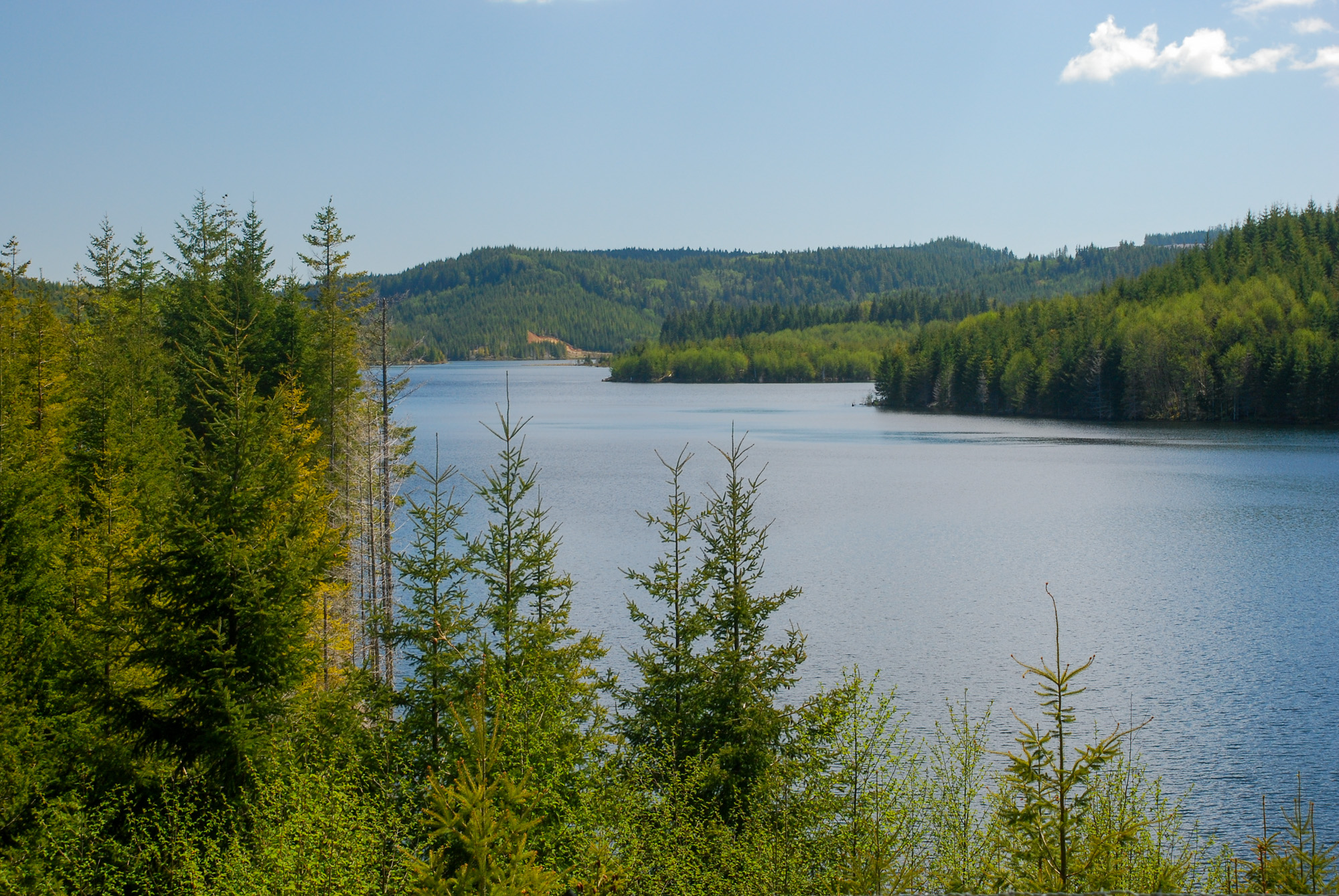
- McGuire Reservoir, Meadow Lake Road, Coast Range

- Location of McGuire Reservoir in Oregon McGuire Reservoir (the United States)
- Location: Yamhill County, Oregon, United States
- Coordinates: 45°18′00″N 123°24′02″W
- Basin countries: United States
- Surface area: 136.4 acres (55.2 ha)
- Water volume: 9,800 acre-feet (12,100,000 m^{3})
- Shore length^{1}: 4.8 miles (7.7 km)
- Surface elevation: 1,893 feet (577 m)
- ^{1} Shore length is not a well-defined measure.

McGuire Reservoir is an impoundment of the upper Nestucca River in Yamhill County in the U.S. state of Oregon. It is the primary raw water source for McMinnville Water and Light, which supplies drinking water to the city of McMinnville.

Before a 21st-century project expanded the reservoir, it had a surface area of about 136 acres (55 ha) and a shoreline of about 4.8 miles (7.7 km). The expansion increased the holding capacity of the reservoir from 3,760 acre-feet (4,640,000 m^{3}) to 9,800 acre-feet (12,100,000 m^{3}).

== See also ==
- List of lakes in Oregon
