= Duckbill (rock formation) =

Rock formation in the U.S. state of Oregon

- Sandstone hoodoo
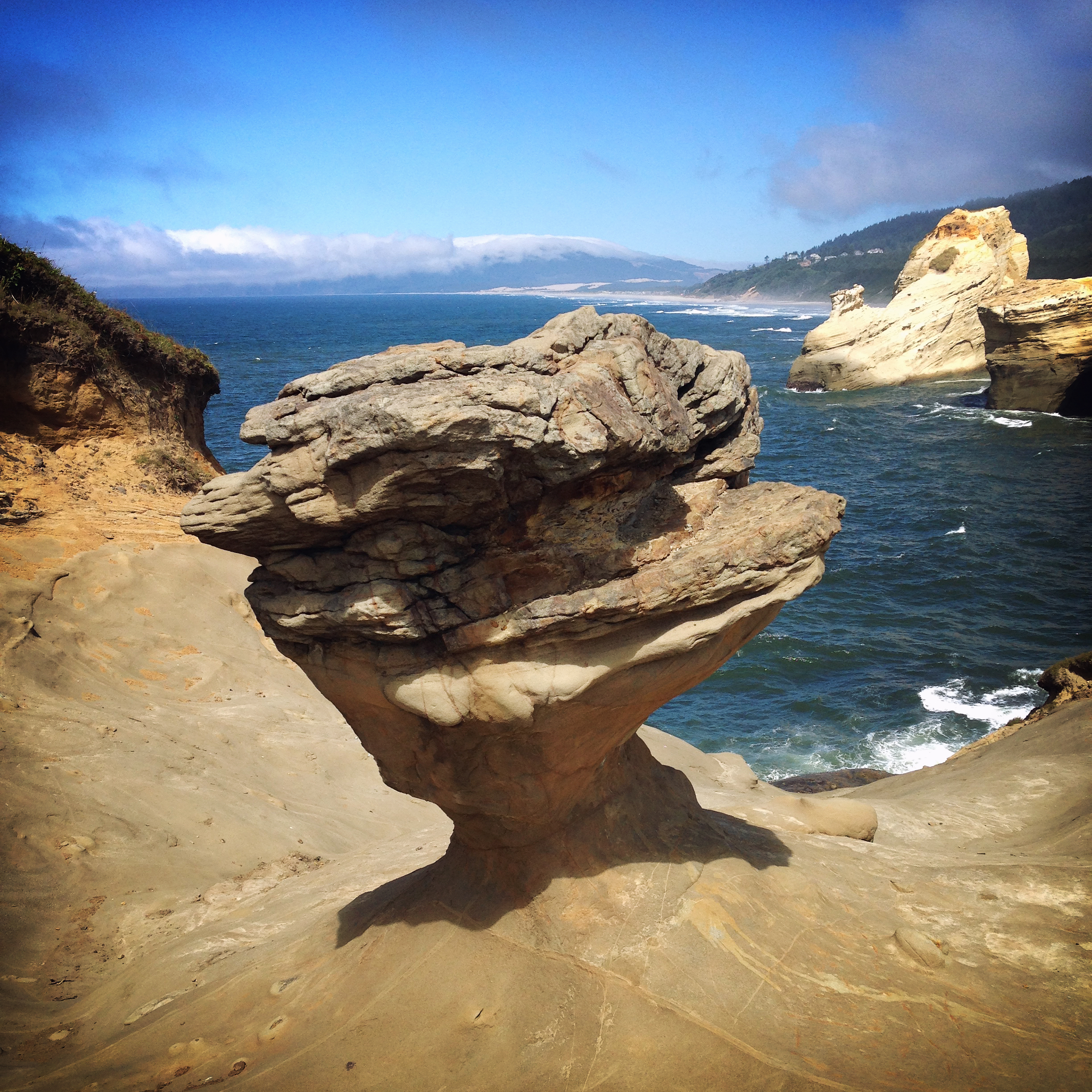
- The rock formation on August 27, 2014

- Location within Oregon
- Coordinates: 45°13′04″N 123°58′46″W
- Location: Tillamook County, Oregon
- Elevation: 12 m (39 ft)

Duckbill was a sandstone hoodoo rock formation at Cape Kiwanda State Natural Area, in the U.S. state of Oregon. The formation was a frequently-photographed tourist attraction on the Oregon Coast. It was destroyed by a group of teenage vandals who toppled the stone on August 29, 2016.

The vandals said they destroyed the formation as "a public service" which eliminated what they called "a safety hazard" because a friend of theirs had broken a leg on the rock formation. However, Chris Havel, Oregon Parks and Recreation Department associate director, noted that the formation was fenced-off and signs warned visitors against approaching it: "The fence is very clear; you have to intentionally move the wires aside and crawl through it." None of the vandals have ever been caught.
