= Bob Straub State Park =

State park in Oregon, US

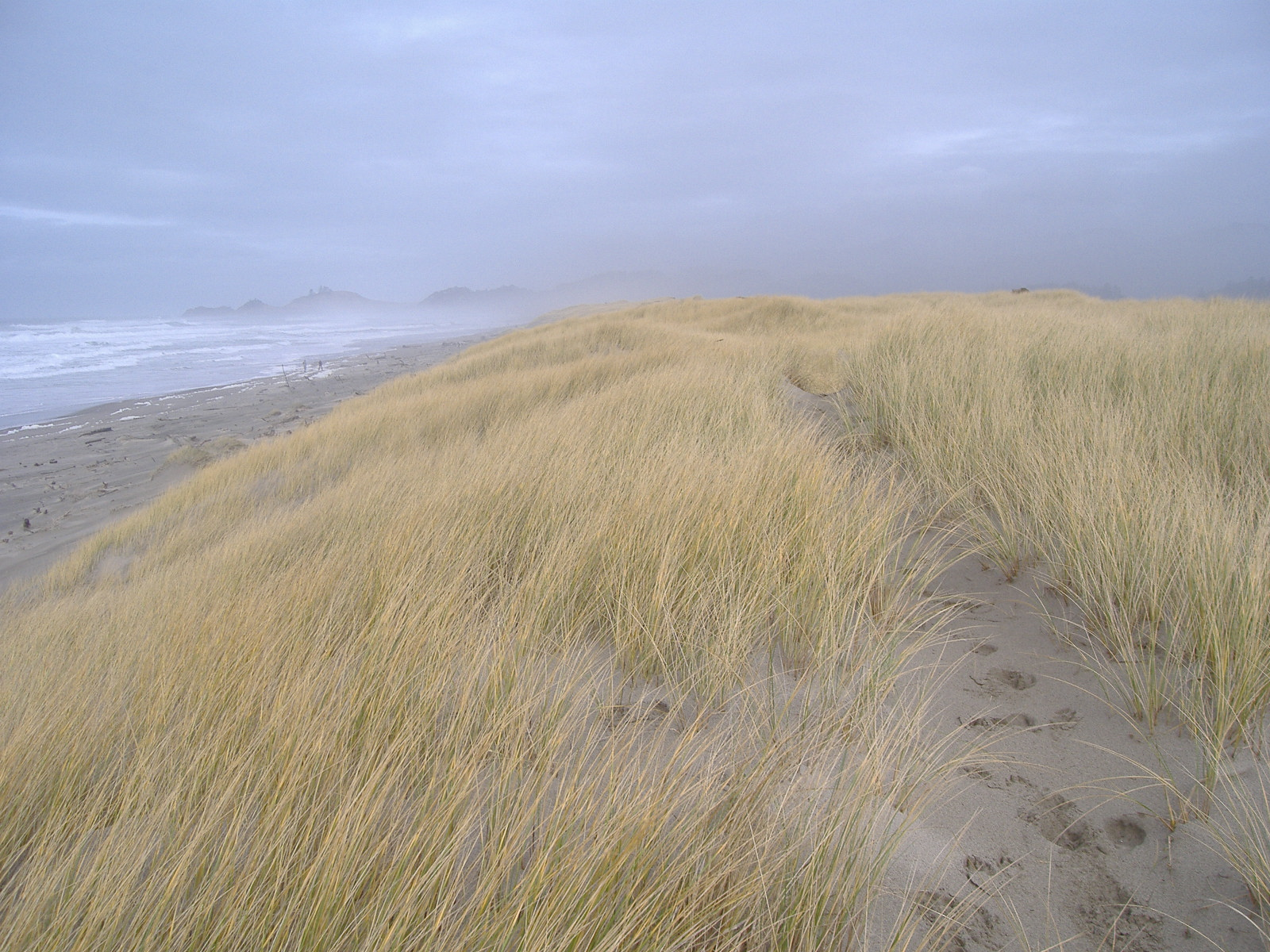
- Sea grass guides a trail along the Nestucca Sand Spit

- Location within Oregon Location within the United States
- Location: Tillamook County, Oregon, USA
- Nearest city: Pacific City, OR
- Coordinates: 45°10′59″N 123°57′54″W
- Area: 484 acres (196 ha)
- Operator: Oregon Parks and Recreation Department

Bob Straub State Park is a 484-acre (196 ha) state park in Pacific City, Tillamook County, Oregon, United States. It is named for former Oregon Governor Robert W. Straub. The park encompasses the Nestucca Sand Spit and is bordered by the Pacific Ocean to the west and Nestucca River to the east.
