= Pacific City, Oregon =

Unincorporated community in the state of Oregon, United States

- Census-designated place (CDP) & unincorporated community
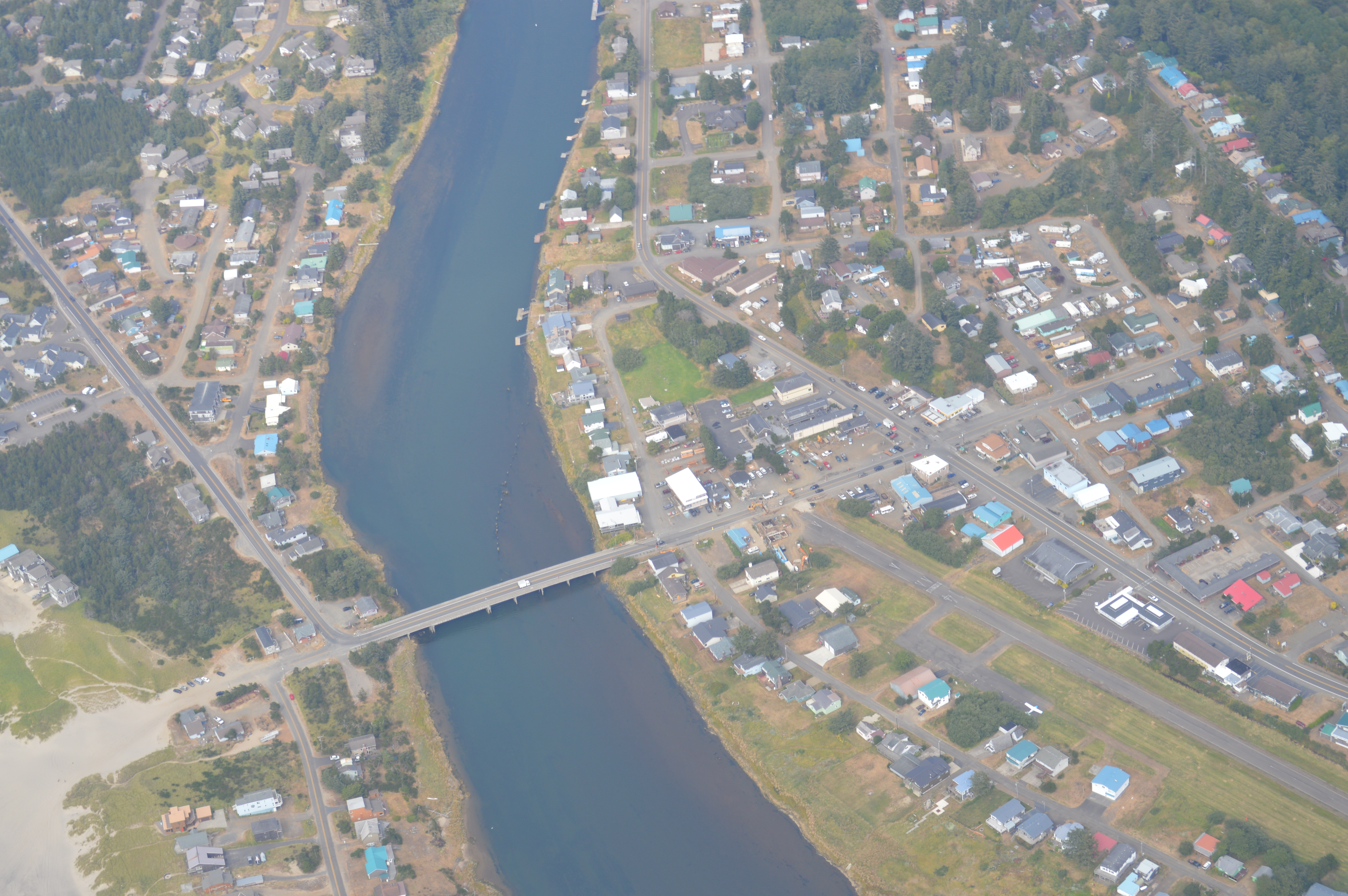
- Aerial view of Pacific City

- Location of Pacific City, Oregon
- Coordinates: 45°12′21″N 123°57′14″W
- Country: United States
- State: Oregon
- County: Tillamook

Area
  - Total: 3.83 sq mi (9.91 km^{2})
  - Land: 3.72 sq mi (9.63 km^{2})
  - Water: 0.11 sq mi (0.28 km^{2})
- Elevation: 7 ft (2.1 m)

Population (2020)
  - Total: 1,109
  - Density: 298.2/sq mi (115.15/km^{2})
- Time zone: UTC-8 (Pacific (PST))
  - Summer (DST): UTC-7 (PDT)
- ZIP Code: 97135
- Area code: 503
- FIPS code: 41-56150
- GNIS feature ID: 2409013

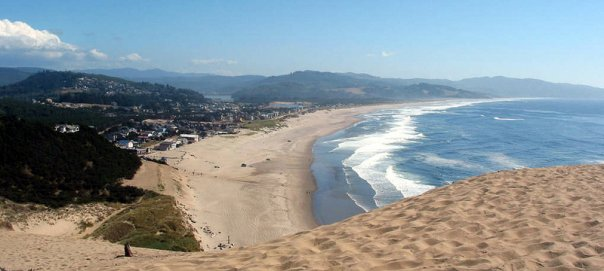
Pacific City and Nestucca Bay from the top of the Cape Kiwanda sand dune

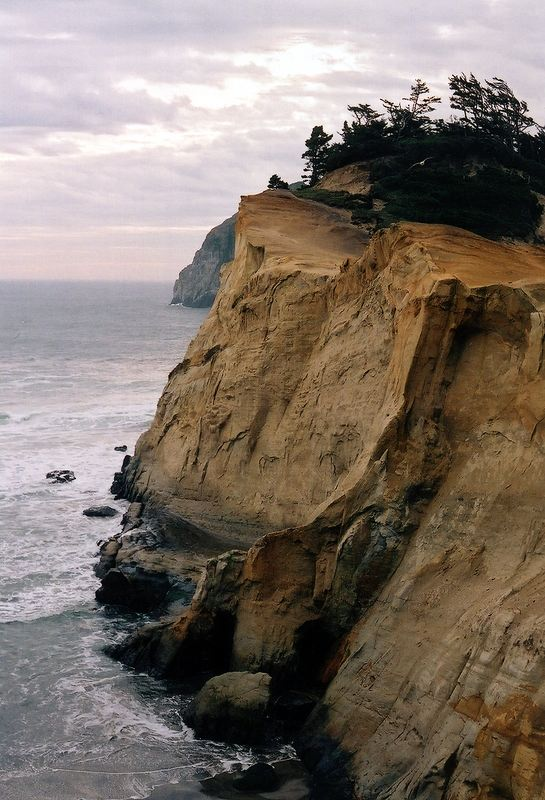
The view from the trail on Cape Kiwanda

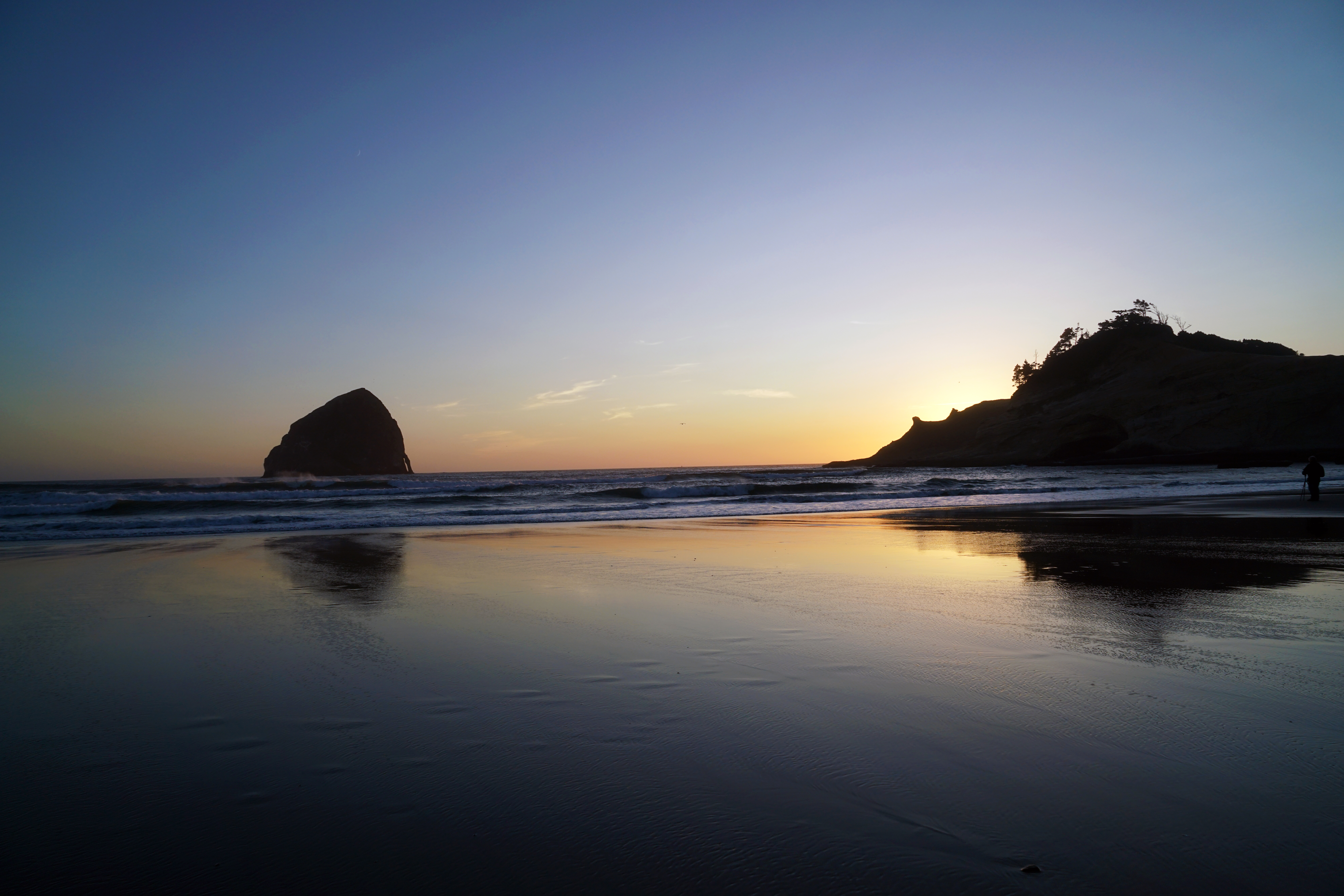
Sunset in Pacific City, Oregon

Pacific City is a census-designated place (CDP) and unincorporated community in Tillamook County, Oregon, United States. The population was 1,109 at the 2020 census. Pacific City is home to the Cape Kiwanda State Natural Area.

== History ==
In 1845, Mr. Johnson, a cook on an English ship sailing along the Columbia River, deserted and traveled down the Willamette Valley. Establishing a land claim in Champoeg, he began removing brush and that summer set off a burn to clear debris. The Champoeg Fire got out of control and spread eastward. Unfortunately, the wind then reversed direction and strengthened, blowing the blaze around the previous burn and fanning it into the dry Coast Range, where it burned in the Yamhill basin for weeks, consuming 1,500,000 acres (6,100 km^{2}) of old growth forest – the largest such area destroyed in a single forest fire in the United States. Settlers did not live west of the Coast Range, but the small tribes of Native Americans in the area, already depleted by 80% due to malaria and other epidemics from 1830 to 1841, were driven from their lands.

The Nestuggas were one such tribe, that had previously been encamped just north of Pacific City near the town of Woods. They had noticed the smoke for several weeks, but were surprised one morning as the bright flames flickered atop the crests of the surrounding hills and rushed down on them. The Nestuggas fled by canoe down the Big Nestucca River to the ocean, and took refuge on the half-mile wide bare sandspit between Nestucca Bay and the ocean. After several weeks the fires were ended by a heavy rain, but the devastation had been complete: the forests were gone, and the game found to be charred crisp or cooked in the water they had sought refuge in.

Nestucca Bay was a rich fishing area, allowing the Nestuggas to survive despite the destruction of game. However, in 1854, settlers began arriving in the Tillamook Valley, and by 1876 Chief Nestugga Bill and the 200 remaining people of the small tribe were relocated to a reservation on the Salmon and Siletz River.

Many early pioneers arrived via seagoing steamers, others arrived from across the mountains. The town of Woods established itself as a depot for the new arrivals and a source of supplies and trade for the settlers. In 1886 the Linewebber and Brown cannery was started to take advantage of the plentiful fish in Nestucca Bay, shipping 12,000 cans of salmon a year and providing an economic basis for the region until 1926, along with logging and dairy farming. The area also became a "vacation" destination for Oregon Trail pioneers from the Midwest, who had never seen the ocean.

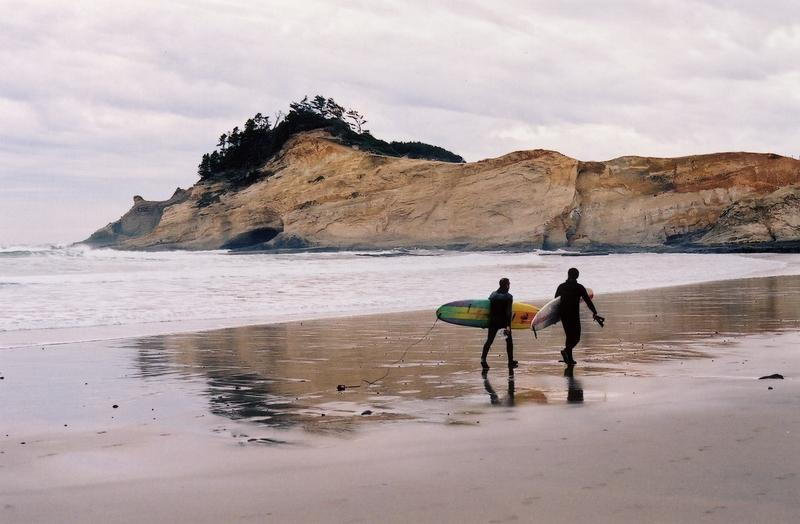
Surfers in Pacific City with Cape Kiwanda in the background, November 2004

In 1893, Thomas Malaney platted the town of Ocean Park (now Pacific City) directly across the river from Woods. When a flood in 1894 wiped out the first lots, Malaney moved the town south to higher ground. The Sea View hotel (later renamed Edmundes Hotel) was built around 1895 to serve vacationers from the Willamette Valley. Other buildings and campgrounds were established for visitors, and Ferry Street was "paved" with wooden planks for automobiles.

The town gained its modern name of Pacific City in 1909 to avoid confusion with the Washington town of Ocean Park. By 1926, overfishing from gillnetting had left the bay depleted of salmon, so commercial harvesting was stopped and fishermen switched to surf-launched dories; over time, due to commercial fishing vessels, the Dory Fleet dwindled and today only a few recreational fishermen keep the tradition alive. In the 1920s, tourism became the mainstay of the economy, lasting until the Great Depression of the 1930s. An airport was built to attract barnstormers and aviators, and other roads and bridges were opened.

== Geography and climate ==
Pacific City is located along the Pacific Ocean adjacent to Bob Straub State Park and spans the Nestucca River with about half the city's area being behind Nestucca Bay. It is part of the Oregon Coast.

According to the United States Census Bureau, the CDP has a total area of 3.8 square miles (9.8 km^{2}), of which 3.7 square miles (9.6 km^{2}) of it is land and 0.1 square miles (0.26 km^{2}) of it (2.86%) is water. The area is located 13 feet (4.0 m) above sea-level.

Climate data for Pacific City, Oregon
Month	Jan	Feb	Mar	Apr	May	Jun	Jul	Aug	Sep	Oct	Nov	Dec	Year
Record high °F (°C)	75 (24)	79 (26)	80 (27)	89 (32)	99 (37)	99 (37)	102 (39)	106 (41)	98 (37)	94 (34)	80 (27)	71 (22)	106 (41)
Mean daily maximum °F (°C)	49.8 (9.9)	52.2 (11.2)	54.7 (12.6)	57.6 (14.2)	62.0 (16.7)	65.4 (18.6)	69.7 (20.9)	70.6 (21.4)	69.3 (20.7)	62.0 (16.7)	53.3 (11.8)	48.6 (9.2)	59.6 (15.3)
Mean daily minimum °F (°C)	38.9 (3.8)	38.7 (3.7)	39.6 (4.2)	41.3 (5.2)	44.9 (7.2)	48.7 (9.3)	50.8 (10.4)	51.2 (10.7)	48.7 (9.3)	44.9 (7.2)	41.3 (5.2)	38.0 (3.3)	43.9 (6.6)
Record low °F (°C)	8 (−13)	11 (−12)	25 (−4)	28 (−2)	30 (−1)	33 (1)	36 (2)	36 (2)	33 (1)	19 (−7)	17 (−8)	9 (−13)	8 (−13)
Average precipitation inches (mm)	11.28 (287)	8.90 (226)	8.51 (216)	5.60 (142)	4.30 (109)	3.03 (77)	1.40 (36)	1.38 (35)	3.33 (85)	5.89 (150)	11.87 (301)	11.83 (300)	77.32 (1,964)
Average snowfall inches (cm)	0.4 (1.0)	0.3 (0.76)	0.2 (0.51)	0.1 (0.25)	0 (0)	0 (0)	0 (0)	0 (0)	0 (0)	0 (0)	0.1 (0.25)	0.3 (0.76)	1.4 (3.6)
Source 1: Rainfall averages — PlantMaps
Source 2: Temperature averages — BestPlaces.net

== Demographics ==
Historical population
Census	Pop.	Note	%±
2020	1,109		—
U.S. Decennial Census

As of the census of 2000, there were 1,027 people, 485 households, and 317 families residing in the CDP. The population density was 274.7 inhabitants per square mile (106.1/km^{2}). There were 1,090 housing units at an average density of 291.6 per square mile (112.6/km^{2}). The racial makeup of the CDP was 94.16% Caucasian, 1.75% Native American, 0.58% Asian, 2.04% from other races, and 1.46% from two or more races. Hispanic or Latino of any race were 3.02% of the population.

There were 485 households, out of which 13.4% had children under the age of 18 living with them, 54.8% were married couples living together, 6.6% had a female householder with no husband present, and 34.6% were non-families. 30.1% of all households were made up of individuals, and 14.8% had someone living alone who was 65 years of age or older. The average household size was 2.12 and the average family size was 2.55.

In the CDP, the population was spread out, with 16.1% under the age of 18, 4.0% from 18 to 24, 17.6% from 25 to 44, 35.0% from 45 to 64, and 27.4% who were 65 years of age or older. The median age was 53 years. For every 100 females, there were 96.7 males. For every 100 females age 18 and over, there were 94.1 males.

The median income for a household in the CDP was $33,250, and the median income for a family was $55,368. Males had a median income of $26,042 versus $26,250 for females. The per capita income for the CDP was $25,819. About 8.4% of families and 7.9% of the population were below the poverty line, including 23.8% of those under age 18 and none of those age 65 or over.

== Infrastructure ==
The shore station for the National Science Foundation's Ocean Observatories Initiative Regional Scale Nodes underwater cabled observatory is located in Pacific City.

=== Telecommunications undersea cables ===
Four undersea telecommunications cables come ashore in Pacific City:

- Hawaiki Cable, which connects Pacific City and Los Angeles with Polynesian ashore sites in Kapolei, Tafuna, Mangawhai Heads, and Sydney.
- New Cross Pacific (NCP) Cable System, which connects Pacific City with East Asia ashore sites in Toucheng, Pusan, Nanhui, Maruyama, Lingang, and Chongming.

=== Transportation ===
Pacific City is located 2.8 miles (4.5 km) from U.S. Route 101 and is served by the 1,875-foot-long (572 m) Pacific City State Airport, owned and maintained by Oregon Department of Aviation.

Tillamook County Transportation District, with two bus stops in Pacific City, offers bus service to Tillamook.

== Education ==
It is in the Nestucca Valley School District 101J

The county is in the Tillamook Bay Community College district.
