= Tillamook language =

Extinct Salishan language of northwestern Oregon, US

Tillamook
- Hutyáyu, Hutyéyu
- Native to: United States
- Region: Northwestern Oregon
- Ethnicity: Tillamook, Siletz
- Extinct: 1972, with the death of Minnie Scovell
- Language family: Salishan: Coast Salish; Tillamook
- Dialects: Tillamook; Siletz

Language codes
- ISO 639-3: til
- Glottolog: till1254
- Tillamook is classified as Extinct by the UNESCO Atlas of the World's Languages in Danger.

Tillamook is an extinct Salishan language, formerly spoken by the Tillamook people in northwestern Oregon, United States. The last fluent speaker was Minnie Scovell who died in 1972. In an effort to prevent the language from being lost, a group of researchers from the University of Hawai'i interviewed the few remaining Tillamook speakers and created a 120-page dictionary.

== Phonology ==
=== Vowels ===
Vowels in Tillamook
	Front	Central	Back
High	i		əɰ
Mid		ə	
Low	æ		ɑ

The vowel sounds transcribed with the letters ⟨u u˙ o o˙⟩ are analysed as diphthongs with increasing § internal rounding, being realizations of the phoneme /əw/ ([əɰ]).

=== Consonants ===
Consonants in Tillamook
		Dental/ Alveolar			Palatal (-alveolar)	Velar		Uvular		Glottal
		plain	sibilant	lateral	Palatal (-alveolar)	unrounded	rounded	unrounded	rounded	Glottal
Plosive/ Affricate	plain	d	t͡s		t͡ʃ	ɡ	ɡᶤ	(ɢ)	(ɢᵓ)	ʔ
Plosive/ Affricate	aspirated	tʰ	t͡s		t͡ʃ	kʰ	kʰᶤ	qʰ	qʰᵓ	
Plosive/ Affricate	ejective	tʼ	t͡sʼ	t͡ɬʼ	t͡ʃʼ	kʼ	kʼᶤ	qʼ	qʼᵓ	
Fricative			s	ɬ	ʃ	x	xᶤ	χ	χᵓ	h
Sonorant	plain	n		l	j		ɰᶤ			
Sonorant	glottalic	nˀ		lˀ	jˀ		ɰˀᶤ			

==== Internal rounding ====
Tillamook has several phonemic "rounded" velar and uvular consonants, traditionally transcribed with the diacritic ⟨ʷ⟩. However, this is somewhat misleading to the true phonetic articulation of these consonants as, according to Thompson & Thompson, Tillamook lacks labial elements entirely. Instead, the acoustic quality perceived as labialization is described as an internal rounding created by a "cupping" of the tongue.

This results in uvulars (postvelars) having a [ɔ]-like resonance, while (front) velars exhibit [ɨ]-like coloring. The chart above uses the ad hoc diacritics ⟨ᵓ⟩ and ⟨ᶤ⟩ to reflect this description and avoid the implication of true labialization. Similarly, the phoneme /w/ is formed with this internal rounding, making it akin to [ɰ].

== Bibliography ==
- Edel, May M (1939). The Tillamook language. New York: J.J. Augustin. LCCN 40001628. OCLC 10272025.
- "May M. Edel papers". Archives West. April 13, 2018 [2007].
- Thompson, Laurence C.; Thompson, M. Terry (1966). "A Fresh Look at Tillamook Phonology". International Journal of American Linguistics. 32 (4): 313–319. doi:10.1086/464920. JSTOR 1264085. S2CID 145658086.
