= Little Nestucca River =

River in northwest Oregon

- Location of the mouth of the Little Nestucca River in Oregon
- Etymology: Indian word for a part of the Nestucca River or a point on its banks

Location
- Country: United States
- State: Oregon
- County: Polk and Tillamook

Physical characteristics
- Source: Central Oregon Coast Range
  - location: near H. B. Van Duzer Forest State Scenic Corridor, Polk County, Oregon
  - coordinates: 45°02′19″N 123°43′05″W
  - elevation: 839 ft (256 m)
- Mouth: Nestucca Bay
  - location: near Pacific City, Tillamook County, Oregon
  - coordinates: 45°10′05″N 123°56′40″W
  - elevation: 0 ft (0 m)
- Length: 20 mi (32 km)

The Little Nestucca River is a river, approximately 20 miles (32 km) long, on the Pacific coast of northwest Oregon in the United States. It drains an area of the Central Oregon Coast Range west of the Willamette Valley.

It rises in the Van Duzer State Forest in northwestern Polk County, in the mountains west of Salem. It flows generally northwest, through the Siuslaw National Forest and enters Nestucca Bay on the Pacific near Pacific City. The Little Nestucca River crosses under the U.S. Route 101 just three miles south of Pacific City and is paralleled for much of its length by County Road 130.

It enters Nestucca Bay at the south end, independently of the Nestucca River which enters from the north end. They flow approximately parallel, and at their nearest, are about two and a half miles apart.

== Fishing ==
The Little Nestucca River offers steelhead. A few stray hatchery steelhead are present throughout the winter season. Wild fish may be caught and released through the winter, with the run peaking in March. Limited public access is available along Little Nestucca River Road between Highway 22 and Highway 101.

The Little Nestucca River joins the Nestucca River from the south just before it flows into the Pacific Ocean. Only the headwaters are in public ownership—being managed by the Forest Service—with most of the primary fishing areas located on private lands. The river offers some boat fishing opportunities with a boat ramp located at the Highway 101 bridge. Most people fish for coho salmon and steelhead in the fall and winter. The river also features coastal cutthroat trout.

== Upton Falls ==
Upton Falls was historically the upstream limit of migration for native fish, but the falls have been altered to include a fish ladder and a small embankment dam to divert the water to the ladder. There is a swimming hole downstream of the falls. The waterfall was originally most likely similar to Stella Falls, located a mile upstream.

The falls apparently were named for James B. Upton, a nearby homesteader who owned and operated a farm in the area.

Upton Falls is adjacent to the Little Nestucca Highway, just over three miles inland from Highway 101. The falls are clear to westbound traffic. Parking is available for only a few cars. Scramble paths lead down from the road to the river, but they are steep and generally unstable.

Width: 5 feet (1.5 m) Height: 20 feet (6.1 m) 45.13578°N 123.89570°W

== Stella Falls ==
Stella Falls (also known as Estella Falls) is the upper of two small waterfalls along the lower stretch of the Little Nestucca River. The falls consist of a cascading chute which rumbles into a deep trough-like gorge, bypassed by a fish ladder. The falls remain in their original state. The area just downstream has a popular swimming hole and is popular for fishing as well.

Stella Falls occurs adjacent to the Little Nestucca Highway, just less than four miles inland from Highway 101. A large pool precedes the gorge. Ample parking is available along the road, and fishing access paths lead to the rocks adjacent to the river for views upstream and down.

Width: 10 feet (3.0 m) Height: 10 feet 45.12625°N 123.88719°W

== See also ==
- List of rivers of Oregon
