= Nestucca Bay =

Coordinates: 45°10′N 123°58′W

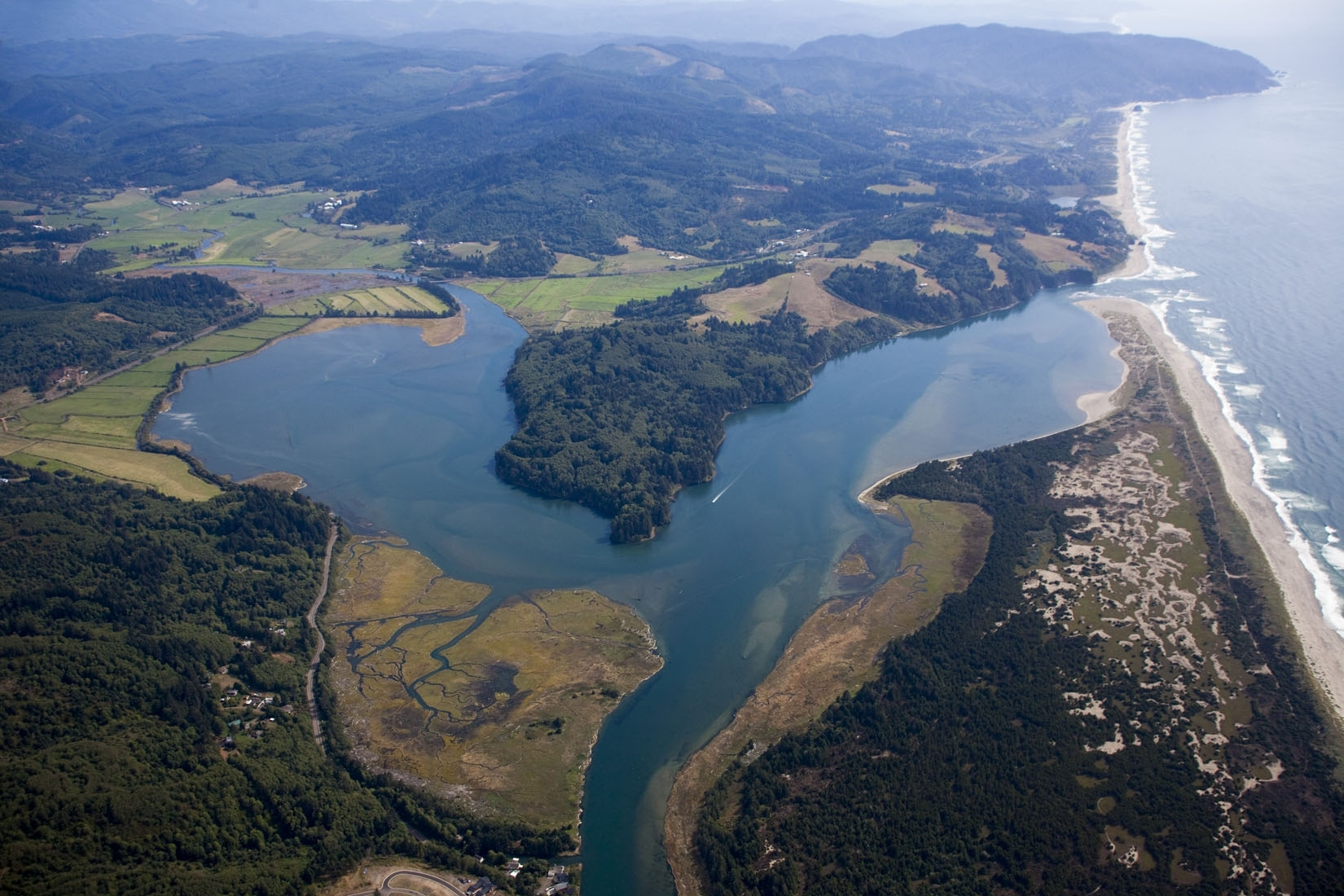
Nestucca Bay aerial view looking south

Nestucca Bay is a bay formed by the confluence of the Nestucca River and the Pacific Ocean in northwest Oregon in the United States. It is near the town of Pacific City, which is in southwestern Tillamook County, about 12 miles (19 km) south of Cape Lookout. The bay is a bar-built estuary and totals 1,000 acres (4.0 km^{2}) in area.

The Nestucca and Little Nestucca rivers enter the bay. The bay is separated from the Pacific Ocean by the Nestucca Spit which includes Bob Straub State Park. A part of Nestucca Bay is included in the Nestucca Bay National Wildlife Refuge.
