= Nestucca River =

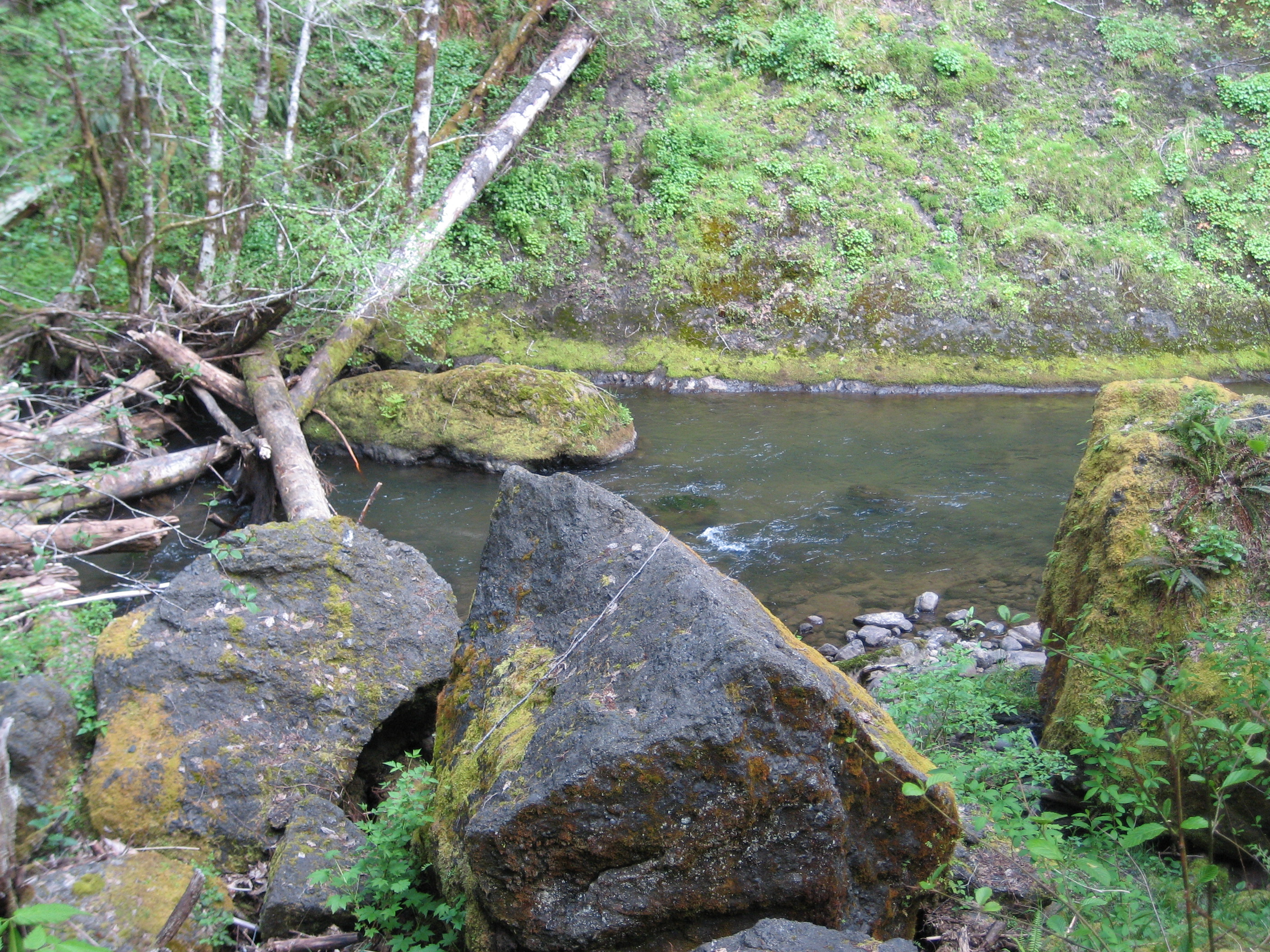
- Nestucca River in the Coast Range

- Location of the mouth of the Nestucca River in Oregon Nestucca River (the United States)
- Etymology: Indian word for a part of the river or a point on its banks or for a tribe living nearby

Location
- Country: United States
- State: Oregon
- County: Tillamook

Physical characteristics
- Source: Central Oregon Coast Range
  - location: near Ball Bearing Hill, Tillamook County, Oregon
  - coordinates: 45°16′23″N 123°23′33″W
  - elevation: 2,249 ft (685 m)
- Mouth: Nestucca Bay
  - location: near Pacific City, Tillamook County, Oregon
  - coordinates: 45°11′03″N 123°57′26″W
  - elevation: 0 ft (0 m)
- Length: 57 mi (92 km)
- Basin size: 255 sq mi (660 km^{2})
- Discharge
  - average: 1,050 cu ft/s (30 m^{3}/s)

National Wild and Scenic River
- Type: Recreational
- Designated: March 12, 2019

The Nestucca River flows for about 57 miles (92 km) through forests near the Pacific coast of northwest Oregon in the United States. It drains a timber-producing area of the Northern Oregon Coast Range west of Portland.

Rising in the mountains of western Yamhill County, it is impounded near its headwaters to create McGuire Reservoir, the primary water source for the city of McMinnville. The river flows generally west through Bureau of Land Management (BLM) land and the Siuslaw National Forest, past Beaver, then southwest past Hebo and Cloverdale. It enters Nestucca Bay, on the Pacific Ocean, from the north at Pacific City. The Little Nestucca River does not join the Nestucca but enters Nestucca Bay from the south.

== Recreation ==
Madelynne Sheehan in Fishing in Oregon calls the Nestucca River "a real gem of an all-around stream." Anglers can fish for spring chinook salmon, fall chinook, coho salmon, coastal cutthroat trout, and steelhead. Winter steelhead on this river average 10 to 14 pounds (4.5 to 6.4 kg), while summer steelhead of 4 to 7 pounds (1.8 to 3.2 kg) can sometimes appear "almost nose to tail throughout a 20-mile (32 km) section of the river".

Bank access to the lower river is limited because much of the land is privately owned, but the stream, which is 50 to 100 feet (15 to 30 m) wide on the lower reaches, is often fished from boats. Cloverdale, Farmer Creek, Three Rivers, and Pacific City have public boat ramps, and there are less formal put-in places upriver. Upstream of Moon Creek, more than half of the land along the river is publicly owned, is managed by the Siuslaw National Forest and the BLM, and includes five campgrounds. The upper river between Moon Creek and Elk Creek is fished mainly for winter steelhead, and no fishing is allowed upstream of Elk Creek.

An 8-mile (13 km) stretch of the upper river between Rocky Bend Campground and Blaine offers whitewater canoeing and kayaking possibilities when the flow is about 1,000 cubic feet per second (28 m^{3}/s). The first 2 miles (3 km) of the run include a class 4 rapid followed by a class 5 and another class 4. An alternate put-in is available at a log bridge downstream of the second class 4. Below the bridge, class 2 and 3 whitewater continues for the remaining 6 miles (10 km) of the run.

== See also ==
- List of rivers of Oregon
- List of longest streams of Oregon
