= Salmonberry (disambiguation) =

Salmonberry or salmonberries may refer to:

- Rubus spectabilis, plant species native to western Canada and the United States
- Salmonberries (film), a 1991 film by Percy Adlon
- Salmonberry River, a river in northwestern Oregon, United States
- Salmonberry Trail, a scenic trail along said river
