= Foss, Oregon =

Unincorporated community in the state of Oregon, United States

Foss
- Unincorporated community
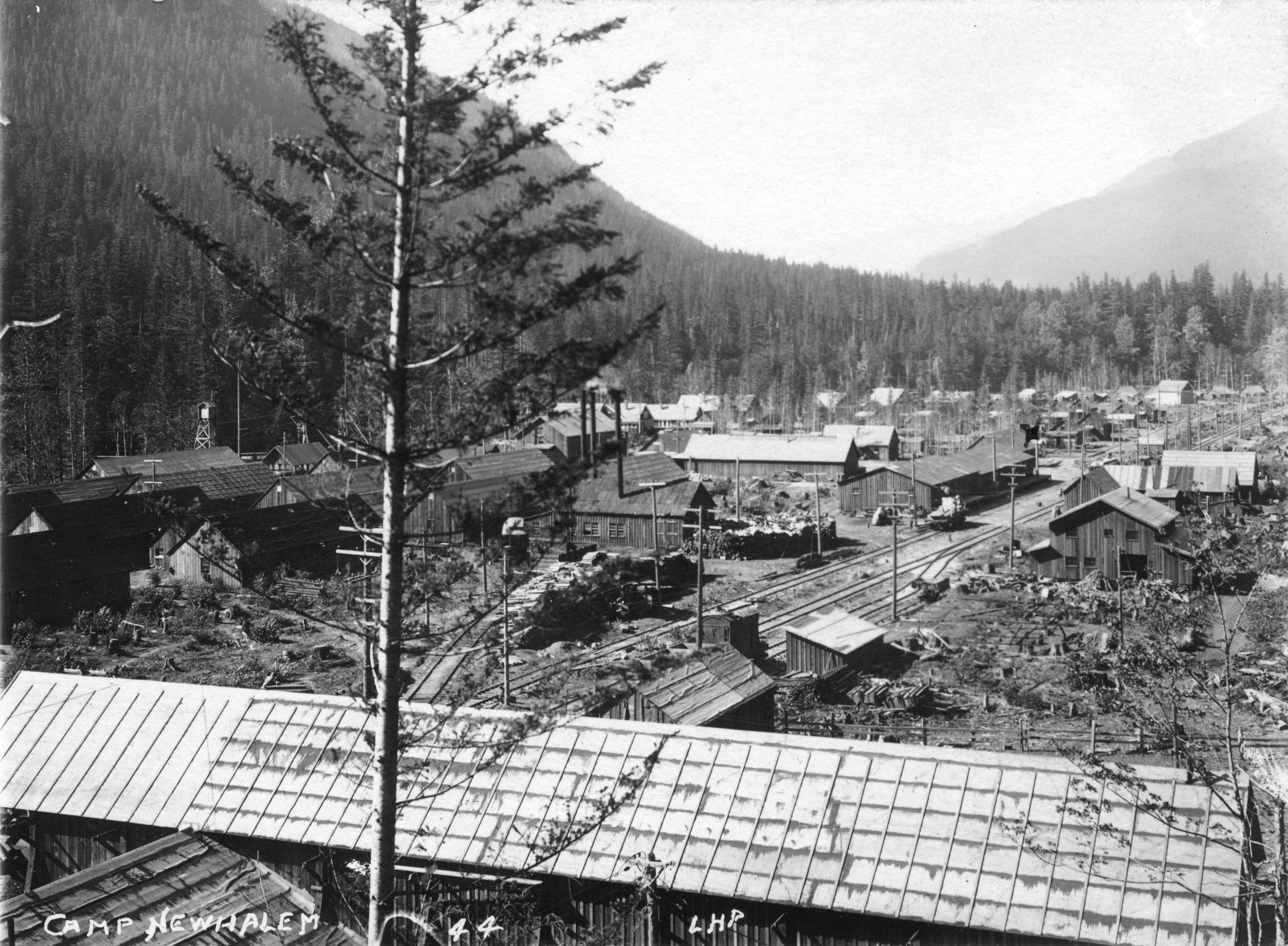
- Camp Nehalem

- Location within the state of Oregon Foss (the United States)
- Coordinates: 45°41′46″N 123°47′51″W
- Country: United States
- State: Oregon
- County: Tillamook
- Elevation: 49 ft (15 m)
- Time zone: UTC-8 (Pacific (PST))
  - Summer (DST): UTC-7 (PDT)
- Area codes: 503 and 971
- GNIS feature ID: 1120902

Foss is an unincorporated community in Tillamook County, Oregon, United States. It is about 4 miles (6 km) east of Mohler and Oregon Route 53, near the Nehalem River. Foss is the site of an important river flood gauge.

Foss was named for Herbert Foss, who owned timber in the area. Foss post office ran from 1928 to 1943, and Foss station on the Southern Pacific Railroad (now the Port of Tillamook Bay Railroad) was established shortly after the post office. Camp Nehalem (also known as Camp Foss), a Civilian Conservation Corps (CCC) camp northeast of Foss, had a Foss mailing address.

== Geography ==
Foss is only 474 acres in area. It lies in the Northwestern region of Oregon at a low elevation near the ocean surrounded by the highest mountains of the Oregon Coastal Range.

=== Climate ===
Foss has a borderline cool-summer Mediterranean and oceanic climate with cool, extremely rainy winters, with only 2 inches of snowfall annually, while the summers are mild with light precipitation. Because it lies at a low elevation surrounded by higher mountains near the ocean, heavy amounts of moisture get trapped in the region resulting in plentiful and heavy rainfall.

Climate data for Foss, Oregon (1981–2010)
Month	Jan	Feb	Mar	Apr	May	Jun	Jul	Aug	Sep	Oct	Nov	Dec	Year
Mean daily maximum °F (°C)	51.1 (10.6)	52.2 (11.2)	54.1 (12.3)	56.8 (13.8)	61.0 (16.1)	63.7 (17.6)	68.0 (20.0)	68.5 (20.3)	68.1 (20.1)	62.0 (16.7)	55.7 (13.2)	49.6 (9.8)	59.2 (15.1)
Mean daily minimum °F (°C)	38.8 (3.8)	39.2 (4.0)	39.5 (4.2)	41.4 (5.2)	44.7 (7.1)	50.2 (10.1)	51.7 (10.9)	51.0 (10.6)	48.6 (9.2)	45.5 (7.5)	42.3 (5.7)	38.6 (3.7)	44.3 (6.8)
Average precipitation inches (mm)	15.71 (399)	11.58 (294)	15.44 (392)	11.00 (279)	5.63 (143)	3.82 (97)	0.90 (23)	1.22 (31)	4.40 (112)	12.08 (307)	18.36 (466)	17.44 (443)	117.58 (2,986)
Average snowfall inches (cm)	0.8 (2.0)	0.7 (1.8)	0.1 (0.25)	0.0 (0.0)	0.0 (0.0)	0.0 (0.0)	0.0 (0.0)	0.0 (0.0)	0.0 (0.0)	0.0 (0.0)	0.0 (0.0)	0.8 (2.0)	2.4 (6.05)
Source: NOAA
