= Juneta =

Passenger ferry

- Juneta circa 1912 at a dock on the Nehalem River

History
- Name: Juneta
- Owner: William Rudolf Grosz
- Operator: William R. Grosz
- Port of registry: Astoria, OR; later, Portland, OR
- Builder: Wilson Bros.(Astoria, OR)
- In service: 1910
- Identification: historic: 207430; present: 55942
- Status: Operating as pleasure boat, 2014
- Notes: wooden construction

General characteristics
- Type: Passenger ferry; later: cannery tender; tugboat
- Tonnage: 10 gross tons; 6 net tons
- Length: 35.9 ft (10.94 m)
- Beam: 11.3 ft (3.44 m)
- Depth: 2.5 ft (0.76 m) depth of hold
- Installed power: gasoline engine, 20 horsepower, replaced later
- Propulsion: propeller
- Crew: One exclusive of master
- Notes: Value in 1929 said to have been $1,500.

Juneta was a passenger ferry that operated on the Nehalem River on the north coast of Oregon from 1910 to the mid-1920s. Thereafter this vessel was transferred to the Columbia River where it was operated out of Astoria as a cannery tender until the 1960s. Juneta was then converted to a tugboat, and operated commercially on the Columbia and Willamette rivers until 1976. Juneta is still in existence and afloat as a private yacht in the vicinity of Portland, Oregon.

== Construction and specifications ==
Juneta was built by Charles Wilson, at the Wilson Brothers shipyard at Astoria, Oregon Juneta was 35.9 ft (10.94 m) long, with a beam of 11.3 ft (3.44 m) and 2.5 ft (0.76 m) depth of hold. One crewman was required in addition to the master. Power was supplied by a gasoline engine generating 20 horsepower. The merchant registry number was 207430. The boat was licensed as a passenger vessel.

== Operations ==
=== Ferry on the Nehalem river ===
The Anderson brothers, William and Emil, operated Juneta on the Nahelem River from Wheeler to Nehalem. In addition to carrying passengers and mail on Juneta, the Anderson brothers ran a garage, so that when passengers arrived at Nehalem, one of the brothers would take them by motor vehicle from the dock to their destination in the Nehalem vicinity. William and Emil Anderson also operated the school buses.

At one point in its Nehalem River service, Juneta carried a sign saying "N.R.T. Co." above its pilot house name board., indicating that at some point the boat was operated or owned by the Nehalem River Transportation Company, builders, in 1900-1901, of one of the larger vessels to operate regularly on the Nehalem River, the steam tug George R. Vosburg. On another occasion, Juneta transported excessive passengers by lashing up a barge alongside and placing the excess persons on the barge. This was a common practice among the riverine vessels used on the Oregon coast, engaged in by for example the T.M. Richardson on Yaquina Bay.

In 1912, Juneta had trouble running on the Nehalem river because of the sand bars that had accumulated in the river between Wheeler and Todd’s Point. In April of the next year, 1913, the Nehalem Port Commission sent F.A. Rowe to Portland to attempt to get government assistance in dredging the sand bars. In early June 1913, however, the sand bar problem remained unaddressed.

Major McIndo, of Portland, who was in charge of the army engineering district with jurisdiction over the Nehalem river, had apparently stated that a dredge could not be secured until some time in July. The Tillamook Herald stated that this was a "rank injustice … we are solely dependent upon boat service to make train connections at Wheeler." The Herald further argued that "unless some definite action is taken soon it will be utterly impossible for the Juneta to make her run owing to the extreme low tides in June …"

In June 1916, Juniata was used to assist in floating the 90 foot long central span of the bridge across the north fork of the Nehalem River.

During the summer of 1920, visitors to Neahkanie and Manzanita, Oregon could reach these beaches from the Portland rail connection at Wheeler by a trip down the Nehalem on the Juneta, which made five trips a day on this route, under the command of Capt. William Anderson. After an overhaul in Astoria, Juneta was back in the same service in the summer of 1921. The launch was operated by Capt. Will Anderson to transport beach visitors in August 1923.

Tillamook County built a road from Wheeler to Nehalem, with bridge across the Nehalem river, which was scheduled to be complete in August, 1924. Once complete, the road and bridge would render the ferry service provided by Juneta unnecessary, as motor vehicles would make the journey between the two towns.

=== Cannery tender out of Astoria ===
Sometime in the fiscal year ending June 30, 1928, the Anderson brothers sold Juneta to the Barbey Packing Company, of Astoria.

In July 1929, Juneta was being used to transport Barbey Packing Co. employees to fishing grounds near the mouth of the Columbia River. The boat still had a 20 horsepower engine, which it continued to have until 1935 or later.

On July 15, 1929, while riding on Juneta, a Barbey employee, Oscar Lahteenkorva, was injured when his head struck a piling. He later sued the company for $25,000 for injuries sustain. The company filed a petition with the court to limit its liability to $1,500, which it said was the value of Juneta. The company also sought to dismiss the case on the grounds that it was covered by the workman’s compensation law.

Juneta continued to be registered in 1950 to Barbey Packing Corp, although by this time a new engine had been installed, rated at 140 horsepower. In 1963 Juneta was still owned by Barbey Packing Corp.

=== Tugboat in Portland, Oregon ===
By 1968, ownership of Juneta had passed to the Rocky Point Manufacturing Company, of Portland, Oregon. The vessel had been reregistered as a towboat. The engine continued to be shown as generating 140 horsepower.

On September 29, 1975, Juneta was hired by the Neptune Construction Company to move a newly remodeled houseboat 10 miles down the Willamette River from the Portland waterfront to Sauvie Island.

In 1976, Juneta, still under the original merchant vessel registry number of 207430, was removed from the official merchant vessels registry, with the reason stated as "out of documentation."

== Present status ==
As of 2014, Juneta is still in existence, in the vicinity of Portland, Oregon. Present power is supplied by a GMC 671 engine.
