= Mohler, Oregon =

Unincorporated community in the state of Oregon, United States

- Unincorporated community
- Location within Oregon Location within the United States
- Coordinates: 45°42′26″N 123°51′46″W
- Country: United States
- State: Oregon
- County: Tillamook

Area
  - Land: 0.012 sq mi (0.03 km^{2})
- Elevation: 16 ft (4.9 m)
- Time zone: UTC-8 (Pacific (PST))
  - Summer (DST): UTC-7 (PDT)
- ZIP code: 97131
- Area codes: 503 and 971
- GNIS feature ID: 1124281

Mohler is an unincorporated community in Tillamook County, Oregon, United States. It is east of U.S. Route 101 on Oregon Route 53 along the Nehalem River. It is the smallest unincorporated community in the county, comprising approximately eight acres of land. Within the community's boundaries there are eight acres of residential land and community commercial land, in 15 parcels.

Mohler was named for A. L. Mohler, who was once president of the Union Pacific Railroad. The first post office in the area was established in 1897 and named "Balm". It was along Foley Creek about two miles southeast of present-day Mohler. In 1911 the name was changed to Mohler at the request of E. E. Lytle, who built the Pacific Railway and Navigation Company line into that part of the county. The post office was moved to the present locale of Mohler at the same time as the name change and operated there until 1959. The Mohler train depot opened in 1911 and served as the first station the train reached from Portland after leaving the coast range mountains to serve the Nehalem Bay area on its way to Tillamook.

In the early 1900s, Mohler was promoted as "the only logical shipping and distribution point in the Nehalem Valley," with business opportunities around timber, dairy, and fishing.

Mohler was the site of a major cheese and milk factory in the early part of the 1900s, producing as much as 4.2 million pounds of milk and 471,000 pounds of cheese annually. According to an article from September 29, 1922, in the Tillamook Herald newspaper, on the morning of September 26, 1922, the Mohler Creamery "was totally destroyed by fire," though it was later rebuilt. At the time, an article in the Oregon Daily Journal newspaper noted that the creamery, then owned by Rudolph Zweifel, "was one of the best in the state." Ruben B. Price, a cheesemaker from Mohler, won the 1950 National Cheddar Cheese competition. The Mohler creamery closed in 1959. Today, the old creamery building is home to the Nehalem Bay Winery.

In 1921, Mohler opened its only school. In 1929, the school closed after it consolidated with the nearby Nehalem School District. Today, the old school building is the home of White Clover Grange.

The Mohler bridge is a 314-foot pony truss bridge over the Nehalem River on Oregon Highway 53 near the intersection of OR-53 and Miami-Foley Road. Built in 1926 by the Portland Bridge Company, the bridge features two 100-foot steel spans and two 50-foot concrete spans. It includes about 15,600 square feet of coated surface which was painted in 2008-2009 at a cost of $1.2 million.

The proposed Salmonberry Trail, a nearly 90-mile hiking and biking path that follows the Port of Tillamook Bay Railway from Banks to Tillamook, will pass through Mohler.
