= C. H. Wheeler =

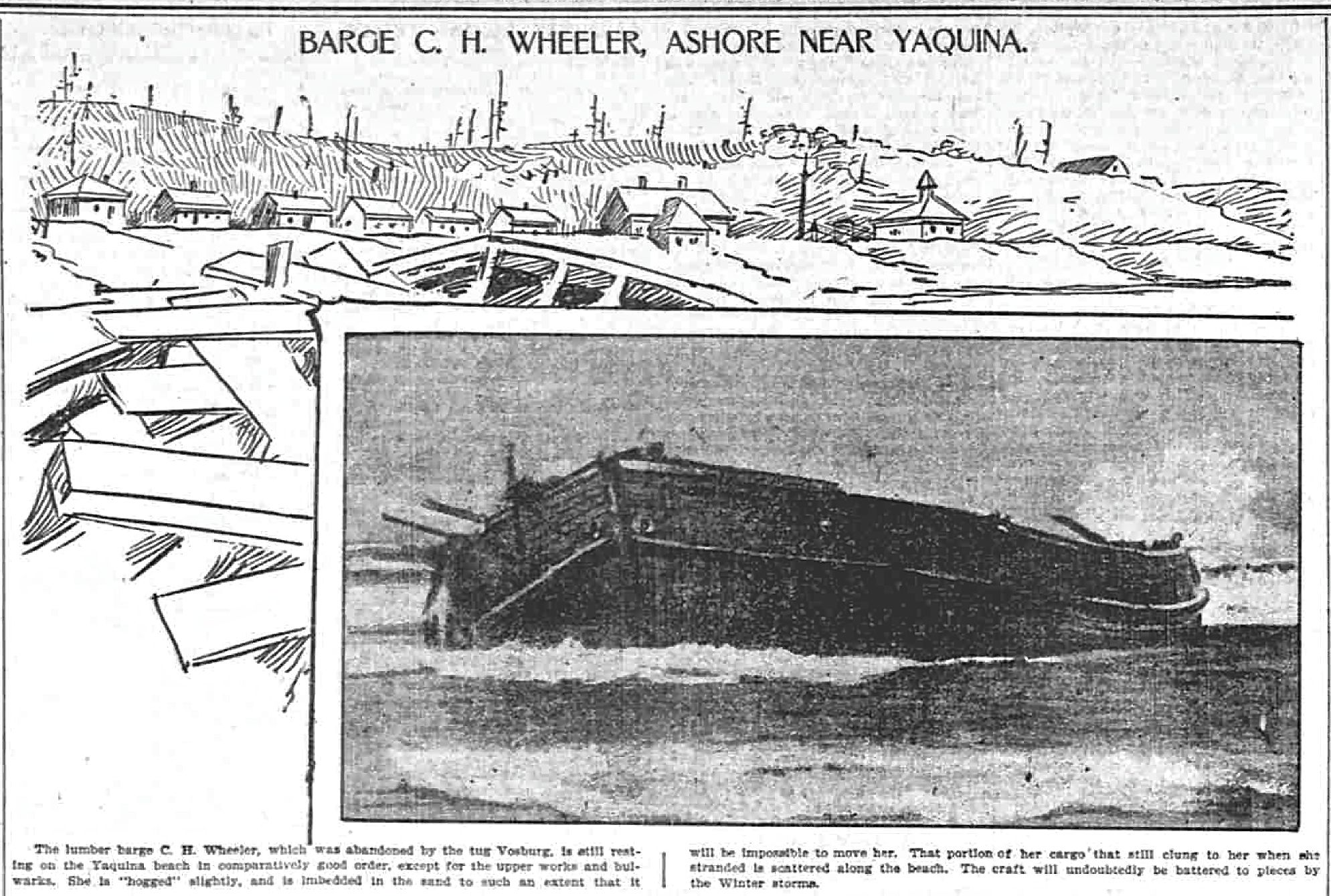
- Wreck of C.H.Wheeler, newspaper illustration from 1901

History
- Name: C.H. Wheeler
- Owner: Nehalem River Transportation Co.
- Port of registry: Astoria, OR
- In service: 1901
- Out of service: 1901
- Identification: U.S. 127490
- Fate: Wrecked near Yaquina Bay
- Notes: wooden construction

General characteristics
- Type: schooner-rigged lumber barge
- Tonnage: 371 gross tons; 356 net tons
- Length: 141.8 ft (43.22 m)
- Beam: 34.5 ft (10.52 m)
- Depth: 10.6 ft (3.23 m) depth of hold
- Sail plan: schooner
- Capacity: 562,000 board feet of lumber
- Crew: four (4)
- Notes: Built to operate with the tug Geo. R. Vosburg

C.H. Wheeler was a schooner-rigged unpowered lumber barge that operated during the year 1901, making only a few voyages before it was wrecked near Yaquina Bay with the loss of one life. C.H. Wheeler was the largest vessel up to that time to reach Tillamook City and the first vessel to transport a load of lumber from Tillamook to San Francisco. The circumstances of the loss of the C.H. Wheeler were controversial and resulted in the arrest (charges were subsequently dismissed) of the captain of the tug that had been towing the barge before it was wrecked.

== Construction ==
C.H. Wheeler was owned by the Nehalem Transportation Company, based in Nehalem, Oregon, had been incorporated in August 1900 by filing articles of incorporation with the Oregon Secretary of State. The company was capitalized at $12,000. The persons who formed the corporation were Coleman H. Wheeler, George R. Vosburg, J.E. Dubois, J.L. Vosburg, and J.K. Gambill. The same persons also incorporated, at the same time, the Wheeler Lumber Company, also based in Nehalem, with a capital stock of $40,000.

Wheeler was built simultaneously with an ocean-going tugboat, the Geo. R. Vosburg, and the plan was to operate the two vessels together. The barge was built to carry lumber cut by the Wheeler Lumber Company, which had the largest saw mill on the Nehalem River. This mill cut 35,000 board feet (83 m^{3}) of lumber for every 10-hour day, and it was intended to expand that capacity to 100,000 board feet (240 m^{3}) per day. As soon as the tug and barge were complete, barge would be loaded with lumber and the tug would tow the barge to San Francisco. It was also speculated that if a barge of this type could be safely towed in and out of the Nehalem, then coal mines could be opened in the area, with coal being shipped to Astoria and Portland.

Wheeler was launched on November 13, 1900, in Portland, Oregon, at the former shipyard of James B. Stephens. Originally, the barge was to have been known as Nehalem Transportation Company No. 1, but it was launched under the name C.H. Wheeler.

Wheeler had a sailing rig as a schooner. Gross tonnage, a measure of size rather than weight, was 371 and net tonnage was 356. The barge was 141.8 ft (43.22 m) long, with a beam of 34.5 ft (10.52 m) and depth of hold of 10.6 ft (3.23 m). The official vessel registry number was 127499, and the flag recognition signal was K.Q.M.T.

Wheeler could carry 400,000 board feet (940 m^{3}) of lumber. The barge was reported to be "an exceptionally strong one, although an odd-looking affair", and the tug was described as "rather small for ocean work". Another report described the Wheeler as a "queer looking craft about as wide as she is long with a stern like the end of a warehouse."

== Towing operations with the tug Vosburg ==
Wheeler departed Astoria on January 9, 1901, at 8:30 a.m. under tow by Vosburg on its first trip to the Nehalem River. Wheeler loaded a cargo of lumber at Nehalem and Vosburg towed Wheeler south to San Francisco.

Returning from San Francisco, on February 14, Vosburg towed Wheeler into Tillamook City by way of the then recently dredged Hoquarton Slough. Wheeler was the largest vessel ever to reach Tillamook City. While docked at Hoquarton Slough, Wheeler loaded 350,000 board feet of spruce lumber from the Tillamook Lumber Company's mill, and then took a further 250,000 board feet from the Davies mill on the nearby Trask River.

On February 22, 1901, with a little over 500,000 board feet of lumber on board, Wheeler in the tow of Vosburg, departed Tillamook City for San Francisco. This was the first cargo of lumber shipped from Tillamook City. Bar conditions delayed the departure from Tillamook Bay, but eventually Wheeler in tow of Vosburg reached San Francisco on March 7, 1901.

On April 9, 1901, Vosburg and Wheeler departed Nehalem for San Francisco again, this time with about 400,000 board feet of lumber loaded on the barge.

On Sunday, April 29, 1901, word was received in Tillamook City, by telephone call, that in trying to cross the Nehalem River bar in the tow of Vosburg, Wheeler went ashore on the south spit, and would probably be a total loss. Vosburg made it inside safely. However a further report a few days later, on May 9, 1901, was that both Vosburg and Wheeler were inside the bar, but could not exit (a status known as "bar bound") because the channel had recently become clogged with sand. Work was being done to try to reestablish a channel. By May 31, 1901, the channel was still divided but one branch was ten feet deep, and this permitted Vosburg to exit and proceed to Astoria.

On July 16, 1901, Wheeler sailed for San Francisco from Nehalem, again in the tow of Vosburg.

== Last voyage ==
=== Departure from Nehalem ===
On Monday, November 18, 1901, Vosburg departed Nehalem for San Francisco with Wheeler in tow. Wheeler had been loaded with 562,000 board feet of lumber.

Moving southwards, the tug and tow encountered high seas and a southerly gale, which caused Vosburg to use additional coal, and the supply on the tug was nearly exhausted by the time Coos Bay vicinity. To obtain more coal, Vosburg and Wheeler put into Coos Bay, on Thursday, November 21, 1901, and departed Coos Bay on Monday, November 25, 1901.

Nothing more was heard from tug or tow until Saturday, November 30, 1901, when Vosburg pulled into the dock at Astoria, without Wheeler. Captain Ahnes reported that while the winds had been light when they left Coos Bay, they encountered strong southeast winds off Cape Blanco, which grew to gale strength by midnight on Monday. Through Tuesday and Wednesday the winds grew worse, sea conditions were very rough, and both vessels were laboring heavily.

=== Towing cable breaks ===
At 7:00 pm on Wednesday, November 27, the 1000 foot long steel towing cable parted, and Vosburg lost the tow. Thirty minutes later, the lights on Wheeler, which had four men on board, could no longer be seen from Vosburg. Unable to find the barge, at 3:00 a.m. on Thursday, Vosburg started south. At 6:00 a.m. on Thursday the barometer fell to 29 inches of pressure, and for two hours the gale blew with the strength of a hurricane. On Friday morning, when Vosburg was off Yaquina Head, the gale moderated and the captain decided to head for the Columbia.

By Sunday, December 1, 1901, a new steel cable had been installed on Vosburg, and the tug was scheduled to coal up the next day in preparation to going out in search of the lost barge Wheeler. Meanwhile, no word had been heard as to the Wheeler's whereabouts or fate.

=== Wheeler wrecked in the surf ===
Wheeler was sighted again, however, by the crew of the Yaquina Bay Life-Saving Station, early in the morning of Wednesday, December 4, 1901.

When the towing cable broke, at about 70 miles off shore on November 27, the barge displayed lights and put up part of the main sail to keep the bow into the wind. The crew of the barge saw the lights of the tug for about 15 minutes after the tow line broke. When the barge crew was able to raise all the sails, the barge could still make no headway to windward, and instead drifted in a northwesterly direction for about 35 hours. Wheeler made a zig-zag course, governed by the wind strength and direction, back east towards the Oregon coast, eventually spotting the Yaquina Head Light at about 7:00 pm on Tuesday.

When the crew on Wheeler decided to attempt to enter Yaquina Bay, the barge could not be maneuvered through the entrance, and instead it drifted over into the breakers on the south spit. A big wave rolled the barge over, and two men, seaman M. "Mike" Yederman (or Olderman), of Nehalem, and the African-American cook, J.W. Coles, of San Francisco, were washed overboard. Coles was about 60 years old and disabled.

From the time they had been sighted, the life-saving crew had kept watch on the barge, and had supposed it to be the missing Wheeler. They took out the beach cart containing the life-saving equipment, and followed Wheeler along the beach. When the two men who were on the lumber came near shore, the life-saving crew were able to throw them a line and pull them in to safety.

Olderman, badly bruised and cut on his face and legs, clung on to a plank until he was washed inshore where he was rescued by a surfman from the life-saving crew. Coles, who had been wearing a life jacket, was last seen drifting around in the wreckage. Just before they were washed overboard, Cole had told Olderman that he (Cole) would be unable to live long in the water owing to the extreme cold.

The next wave washed the other two crewmen overboard, but they were able to climb on to the large pile of lumber which had been driven overboard, and had accumulated as a kind of raft in the lee of the barge, and in this way they reached the beach. Thirteen days later, on December 17, 1901, the body of J.W. Cole was found on the beach 17 miles south of the life-saving station. The drowning of Cole was the only loss of life in Oregon waters among documented vessels in the fiscal year ending June 30, 1903.

=== Salvage efforts ===
On December 11, 1901, at 8:00 a.m., Vosburg, under a new captain, departed Astoria for Nehalem, where the owner of the barge, C.H. Wheeler, boarded the tug. From Nehalem, Vosburg proceeded south to attempt to salvage the wreck of the Wheeler and its cargo, arriving at Yaquina Bay on the morning of December 12, 1901. On arrival, the barge was found to have been broken in two, and was a total loss. There was still 300,000 board feet of lumber on board however, and this could be salvaged, as well as certain equipment from the barge, specifically the steering gear, capstan, anchors, cable and rigging.

== Charges against captain of the tug Vosburg ==
=== Criticism ===
A number of people thought that the master of Vosburg had not done everything he could have to rescue the barge. The surviving crew of the Wheeler "severely condemned" the actions of the captain of the Vosburg, saying that Vosburg had recently taken on a fresh supply of coal at Coos Bay and that on board Wheeler there was another towing cable of better quality than the one which had broken. Later, "Mike" Olderman, who along with J.W. Cole, had been one of the first two crewmen washed off Wheeler into the surf, said they after the towing cable had broken, the crew of Wheeler had tried to attract the attention of Vosburg by building a large fire on the deck, using oil to increase its size. According to Olderman, the barge was not in danger until many hours later when the wind strength increased to that of a hurricane. Capt. W.H. Roberts, assistant inspector of the U.S. life-saving district of Oregon and Washington, who had made the inquiry into the circumstances of the wreck, wrote in his official report:

The abandonment of the barge by the master of the tug Vosburg is to be condemned. Had the tug been short of coal, which I believe was the reason given for running to the Columbia River, a plentiful supply could have been obtained by running into Coos Bay, some 25 or 30 miles distant. He could have then searched for and picked up the barge, which would probably would have prevented the loss of property as well as the loss of life.

=== Arrest of the captain ===
On December 27, 1901, Chris Ahues, the former master of Vosburg, was arrested in Astoria by Deputy U.S. Marshall Roberts based on an information filed by a sailor, Algol Peterson, charging that through criminal negligence and misconduct, the former captain had caused the death of J.W. Cole, and, in particular, that proper diligence was not exercised to attempt to rescue the barge. A preliminary hearing was held before United States Commissioner Thomson on the afternoon of December 28, 1901, and the case was dismissed because there was insufficient evidence to warrant prosecution.
