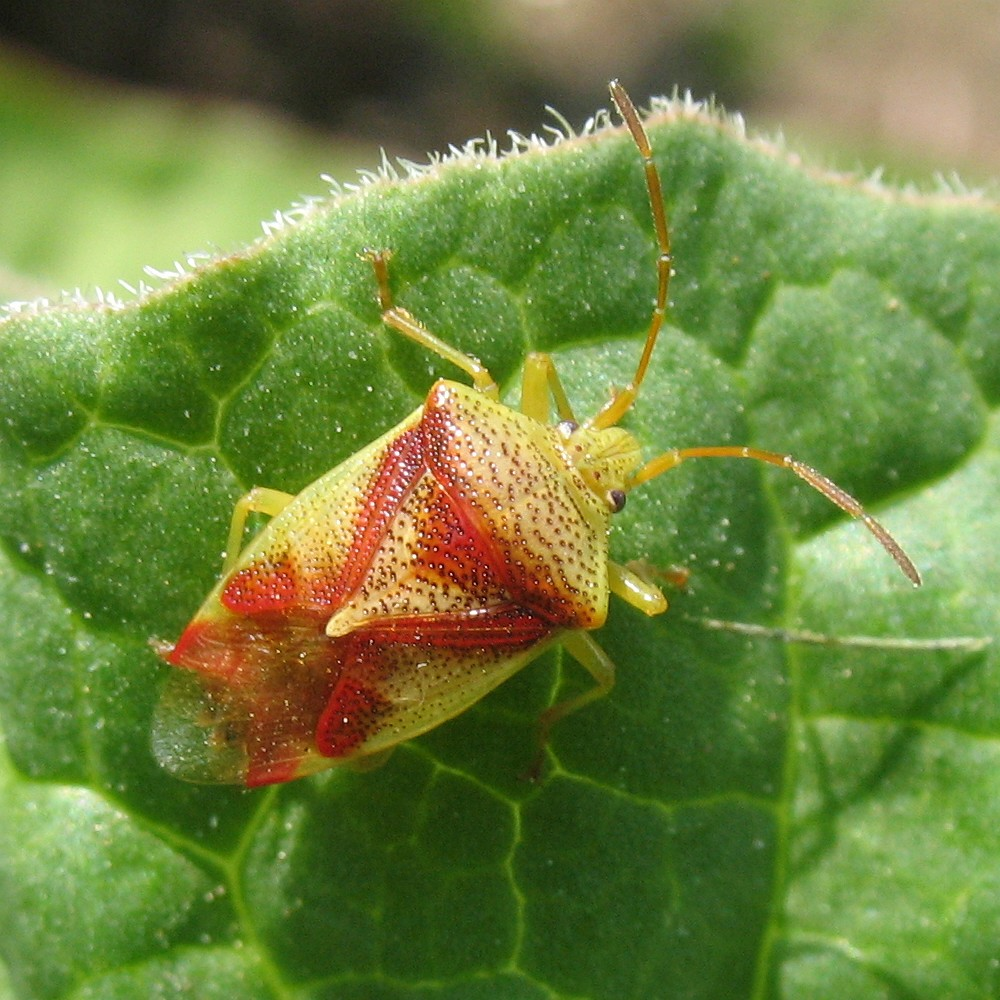

Scientific classification
- Domain: Eukaryota
- Kingdom: Animalia
- Phylum: Arthropoda
- Class: Insecta
- Order: Hemiptera
- Suborder: Heteroptera
- Family: Acanthosomatidae
- Genus: Elasmostethus
- Species: E. cruciatus

Binomial name
- Elasmostethus cruciatus (Say, 1831)

= Elasmostethus cruciatus =

Species of true bug

Elasmostethus cruciatus; known generally as the red-cross shield bug, redcrossed stink bug or salmonberry bug; is a species of shield bug in the family Acanthosomatidae. It is found in North America.

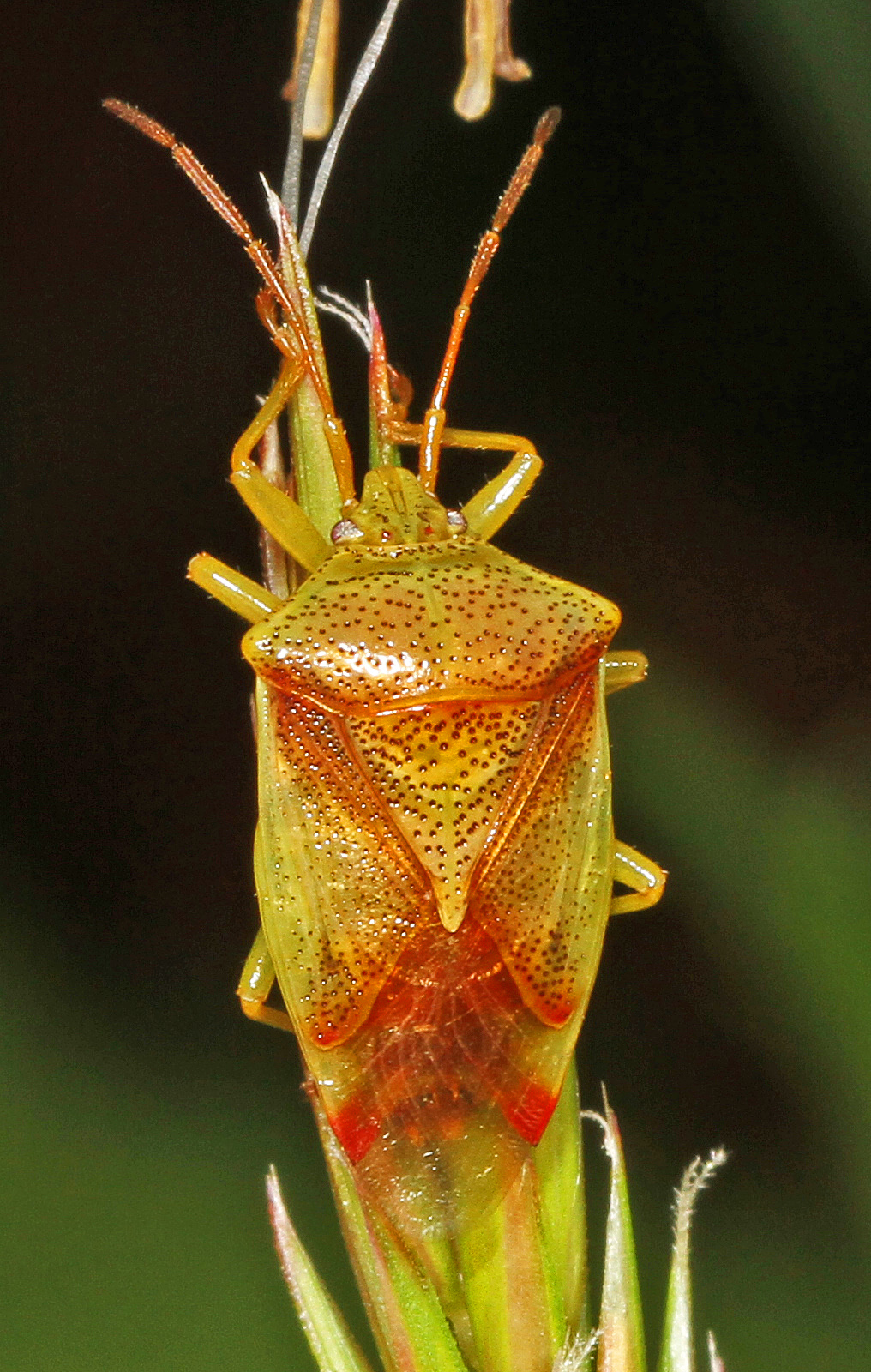
Red-cross shield bug, Elasmostethus cruciatus

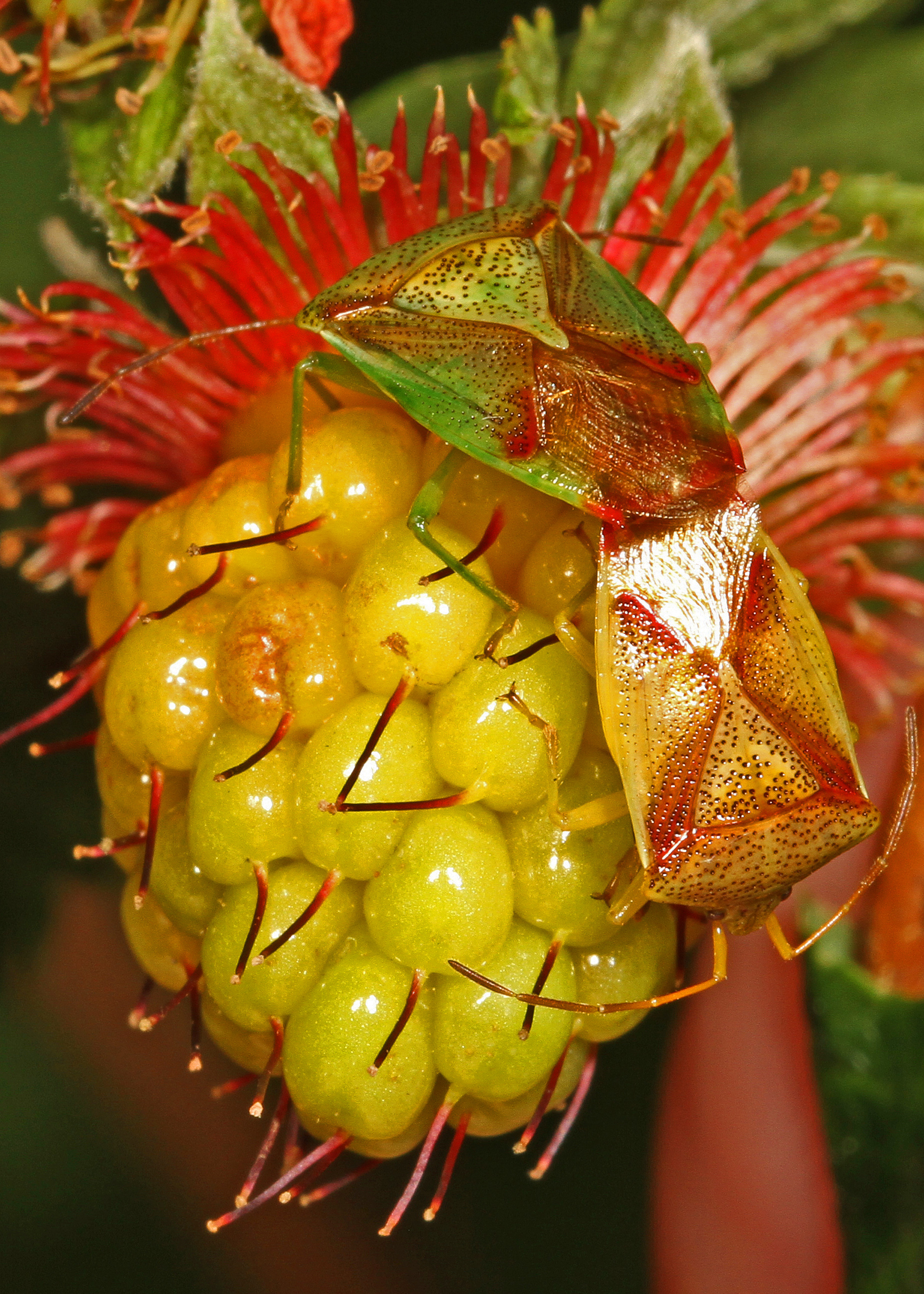
Red-cross shield bug, Elasmostethus cruciatus
