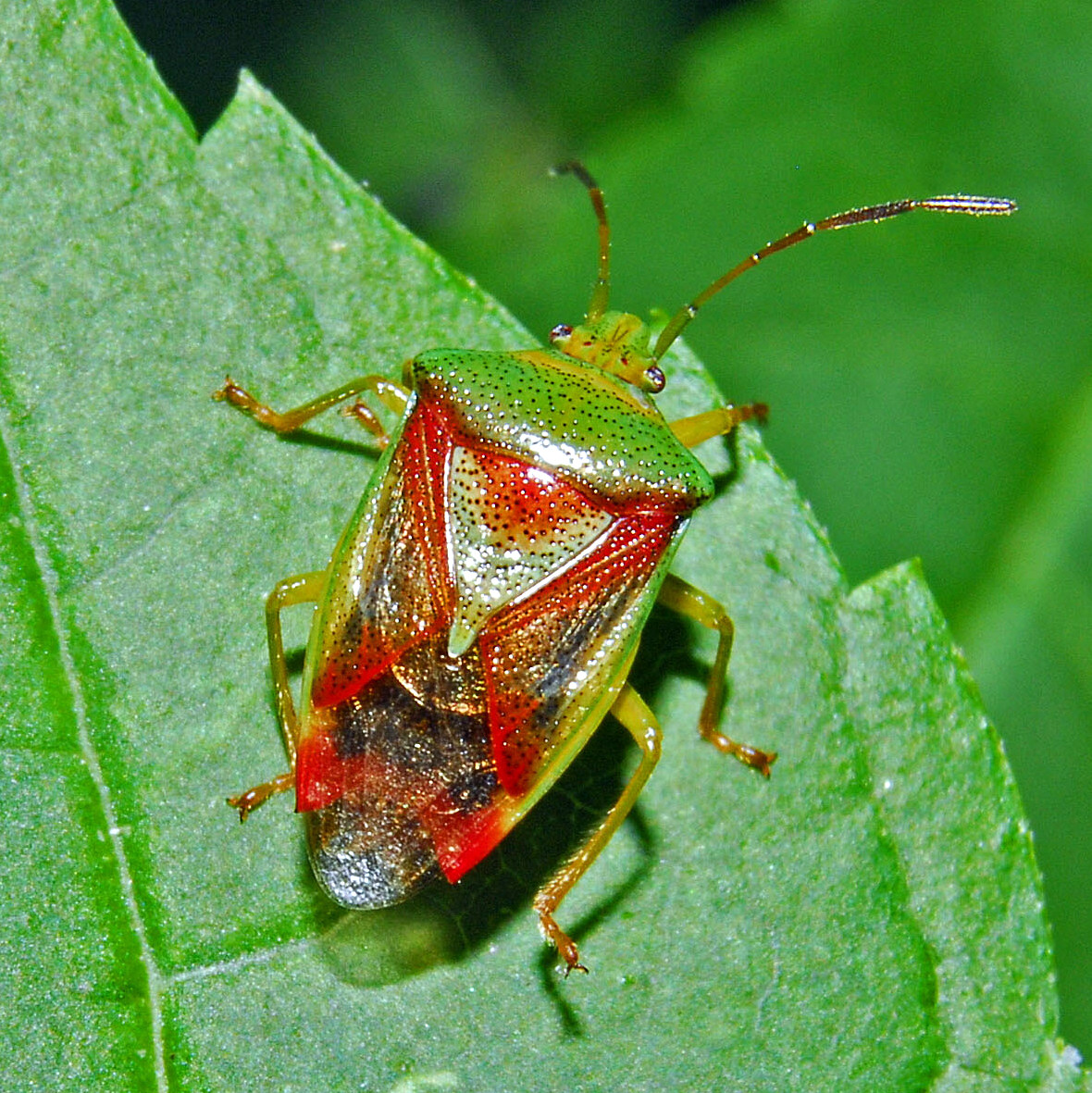

Scientific classification
- Domain: Eukaryota
- Kingdom: Animalia
- Phylum: Arthropoda
- Class: Insecta
- Order: Hemiptera
- Suborder: Heteroptera
- Family: Acanthosomatidae
- Genus: Elasmostethus; Fieber, 1860

Type species
- Cimex dentatus De Geer, 1773

Synonyms
- Cyphostethus Fieber, 1860; Dichobothrium Breddin, 1903; Ditaenius Bergroth, 1912; Oxydalus Mulsant & Rey, 1866; Stictocarenus Stål, 1871

= Elasmostethus =

Genus of true bugs

Elasmostethus is a genus of shield bugs belonging to the family Acanthosomatidae.

== Species ==
Species within this genus include:

- Elasmostethus atricornis (Van Duzee, 1904)
- Elasmostethus brevis Lindberg, 1934
- Elasmostethus cruciatus (Say, 1831)
- Elasmostethus dorsalis Jakovlev, 1876
- Elasmostethus emeritus (Fabricius, 1775)
- Elasmostethus humeralis Jakovlev, 1883
- Elasmostethus interstinctus (Linnaeus, 1758) – birch shieldbug
- Elasmostethus ligatus (Erichson, 1842)
- Elasmostethus lineus (Dallas, 1851)
- Elasmostethus nigropunctatus (Reuter 1881)
- Elasmostethus minor Horváth, 1899
- Elasmostethus sastragaloides (Breddin, 1903)
- Elasmostethus suffusus (Distant, 1900)
- Elasmostethus taeniolus (Dallas, 1851)
- Elasmostethus tristriatus (Fabricius, 1787)
