= George R. Vosburg =

American steam tug

- Geo. R. Vosburg exiting the bar at the Nehalem River (Neahkahnie Mountain in background at left)

History
- Name: George R. Vosburg
- Port of registry: Astoria, Oregon
- In service: 1901
- Identification: U.S. 86545
- Notes: wooden construction

General characteristics
- Tonnage: 99 gross tons; 59 net tons (as built)
- Length: 75.5 ft (23.01 m)
- Beam: 20 ft (6.10 m)
- Depth: 8.7 ft (2.65 m) depth of hold
- Installed power: steam engine, converted to diesel 1925
- Propulsion: propeller
- Notes: Known as George M. Brown after 1925.

George R. Vosburg was a steam tug that operated from 1900 to 1912 on the Columbia River and the north coast of Oregon south from Astoria to the Nehalem River and Tillamook City. Generally called the Vosburg in practice, and referred to as Geo. R. Vosburg in official records, this vessel performed many tasks, from carrying cargo and passengers, and towing barges of rock for jetty construction. After 1925, this vessel was renamed George M. Brown, and was converted to diesel power. Under the name George M. Brown, this vessel remained in service until 1968 or later.

== Construction ==
Vosburg was owned by the Nehalem Transportation Company, which had been incorporated in August 1900 by filing articles of incorporation with the Oregon Secretary of State. The company was capitalized at $12,000. The persons who formed the corporation were Coleman H. Wheeler, George R. Vosburg, J.E. Dubois, J.L. Vosburg, and J.K. Gambill. The company's principal place of business was in Nehalem, Oregon. The same persons also incorporated, at the same time, the Wheeler Lumber Company, also based in Nehalem, with a capital stock of $40,000.

Vosburg, along with an associated schooner-rigged barge, C.H. Wheeler, was launched on November 13, 1900, in Portland, Oregon, at the former shipyard of James B. Stephens. The cost of the tug and barge together were about $30,000. Vosburg was intended to be used to tow Wheeler, loaded with lumber, from Nehalem River to San Francisco and also to tow lumber schooners across the bar at the mouth of the Nehalem River. It was speculated that if a barge of this type could be safely towed in and out of the Nehalem, then coal mines could be opened in the area, with coal being shipped to Astoria and Portland.

On December 9, 1900, Vosburg and the barge were approaching completion in the Johnston yard in East Portland. Deputy Collector of Customs R.F. Barnes completed the official measurements which for Vosburg were 75 ft (22.86 m) long, 20 ft (6.10 m) beam, 8.6 ft (2.62 m) depth of hold, 99 gross tons and 59 net tons.

On January 5, 1901, Vosburg passed inspection by U.S. steamboat inspectors Edwards and Fuller and was granted a certificate. Vosburg was named after George R. Vosburg (1829–1901), a prominent businessman and one of the vessel's owners.

== Design and specifications ==
The Nehalem bar was shallow, but still thought to be sufficiently deep to allow transit of Vosburg and the barge, as vessels drawing three or four feet more water than the tug had reportedly crossed the bar without trouble. Still, it was expected, as indeed turned out to be, that Vosburg would strike ground often in crossing the bar, so the vessel was built very strong.

Vosburg was 75.5 ft (23.01 m) long, 20 ft (6.10 m) on the beam, and had a depth of hold of 8.7 ft (2.65 m). Gross tonnage was 99 and net tonnage was 59. The official merchant vessel registry number was 86545. Vosburg’s home port (where its official documentation was kept) was Astoria, Oregon. Upon its first arrival in Astoria, the tug was reported to be "rather small for ocean work". Vosburg had a coal-fired boiler which generated steam for engines producing 260 horsepower.

== Towing operations with Wheeler ==
=== Tows to San Francisco ===
The first captain of Vosburg was Ernest Loll. In 1901, Vosburg made several trips to San Francisco from Nehalem and Tillamook with Wheeler in tow, carrying lumber. Vosburg also towed Wheeler into Tillamook City via Hoquarton Slough, making Wheeler the largest vessel ever to arrive at Tillamook City and sparking the interests of local merchants in establishing a direct lumber trade with San Francisco.

During this time, Vosburg was sometimes prevented by bad weather or shifting channels from exiting the Tillamook or Nehalem bars. Vosburg and Wheeler were finally able to cross the Tillamook bar on Sunday, March 3, 1901.

=== Rumor of wreck ===
On Sunday, April 29, 1901, word was received in Tillamook City, by telephone call, that in trying to cross the Nehalem River bar in the tow of Vosburg, Wheeler went ashore on the south spit, and would probably be a total loss. Vosburg made it inside safely. However a further report a few days later, on May 9, 1901, was that both Vosburg and Wheeler were inside the bar, but could not exit (a status known as "bar bound") because the channel had recently become clogged with sand. Work was being done to try to reestablish a channel. By May 31, 1901, the channel was still divided but one branch was ten feet deep, and this permitted Vosburg to exit and proceed to Astoria.

=== Nehalem river operations ===
In September 1901, the newly formed Nehalem Coal Company engaged Vosburg to transport coal to Astoria from its mine near the mouth of the Nehalem River. On November 7, 1901, when Vosburg was at Astoria, Captain Crimm resigned as master and was replaced by Capt. Chris Ahnes. Vosburg was scheduled to leave for Nehalem as soon as the weather would allow, and from there tow a barge of lumber to San Francisco.

== Loss and wreck of the Wheeler ==
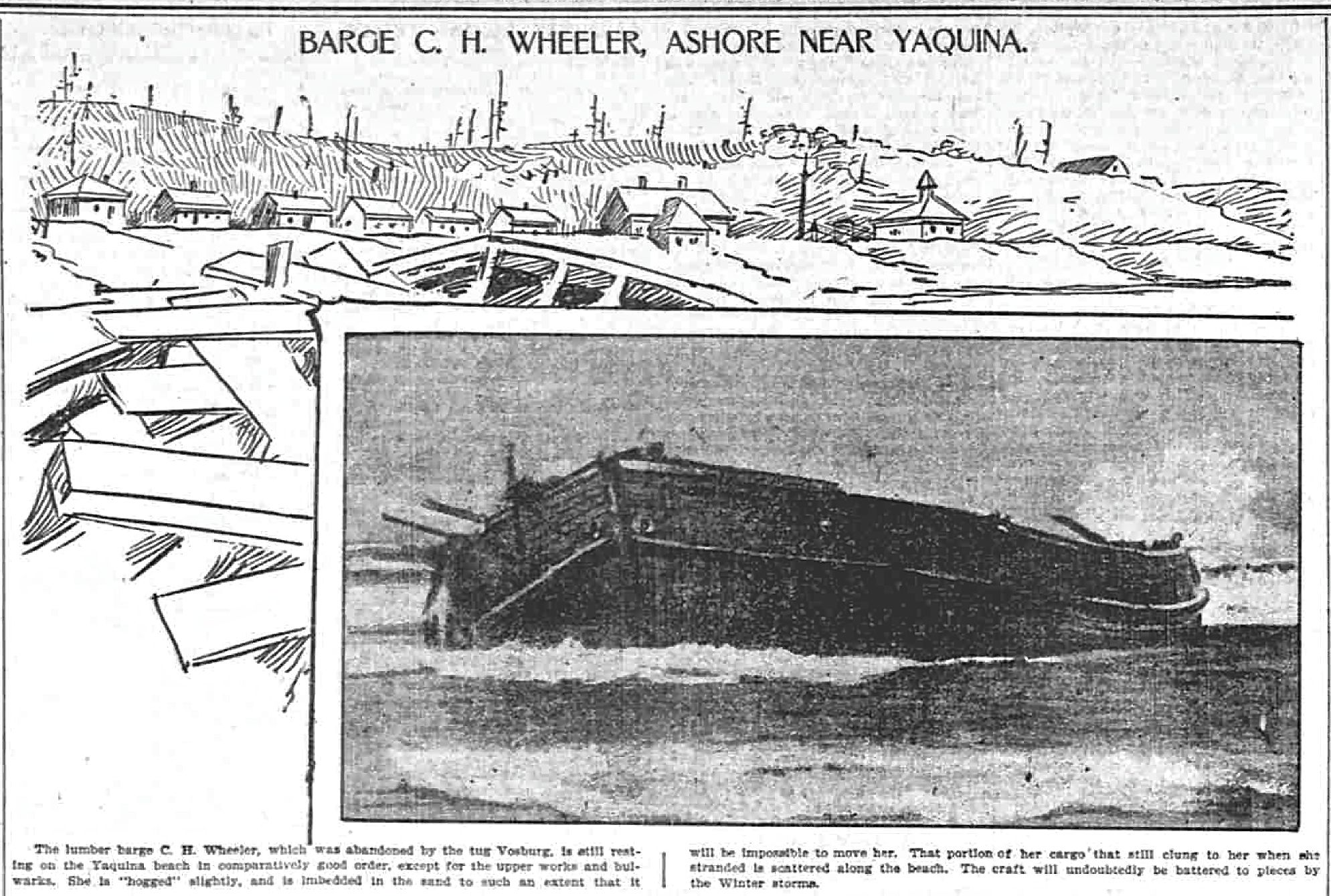
Wreck of the C.H. Wheeler as depicted in 1901 newspaper illustration.

The last tow of Wheeler began at 8:15 a.m. on November 9, 1901, when Vosburg departed Astoria for Nehalem, where it picked up Wheeler, loaded with 562,000 board feet of lumber, and both vessels departed Nehalem for San Francisco on November 18, 1901. They departed Coos Bay on Monday, November 25, 1901, after stopping for coal, after which no more was heard from either vessel until Saturday, November 30, 1901, when Vosford pulled into the dock back at Astoria, without Wheeler, reporting that they had lost the tow in heavy weather the previous Wednesday, November 27, 1901. Nothing more was heard from tug or tow until Saturday, November 30, 1901, when Vosford pulled into the dock at Astoria, without Wheeler. Unable to find the barge, and blown back northwards to Yaquina Head, the captain of Vosburg decided to return to the Columbia River, where, upon arrival, the tug remained.

It turned out that Wheeler, after the tow line had broken, had tried without success to attract the attention of Vosburg, and when this failed, gradually they were able to sail the barge on a zig-zag course back to the coast, where it was first spotted by the crew of the Yaquina Bay Life-Saving Station. Wheeler's crew tried to maneuver the barge into Yaquina Bay, but this proved impossible, and the vessel ended up in the breakers about 2 miles south of the bay entrance. All four men from the barge's crew were washed overboard, and one man drowned. The barge itself was a total loss, although some of its equipment was salvageable, and a good portion of the lumber cargo was recoverable.

A number of people thought that the master of Vosburg had not done everything he could have to rescue the barge, including the surviving crew of the Wheeler, as well as the investigating officer of the U.S. Life-Saving Service. Formal criminal charges were even brought against Captain Ahues, of Vosburg, resulting his arrest, in Astoria, on December 27, 1901, on allegations of negligence and misconduct. However, the charge was dismissed the next day, following a preliminary hearing, because there was insufficient evidence to warrant prosecution. Even so, Captain Ahues had already been dismissed from his position by the Vosburg's owners.

== Passenger service on Tillamook Bay ==
In February 1902, a new passenger cabin (called a Texas) was added to Vosburg. The work being done at the boat yard of Richard Leathers in Astoria. This increased the overall size (called tonnage) of the Vosburg from 99 to 106 tons. This in turn required Captain Loll, then the master of Vosburg, to have to acquire a new master's certificate, as his certificate was only valid for vessels under 100 tons.

By March 1, 1902 Vosburg had been "picked up" by the Nehalem Bay Transportation Company, which intended to use the steamer on the route between Tillamook and Astoria, in opposition to the Pacific Navigation Company, which for a number of years had had a monopoly on that run. Also in March 1902, the Nehalem Transportation Company announced plans to build a new dock at Tillamook City to accommodate Vosburg.

=== Fined for excessive passengers ===
After the addition of the cabin, Vosburg received a certificate to carry 12 paying passengers, however, on March 27, 1902, the steamer, under Captain Ernest Loll, carried 28 persons from Nehalem to Tillamook City, resulting in a fine of $500 being assessed against the vessel by the Astoria Collector of Customs, Fox. However, on April 3, 1902, a protest against this was filed by Vosburg’s owners, the Wheeler Lumber Company, saying that the customs collector had wrongly included the crew of 14, as well as several children, for whom no fare was charged, and that there were only 12 paying passenger on board. The steamer’s inspection certificate limited the crew to nine persons however. The fine was ultimately reduced, on April 22, 1902, to $5.

=== Rate wars and collision with rival Sue B. Elmore ===
In May 1902 there was a rate war on Tillamook Bay between the Nehalem Transportation Company, owners of Vosburg, and the Pacific Navigation Company, owners of the steamer Sue H. Elmore, As of May 13, 1902, the rate war had resulted in both companies running Vosburg and Elmore twice a week between Astoria and Tillamook, which was new for Tillamook, and according to a newspaper report, enabled "the creameries to get their butter to market in good condition."

In April 1904, another rate war broke out between the rival companies on Tillamook Bay. The original rates for freight were about $4.00 per ton from Portland to Tillamook for merchants, $5.00 per ton for smaller shippers, and passengers paying $3.50 fare from Astoria to Tillamook. Nehalem Transport Co., operating Vosberg, struck first, cutting freight rates to $3.00 per ton, and fares to $3.00 per passenger. Samuel Elmore replied with freight rates of $2.50 per ton and fares of $2.50 per passenger.

At 10:30 a.m. on April 12, 1904, on Tillamook Bay, Vosberg collided with Elmore while the Elmore was en route to Tillamook City. There was no injury to any passenger or damage to cargo. The estimated value of the damage was $150 to the Elmore and $200 to the Vosburg. The case was investigated on April 25, 1904, and as a result the license of master of Vosburg, Ernest Loll, was suspended for 30 days for carelessness and unskillfulness. The master of Elmore was exonerated. Vosburg was taken to the Joseph Supple yard in Portland, OR to be repaired.

=== Competition ended and freight rates hiked ===
The rate wars and other competition between Vosburg and Elmore were ended not long after the collision, when the owners of Vosburg sold their portion of the freight and passenger trade coming out of Tillamook to the owners of the Elmore. The Elmore now would handle all the freight and passenger business between Tillamook and Astoria, and the Vosburg would be engaged exclusively in towing logs from Tillamook and Nehalem to Astoria. As a result, the freight rates charged by Elmore immediately doubled, from $2.50 per ton to $5 per ton, causing a lot of complaints among the Tillamook merchants and talk of perhaps chartering another steamer to run in opposition to Elmore.

== Drunken Vosburg captain attempts to shoot peace officer ==
On September 5, 1902, Vosburg’s captain, Ernest Loll, had been drinking in the city of Tillamook, and became so drunk that Tillamook city marshal Clemons had to try to assist Loll to return to the Vosburg. Loll struck Clemons about the head, then fell down, got up again and ran to the Vosburg, where he soon reappeared on deck with a revolver in his hand, and fired five or six shots, apparently with the intent of killing the marshall. This caused a stampede of the people on the dock. No one was reported to have been shot. Loll was then arrested by J.E. Tuttle and Deputy Sheriff Stanley.

== Stranding of the Charles H. Merchant ==
On August 11, 1902, while outbound under tow by Vosburg, the old schooner Charles H. Merchant (built 1877) went ashore on the south spit of the Nehalem bar. The schooner was caught in the narrow channel of the Nehalem bar with a cargo 260,000 board feet of lumber. The conditions on the bar were too rough, and the captain of Vosburg decided to turn around and return to Nehalem. There wasn't enough room to turn however, and the tow went aground. The schooner quickly began to sink in the sand but there was a prospect that the lumber could be salvaged.

Legal action was later commenced against the Vosberg by the owners of the Charles H. Merchant. Although it was initially thought that the schooner would be a total loss, by the next summer, the Merchant had been removed from the sand, so the lumber in the hull could be salvaged and the schooner itself returned to service. In the legal action, the schooner's owners claimed that Vosburg was responsible for the stranding, while Vosburg’s owners countered that the schooner’s crew had steered it wrong during the tow over the Nehalem bar, and the Merchant’s old timbers were decayed, making it impossible to save the vessel.

One history states that Merchant was refloated, taken to Nehalem, and scrapped.

== Loss of rudder ==
On the morning of March 17, 1910, while outbound from Nehalem under Captain Rorvik, Vosburg struck bottom on the bar, jarring loose the rudder. Word of the incident was received in Astoria at about 10:00, and the coast guard cutter Armeria was dispatched to assist. As in turned out, the assistance was not necessary, as Vosburg met Armeria at sea, with the tug having been able to exit the bar before the rudder fell off, and then having rigged a temporary (called "jury") rudder once at sea. On March 19, 1910, Vosburg was towed to Portland for repairs at the Port of Portland shipyard in St. Johns by the steam schooner Casco. Vosburg was later reported to be on the ways at the St. Johns Shipbuilding yard. Repairs were complete by April 1, when Vosburg departed Portland bound for Nehalem.

== Quarry and Portland-Nehalem towing work ==
George R. Vosburg (large vessel on right) circa 1913 at Nehalem, Oregon.

In April 1905, Vosburg was in Portland undergoing repairs. At that time the steamer had been chartered by the Oregon Round Lumber Company to tow barges of rock from the Bunker Hill quarry to the government jetty at the mouth o the Columbia river and was expected to be back in service within a few days after April 22, 1905. In 1910, Vosburg was employed in towing work between Nehalem and Portland. During 1911, Vosburg was the only vessel regularly operating from Nehalem to Portland, usually towing the barge Nehalem, and was claimed by the Port of Nehalem to have transported 35,000 tons of cargo by earlier August, 1911.

In 1911, Vosburg, towing Nehalem, transported to Tillamook Bay rails and other construction materials sufficient to build 45 miles of the rail line of the Pacific Railway and Navigation Company from Hillsboro, Oregon, to Tillamook City, completing the work in March, 1911. The transportation work for the rail continued into the summer of 1911, with Vosburg towing Nehalem loaded with Items including a locomotive, steel passenger cars, and steel and wooden components for bridges. Once the rail line was complete, business fell off for Vosburg, and, after a five-week layoff for repairs in the fall of 1911 Captain Rorvik was putting the Vosburg back on the Nehalem-Portland run, this time to transport 11,000 cases of packed salmon, but was considering suspending the run if business continued to fall off.

== Driven ashore at the Nehalem bar ==
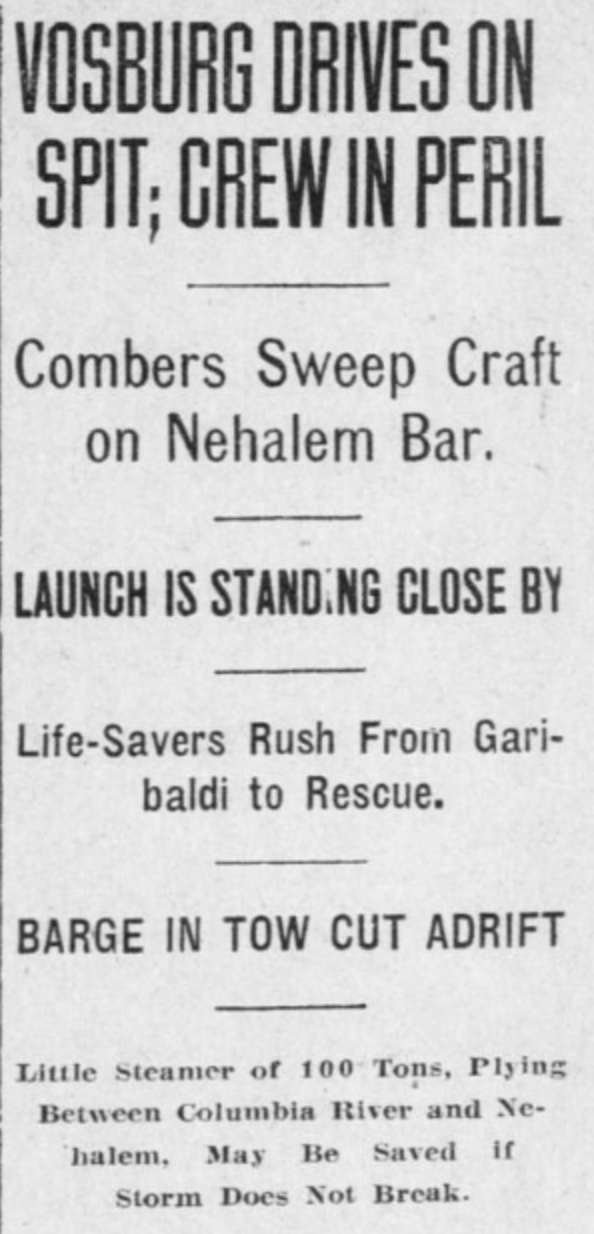
Headline from Morning Oregonian, May 4, 1912, page 1.

On Friday, May 3, 1912, shortly before noon, Vosburg, under Captain Erickson, while towing Nehalem went ashore on the north spit at the mouth of the Nehalem River. An initial news story reported that Vosburg "appears to be doomed to be smashed in two in a short time" and further that it appeared that "there is no hope of saving the lives of her captain or crew." Later reports showed the situation to be serious but not to the extent initially reported. The tug had struck bottom at about 11:00 a.m., and several huge combers broke over the vessel, aground on the south spit, soon thereafter, but after that the sea became calmer. Vosburg cut loose the Nahelem, which drifted into calmer waters.

The seven men of the crew on Vosburg remained on board until Monday, May 6, 1912, as did the two men on board Nehalem, when the personnel of both vessels were taken off by boats manned by the life-saving station at Garibaldi, who had rowed to the scene. Captain Erickson had been hoping to get Vosburg off the spit, and had kept the crew on board, but on Sunday night, huge waves began sweeping all along the tug's deck, and pushed the tug's hull into a rock, making a hole through which water began to pour in, flooding the cabin and extinguishing the fire in the boiler.

When on Monday morning it appeared that the tug might break up, Captain Erickson signaled the life-saving crew, which had been waiting on the beach since Friday, to execute a rescue. The rescue was difficult, with the lifeboat having capsized twice in the course of reaching the Vosburg. Vosburg was eventually salvaged by the method of dragging the vessel completely across the sand spit into the calmer waters of the Nehalem River.

Although one history reports that Vosburg was a "total loss", in fact by mid-August, 1912, Vosburg was back in service, towing a barge from Astoria to San Francisco. In November, 1912, work began on converting Vosburg from a coal-burner to an oil-burner.

== Converted to diesel power and renamed George M. Brown ==
In December 1925, Vosburg was purchased by the Anchor Towing Company, of whom Captain H.M. "Don" Brown, then of Newport, Oregon, was president and general manager, and H.G. St. Helens was secretary and treasurer.

Vosburg rebuilt as George M. Brown, on trial run; Captain Don Brown, and his young son, after whom the tug was named, newspaper illustration from 1926.

The new owners had the vessel "practically rebuilt" at the Mathews Shipbuilding yard, in Portland, Oregon, with the steam engine being replaced by a 360-horsepower six-cylinder Fairbanks, Morse & Co. full diesel C-O engine. The new owners renamed the vessel George M. Brown after the young son of the new captain. The boat, which was the largest tug powered by a diesel engine north of San Pedro, California, now had an oil storage capacity of 6,000 gallons, giving it a cruising radius of 3200 miles. In 1927, after reconstruction, Moore measured out at 98 gross tons and 48 net tons.

== Work on the Siletz river ==
On June 24, 1927, when the tug Mirene, owned by the Newport Navigation Company was towing a log raft out of the Siletz River, the raft grounded on the bar, and Mirene could not remove it. Later, the owners of Anchor Towing, H.M. Brown, H.G. St. Helen, and C.L. St. Helen, brought a legal action against Lincoln County Logging Company, which had the Mirene under contract, alleging that Mirene had signaled for assistance, and that in response, the George M. Brown had been able to get the tow off on June 27. Moore’s owner’s claimed that the Mirene’s owners owed them $1,000 for this assistance.

In September 1929, George M. Brown was engaged in towing log rafts from the Siletz River to sawmills on the Columbia.NEWSPAPER, Morning Oregonian The Brown used the dock at Taft during this work. During the preceding winter, a log raft had grounded on the Siletz river bar, causing the towing cable to wrap around the Moore’s propeller, and grounding the Moore as well. Occasionally weather conditions forced tugs to cast loose the log tows, a loss which was sometimes covered by insurance if in the summer, but there was no insurance coverage for log tows lost in the winter.

=== Lawsuit over lost rafts ===
The owners of George M. Brown were themselves sued in April 1928, by E.J. "Bud" Rowland, who claimed that the tug was supposed to have towed two log rafts from Siletz Bay to the Multnomah County Lumber & Box Company, at Portland, with delivery to have been made between early September and October 10, 1927. According to Bud Rowland, the first raft of 320,000 board feet of timber, was ready to be taken under tow on October 14, 1927, and was taken as far as Tillamook Bay, where the tug, it was claimed, negligently tried to cross the bar in a heavy sea, causing the raft to break free, and as a result became a total loss. The second log raft, comprising 258,247 board feet of lumber, was tied to a piling in Siletz Bay in later October 1927, but on February 6, 1928, the raft came loose and went ashore. Rowland claimed that as a result, it had suffered damages of $11,121. Ultimately, following a trial, the owners of George M Brown were found not liable.

=== Aground at the mouth of the Siletz ===
On April 8, 1930, George M. Brown, with a log raft in tow, and Capt. Mike Lollis in command, ran aground on the north sand spit at the entrance to Siletz Bay. The grounding was said to have been caused by cross currents and strong northeast wind. The tug Craig was sent from Taft to assist Brown, but itself went aground. Craig was able to get free, but sustained some damage. Brown was still owned by the Anchor Towing Company, but at the time was being operated for Lincoln County Logging Co. Two days later Moore was pulled free with the use of steam donkey engine.

== Swept into Morrison Bridge ==
George M. Brown jammed under Morrison Bridge over the Willamette River in Portland, Oregon, December 24, 1933.

On the morning of December 24, 1933, a mechanical failure on board allowed strong currents in the Willamette River swept the Brown under the east side of the Morrison Bridge, where the tug was stuck for two hours. Brown was being piloted by H.B Davis, whose wife was on board at the time, as well as seven crewman. Brown was ultimately pulled out from under the bridge by the tug Smithy. Mrs. Davis escaped by climbing ladder placed from the deck of the tug to the bridge. The tug was then reported to be owned by Paul and Bert St. Helens.

Brown had been moored at the foot of east Salmon street and had cast off lines at 8:00 a.m. headed for Columbia City, Oregon, on a salvage mission. When the air pressure was turned on to start the diesel engine, nothing happened because the compressed air tank was empty. The crew hurriedly tried to substitute a new tank, but there was not enough time before the tug had impacted the bridge.

Brown became wedged under the bridge at a 45-degree angle, and it was thought the vessel might sink. The Portland fireboat Mike Laudencklos, pumped out thousands of gallons of water waiting for other help to arrive. Damage to Brown, then thought to be worth $65,000, was estimated at $1,000.

== Later years ==
In 1935, the owner of George M. Brown was listed as O.F. Cooke, of Portland, Oregon.

From 1950 to 1962, George M. Brown was listed on the official merchant vessel registry as owned by Shepard Towing Company, of Portland, Oregon. The tug's radio call sign identification code was WA5325. From 1963 to 1968, George M. Brown was owned by Charles J. Scheene, of Portland, Oregon. By 1963, the engine horsepower had been increased to 450.
