= Salmonberry Trail =

Planned rail trail in Oregon

- Length: 84 mi (135 km)
- Location: Oregon state, USA
- Use: Hiking, Cycling

The Salmonberry Trail is a planned rail trail hiking and biking trail through the Oregon Coast Range along the Salmonberry River in northwest Oregon, United States. A portion of the Port of Tillamook Bay Railroad was washed out by a storm in 2007. In 2012, advocacy efforts to build a trail were launched, and in 2018, the Salmonberry Trail Intergovernmental Agency was established to oversee the development of the trail. The trail is currently closed to the public.

The Salmonberry Trail has four sections with a total of 84 miles. The coastal section is 26 miles long and runs from the city of Wheeler to the city of Tillamook. This section goes through the cities of Rockaway Beach, Garibaldi, and Bay City. This portion of the trail will also connect with the Tillamook Cheese Factory. Another section is about 17 miles from Salmonberry River and Nehalem River to Wheeler. One section is 16 miles that is along the Nehalem River. This section is most primitive of the four sections. The last section of the trail, 25 miles, is closest to the city of Portland. Starting in Banks and ending at the Cochran Trailhead, in the Tillamook State Forest.

Groundbreaking for a 0.6-mile stretch of the trail took place in Wheeler on July 12, 2025. A 3.2 mile stretch of trail in Washington County is planned for construction in 2026, running from Manning to L.L. Stub Stewart State Park.

== See also ==
- List of Oregon state forests
- Long-distance trails in the United States
- Oregon Coast Trail
