= Elasmostethus tristriatus =

Scientific classification
- Kingdom: Animalia
- Phylum: Arthropoda
- Class: Insecta
- Order: Hemiptera
- Suborder: Heteroptera
- Family: Acanthosomatidae
- Genus: Elasmostethus
- Species: E. tristriatus

Binomial name
- Elasmostethus tristriatus (Fabricius, 1787)

Species of true bug

Elasmostethus tristriatus, the juniper shieldbug, is a species of bugs in the family Acanthosomatidae. The species are green coloured with pinkish-red corium. They are 9–10.5 millimetres (0.35–0.41 in) in length and are active during warm months. They mate during spring. The larvae feed on berries, while adults feed on juniper. They also feed on Lawson's cypress.

== Life cycle ==
The larvae appears from June–September after which, the nymphs emerge. The nymphs have 4 stages until adulthood.
