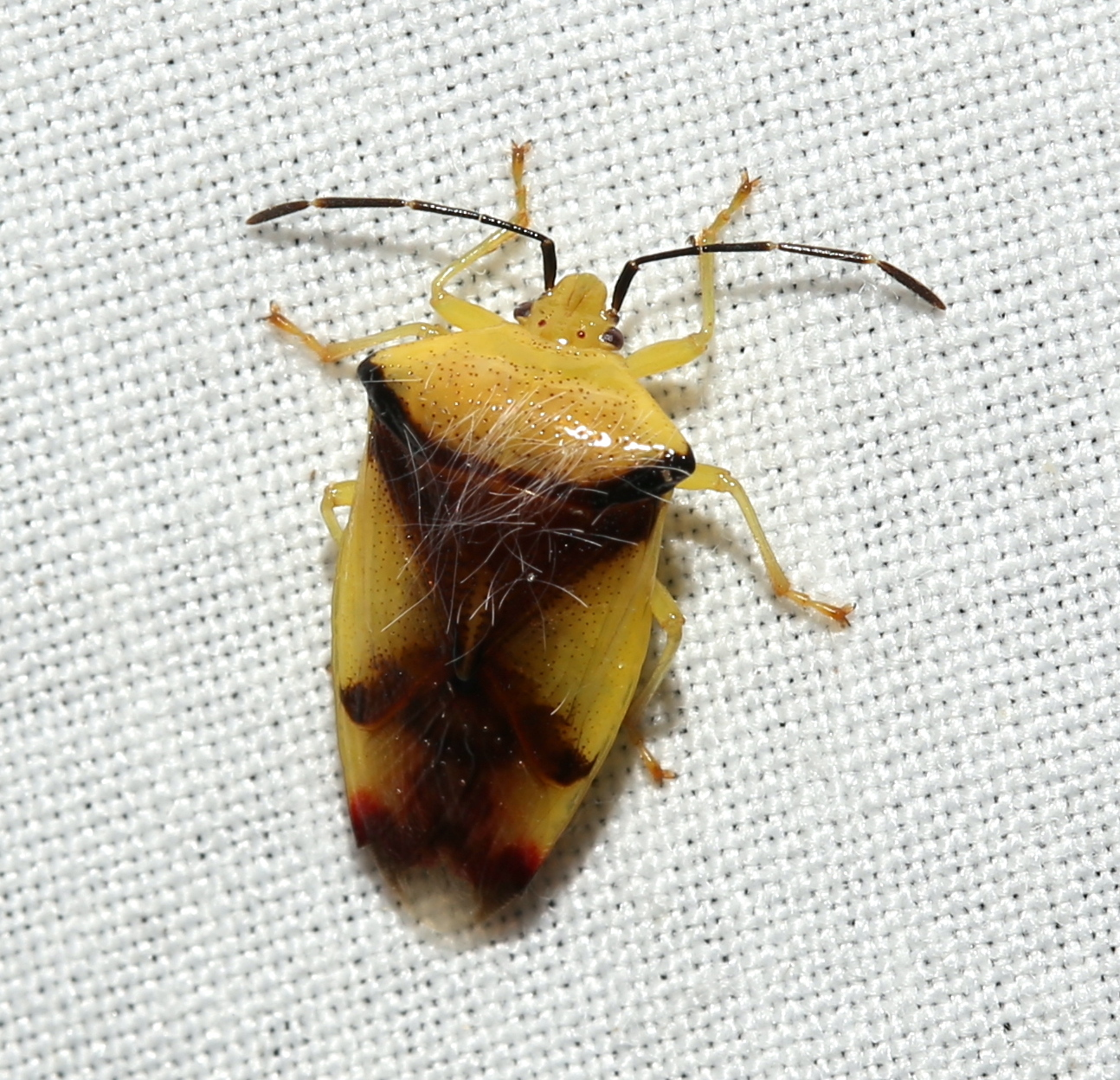

Scientific classification
- Kingdom: Animalia
- Phylum: Arthropoda
- Class: Insecta
- Order: Hemiptera
- Suborder: Heteroptera
- Family: Acanthosomatidae
- Genus: Elasmostethus
- Species: E. atricornis

Binomial name
- Elasmostethus atricornis (Van Duzee, 1904)

= Elasmostethus atricornis =

Species of true bug

Elasmostethus atricornis, also known as Hercules Club Stink Bug, is a species of shield bug in the family Acanthosomatidae. It is found in North America.
