= Salmonberry River =

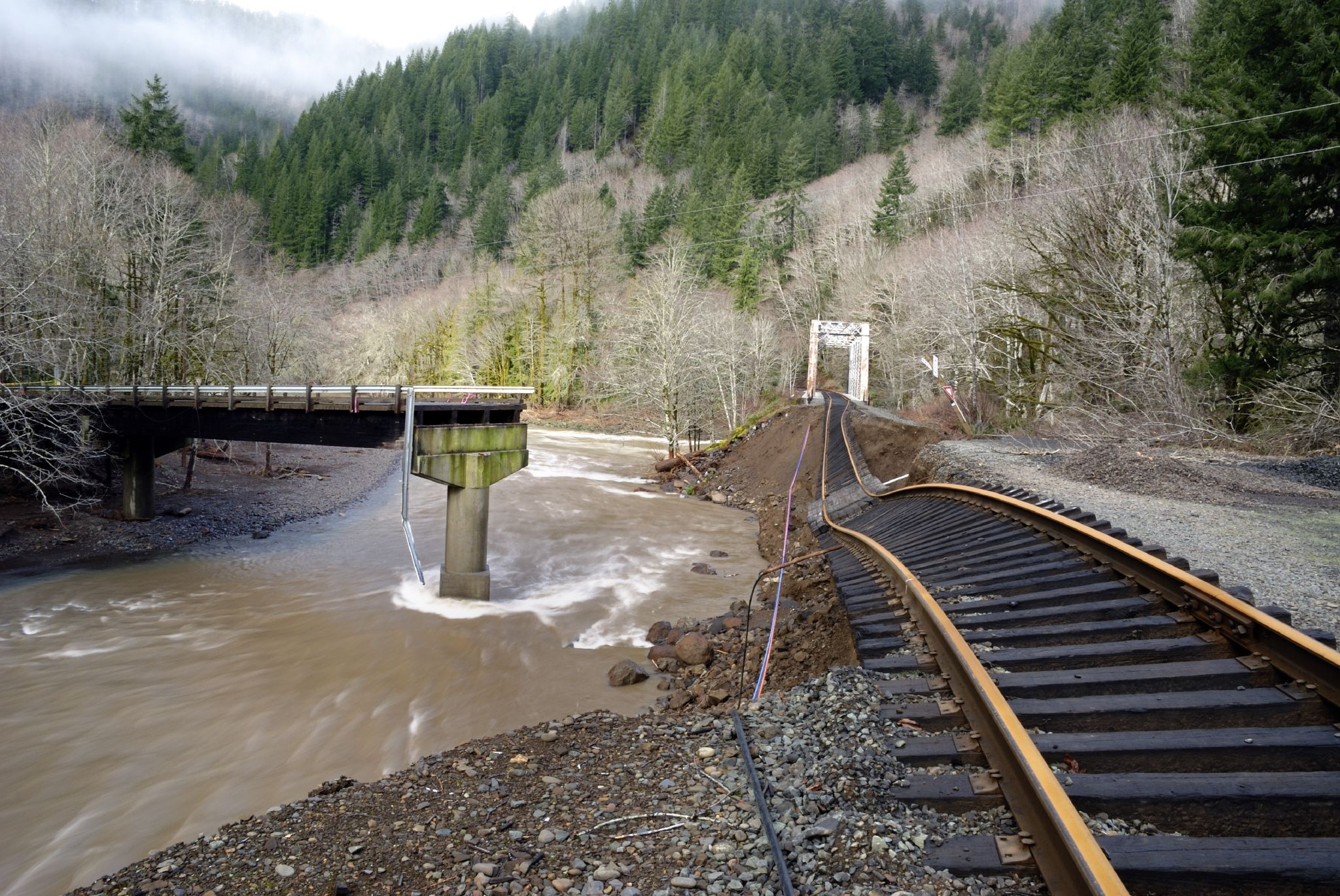
- The Salmonberry River and the damaged Port of Tillamook Bay Railroad in February 2008

- Location of the mouth of Salmonberry River in Oregon
- Etymology: Salmonberry plant, Rubus spectabilis

Location
- Country: United States
- State: Oregon
- County: Tillamook

Physical characteristics
- Source
  - location: Tillamook State Forest, Northern Oregon Coast Range
  - coordinates: 45°44′44″N 123°23′34″W
  - elevation: 2,090 ft (640 m)
- Mouth: Nehalem River
  - coordinates: 45°45′03″N 123°39′12″W
  - elevation: 236 ft (72 m)
- Length: 20 mi (32 km)
- Basin size: 66 sq mi (170 km^{2})
- Discharge
  - average: 350 cu ft/s (9.9 m^{3}/s)

The Salmonberry River is a tributary of the Nehalem River, about 20 miles (32 km) long, in northwest Oregon in the United States. It drains a remote unpopulated area of the Northern Oregon Coast Range in the Tillamook State Forest about 65 miles (105 km) west-northwest of Portland. The river runs through part of the region devastated between 1933 and 1951 by a series of wildfires known as the Tillamook Burn.

It rises in northeastern Tillamook County, near its border with Washington County, and flows west-northwest through the mountains, joining the Nehalem from the southeast about 15 miles (24 km) northeast of the city of Nehalem.

The river's name comes from the salmonberry plant, Rubus spectabilis.

== Railroad ==
An excursion railway and dinner train, the Oregon Coast Scenic Railroad (OCSR), travels up the Nehalem River canyon from Wheeler to the mouth of the Salmonberry. The train to the Salmonberry is part of an excursion-train network operated by the OCSR, a non-profit organization run by volunteers, on track formerly used by the Southern Pacific Railroad and the Port of Tillamook Bay Railroad. The railway track continues up the Salmonberry for 14 miles (23 km), but flooding and erosion damaged it so severely that it was closed in 2007.

The Wild Salmon Center and other conservation groups concerned about salmon and steelhead runs on the Nehalem and the Salmonberry prefer that the track along the Salmonberry remain closed. Of particular concern are landslides and herbicide spraying along the railway tracks in the river's riparian zones. Both kinds of incursion can harm fish and incubating fish eggs.

== See also ==
- List of rivers of Oregon
