= Port of Tillamook Bay Railroad =

Railroad transport company in Oregon, US

Coordinates: 45.419171°N 123.805397°W

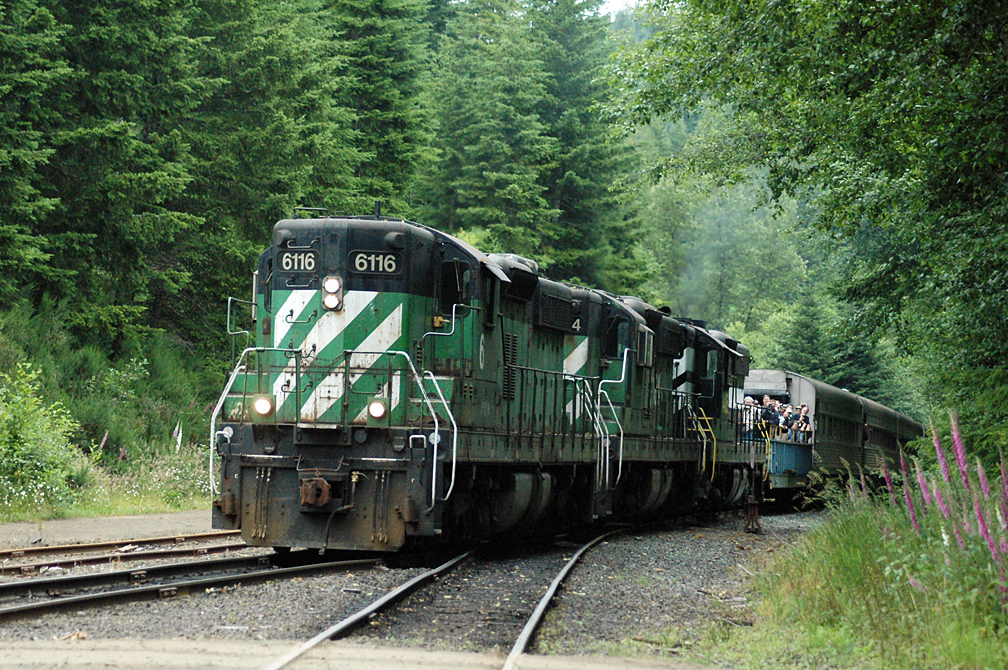

Overview
- Locale: Washington and Tillamook counties, Oregon, United States
- Dates of operation: 1952–2007
- Successor: Oregon Coast Scenic Railroad

Technical
- Track gauge: 4 ft 8 1/2 in (1,435 mm) standard gauge
- Length: 101 miles (163 km)

The Port of Tillamook Bay Railroad (reporting mark POTB) is a shortline railroad in northwestern Oregon in the United States. It was established in 1952 to handle switching in Tillamook, Oregon, and came to greater prominence in 1986 when it leased 94 miles (151 km) of the Southern Pacific Railroad's Tillamook Branch.

Purchased from the Southern Pacific Transportation Company (SP) in 1990 by the Port of Tillamook Bay, the railroad was used to transport lumber and agricultural products over the Northern Oregon Coast Range between the Oregon Coast and the Portland area until heavily damaged in a 2007 storm. The Port of Tillamook Bay began operating the unincorporated railroad on March 27, 1986, but the tracks were originally constructed by Oregon judge George R. Bagley and others in 1906.

The railroad's main line, no longer in use due to storm damage, runs between Hillsboro and Tillamook.

== History ==
=== Formation ===
The line to Tillamook was constructed by the Pacific Railway and Navigation Company (reporting mark PR&N) between 1906–1911. The Pacific Railway and Navigation Company, was sometimes known as the "Punk, Rotten, and Nasty" because of the wet and muddy working conditions for crews building the railroad through the Coast Range. The Southern Pacific Transportation Company (SP) took control of the company in 1915, and the line became the Tillamook Branch.

In 1943, the United States Navy established a short branch line within Tillamook to serve Naval Air Station Tillamook. The Port of Tillamook Bay created the Port of Tillamook Bay Railroad in 1952 to assume operation from the Navy.

=== Storms ===
In January 1990, the railroad was significantly damaged by a storm, and the cost of repairs was about $1.3 million. In February 1990, after having leased the railroad, the Port of Tillamook Bay purchased it from the Southern Pacific Transportation Company for nearly $2.9 million.

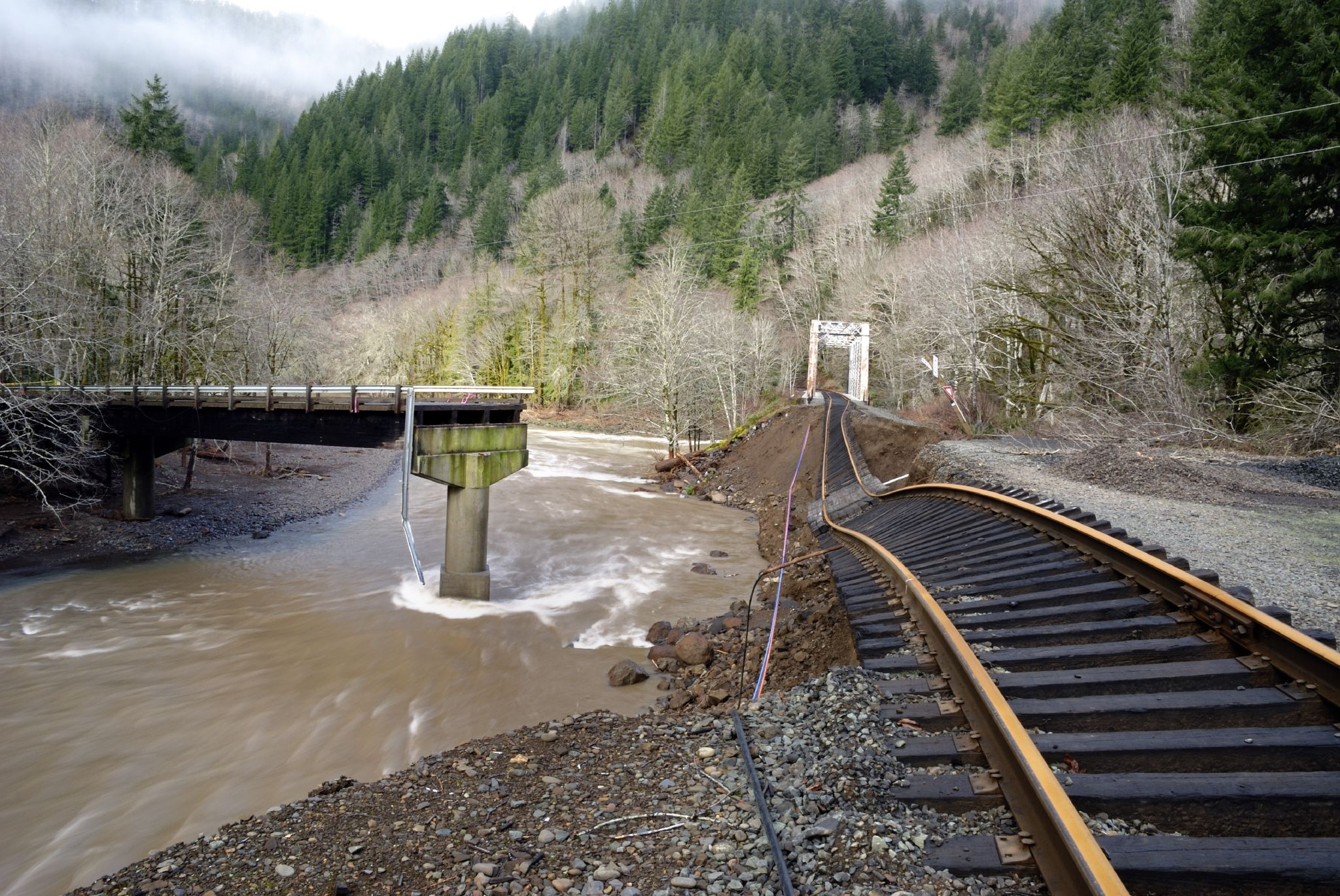
The Salmonberry River and the damaged Hillsboro–Tillamook line in February 2008

In February 1996, more storms damaged the Hillsboro–Tillamook line. About 7 miles (11 km) of line was "nearly completely destroyed", two bridges washed out, and the flooding Salmonberry River washed "boulders the size of cars" through one of the line's tunnels. A preliminary estimate of the damage, given by the Oregon Department of Transportation, was $5 million. In March, Oregon governor John Kitzhaber, convinced that repairing the railroad would not harm steelhead runs, permitted repairs to continue through the end of the month. In June, the state determined that the Port of Tillamook Bay had violated state environmental laws, such as by failing to control erosion in the Salmonberry River canyon.

==== 2007 storm and shutdown of the railroad ====
During a storm on December 2 and 3, 2007, known as the Great Coastal Gale, the railroad was again significantly damaged in the Salmonberry River canyon. The cost of repairs to the railroad was first estimated at $20 million. Tillamook County logging companies faced increased costs because they had to transport timber by truck.

When the repair cost estimate was revised to $57.3 million, fisheries groups suggested permanently abandoning the railroad because they thought "that economically, the railroad is not viable, and environmentally, rebuilding it would affect fish runs already hammered by last winter's storms". Workers began assessing the railroad damage in February 2008 in snowy, rugged terrain, and found that the flooding Salmonberry River had eroded steep embankments, damaging tunnels and collapsing trestles and bridges. Later that year, they hiked as far as 18 miles (29 km) each day to the canyon to further assess the damage. The Port of Tillamook Bay opted to not repair the damaged track over the mountains, but it still owns more than 101 miles (163 km) of railroad right-of-way, including main line, spurs, and sidings.

The port also leases a 3.5-mile (5.6 km) section of track from Banks to Hillsboro to the Portland and Western Railroad (P&W; PNWR) and leases the coastal portion of the line to the Oregon Coast Scenic Railroad (OHCR).

== Accidents and incidents ==
- On the night of January 28-29, 1999, POTB SD9E #4381 was hauling a string of freight cars from one track to another at Cochran Summit Wye in Timber, Oregon, when the locomotive crashed into a tree. The locomotive was retired and scrapped in April 1999.

== Locomotive fleet ==
The following locomotives listed here are locomotives used by the Port of Tillamook Bay Railroad (POTB). Most of which were scrapped at the Tillamook Air Museum based in Tillamook, Oregon.

Photograph	Road No.	Model	Build date	Serial No.	Former No.	Disposition	Notes	Refs.
	101	EMD GP9	6/1956	21703	INPR 101	In operation at Oregon Coast Scenic Railroad since 2008		
	110	GE 80-ton switcher	10/1943	18059	US Navy 65-00285	Scrapped in 1994		
	111	GE 80-ton switcher	12/1943	18067	LP&N #80	Scrapped in 1998		
	3771	EMD GP9E	12/1956	22900	SP 3771	Scrapped in 2010		
	4368	EMD SD9E	4/1955	20203	SP 4368	Scrapped in 2010		
	4381	EMD SD9E	3/1955	19945	SP 4381	Involved in a wreck in January 1999, retired in April 1999 and scrapped		
	4405	EMD SD9E	4/1955	19986	SP 4405	Scrapped in 2010, front hood at Astoria Riverfront Trolley Shed		
	4406	EMD SD9E	4/1955	19983	SP 4406	Scrapped in 2022		
	4414	EMD SD9E	4/1956	21314	SP 4414	Scrapped in 2010		
	4432	EMD SD9E	4/1955	19951	SP 4432	Scrapped in 2010		
	6113	EMD SD9	1/1957	22488	BNSF 6113	Scrapped in 2009		
	6114	EMD SD9	1/1957	22489	BNSF 6114	Scrapped in 2010		
	6116	EMD SD9	4/1959	25013	BNSF 6116	Scrapped in 2018		
	6124	EMD SD9	4/1959	25015	BNSF 6124	Scrapped in 2010		
	6139	EMD SD9	12/1954	20121	BNSF 6139	Sold to Oregon Coast Scenic Railroad in 2017		
	6156	EMD SD9	8/1955	20564	BNSF 6156	Scrapped in 2009		
	6157	EMD SD9	8/1955	20565	BNSF 6157	Scrapped in 2009		
	6164	EMD SD9	9/1955	20572	BNSF 6164	Scrapped in 2012		
	6178	EMD SD9	10/1957	23610	BNSF 6178	Scrapped in 2009		
	6196	EMD SD9	8/1957	23628	BNSF 6196	Scrapped in 2009		

== Oregon Coast Scenic Railroad ==
The Oregon Coast Scenic Railroad (OCSR), a non-profit museum group, operates a heritage railroad in conjunction with the POTB that runs tourist trains on a portion of POTB track from Garibaldi north to Rockaway Beach. as well as various excursions from Wheeler to Batterson, Oregon. As of 2011, OCSR was negotiating a contract with the port commission to perform track maintenance in exchange for controlling the scheduling along the portion of the line. There is disagreement between the port authority and OCSR about the percentage of ticket revenues to be paid to POTB. OCSR wanted an agreement with POTB as assurance that if the scenic railroad invests $30,000 to $40,000 in a building to house a new, larger train engine, that the tracks would not be used for another purpose. Meanwhile, the port commission said it had received an offer of more than $4 million to sell the railroad for scrap, an amount that would pay off the nearly $1.7 million in debts the port has accrued on the railroad. A former port commissioner speaking on behalf of OCSR believed, however, that the port would have trouble gaining federal approval to completely abandon the rail line.

In March 2012, OCSR agreed to lease from POTB 46 miles (74 km) of line from the Salmonberry River to Tillamook. This would effectively make the entire line a tourist railroad. OCSR plans to extend services to Tillamook as soon as practicable, with extension to the north a future possibility.

== See also ==
- Salmonberry Trail

== Bibliography ==
- Burkhardt, D. C. Jesse (1994). Backwoods Railroads: Branchlines and Shortlines of Western Oregon (1st ed.). Washington State University Press. ISBN 9780874221046.
- Clock, Paul Michael (2000). The Saga of Pacific Railway & Navigation Co: Punk Rotten & Nasty. Corbett Press. ISBN 0966898702.
- Hofsommer, Don L. (1986). The Southern Pacific, 1901-1985. College Station, Texas: Texas A&M University Press. ISBN 978-0-89096-246-6.
- Lewis, Edward A. (1996). American Shortline Railway Guide (5th ed.). Waukesha, WI: Kalmbach Publishing. ISBN 0-89024-290-9. OCLC 35286187. OL 617324M.
- Lockley, Fred (1928). History of the Columbia River Valley From the Dalles to the Sea. Chicago, Illinois: S. J. Clarke Publishing.
- Robertson, Donald B. (1995). Encyclopedia of Western Railroad History. Caldwell, Idaho: The Caxton Printers, Ltd. ISBN 978-0-87004-366-6.
