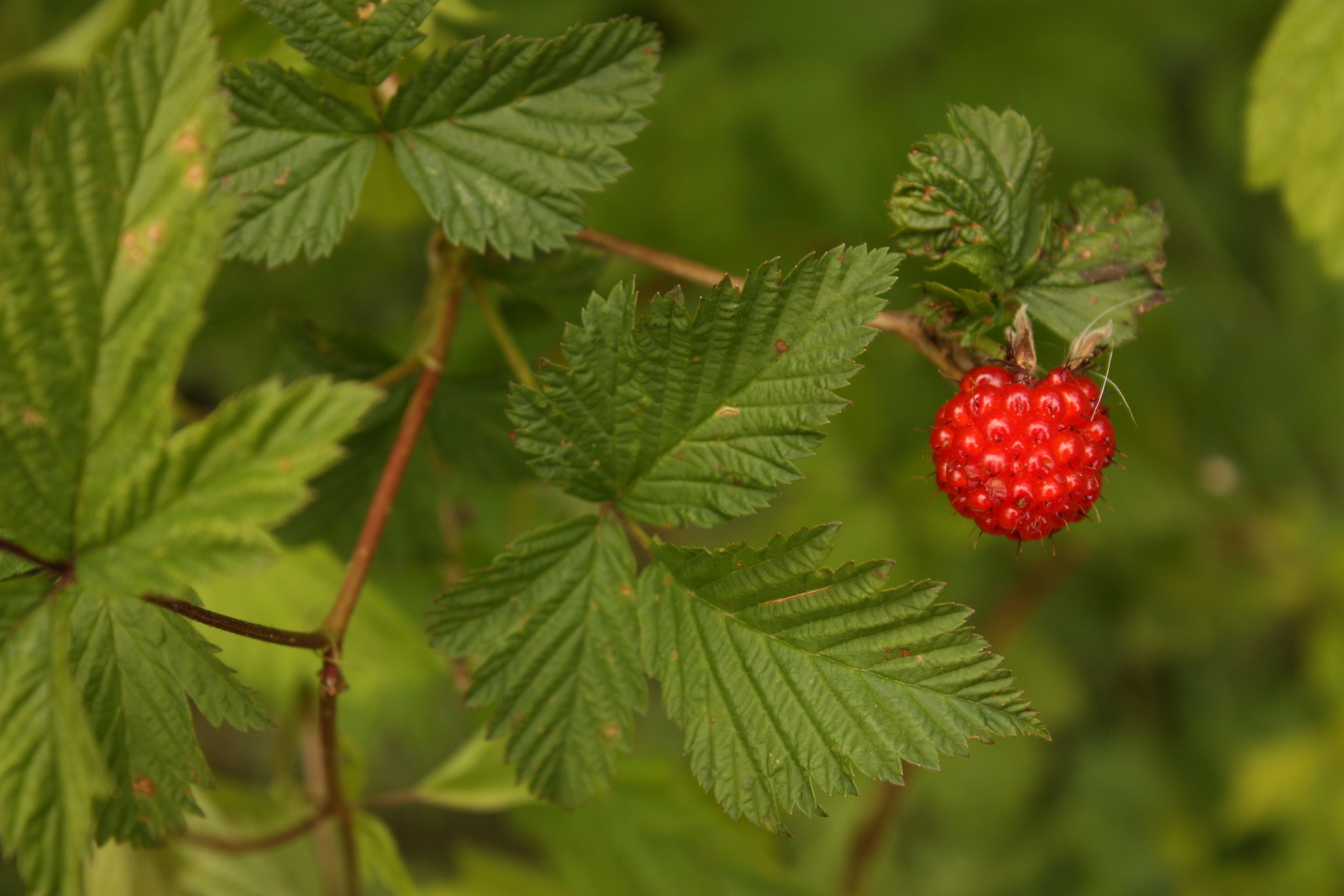

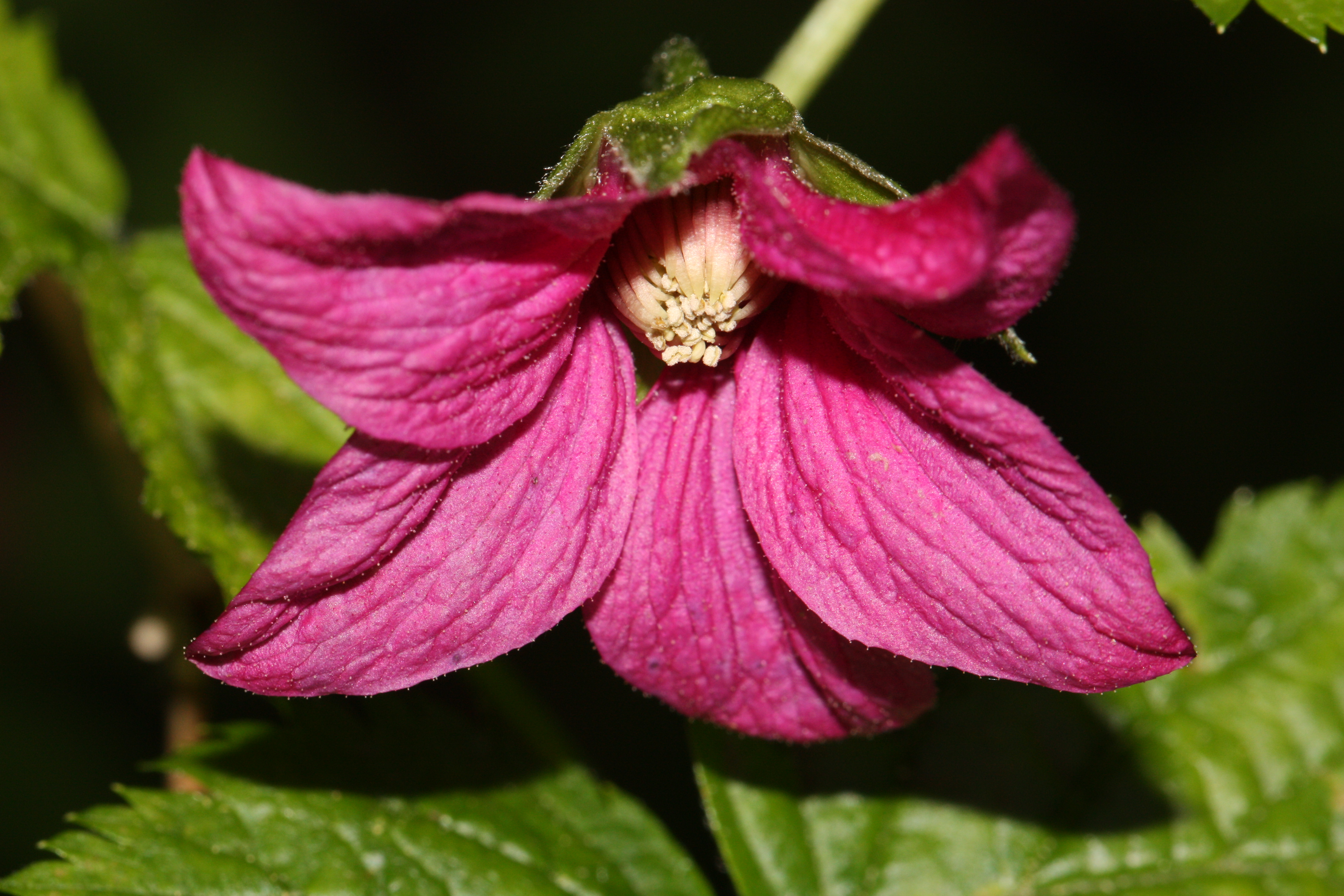

Scientific classification
- Kingdom: Plantae
- Clade: Tracheophytes
- Clade: Angiosperms
- Clade: Eudicots
- Clade: Rosids
- Order: Rosales
- Family: Rosaceae
- Genus: Rubus
- Species: R. spectabilis

Binomial name
- Rubus spectabilis Pursh 1813 not E.James 1825 nor Mercier 1861

Synonyms
- List: Parmena spectabilis (Pursh) Greene; Rubus franciscanus Rydb.; Rubus spectabilis var. franciscanus (Rydb.) J.T.Howell; Rubus spectabilis var. menziesii (Hook.) S.Watson; Rubus stenopetalus Cham.

= Rubus spectabilis =

Salmonberry

Plant species

Rubus spectabilis, the salmonberry, is a species of bramble native to the west coast of North America. Its fruit is typically yellow-orange or red, resembling raspberries. The plant grows in the wild, and is not cultivated.

== Distribution ==
The plant is native to the west coast of North America from west-central Alaska to California, and inland as far as Idaho.

Where the species is not native, it is considered a highly invasive, non-native species as it forms large, vigorous stands that exclude practically all other vegetation, with significant ecological impacts. It was introduced to the United Kingdom in 1827 and found in the wild by 1899. As of 2026, salmonberry has a patchy distribution in northern Great Britain, occurring commonly in northwest England and in central to north-eastern Scotland, and rarely in central to southern England. From 1970 to 1999, its distribution in Britain more than doubled.

== Description ==
Rubus spectabilis is a deciduous, rhizomatous shrub growing to 1–4 metres (3 1/2–13 feet) tall and 9 m (30 ft) wide, with a moderate growth rate of 0.3–0.6 m (1–2 ft) per year. 30–40% of the plant's biomass is underground. It has perennial (not biennial) woody stems that are covered with fine prickles, especially on new growth. The plant has golden or yellowish brown erect or arching stems (also known as "canes") that often form thickets, like many other brambles.

The leaves are alternate, trifoliate (with three leaflets), 7–22 centimetres (3–8 1/2 inches) long and typically ovate in shape, with the terminal leaflet being larger than the two side leaflets, which are sometimes shallowly lobed. The margins of the leaflets are doubly serrate. The leaves are also stipulate and are smooth to slightly hairy on the top surface, compared to the underside, which are typically more pale and hairy. In late fall and winter months, salmonberry leaves will fall, and the plant remains dormant or maintains minimal shoot elongation during the winter.

The flowers are 2–3 cm (3/4–1 1/4 in) in diameter, with a calyx of five hairy sepals and five pinkish-purple petals that surround a cluster of stamens; they are produced between April and July, either singly or in clusters of 2 or 3. The flowers are perfect (bisexual), containing 75–100 stamens and many individual pistils with superior ovaries. While fruit production is largely dependent on the environment, there is an estimated growth of 30 fruits per 3 square metres (32 sq ft) and 17–65 seeds per fruit. Salmonberry sprout mainly from the buds found on rhizomes, stumps, and root crowns of the plant. The flowers cannot self-pollinate and are instead pollinated by insects, hummingbirds, and beetles.

Salmonberries ripen approximately 30–36 days after pollination, from early May to late July in most of the Pacific Northwest and July to August in cooler Northern climates. They are 1.5–2 cm (1/2–3/4 in) long and resemble large shiny yellow to dark-red raspberries. The fruit pulls away from its receptacle, differentiating it from blackberries. Botanically speaking, the salmonberry is not a true berry, but instead an aggregate fruit made of many smaller drupelets.

=== Fruit polymorphism ===
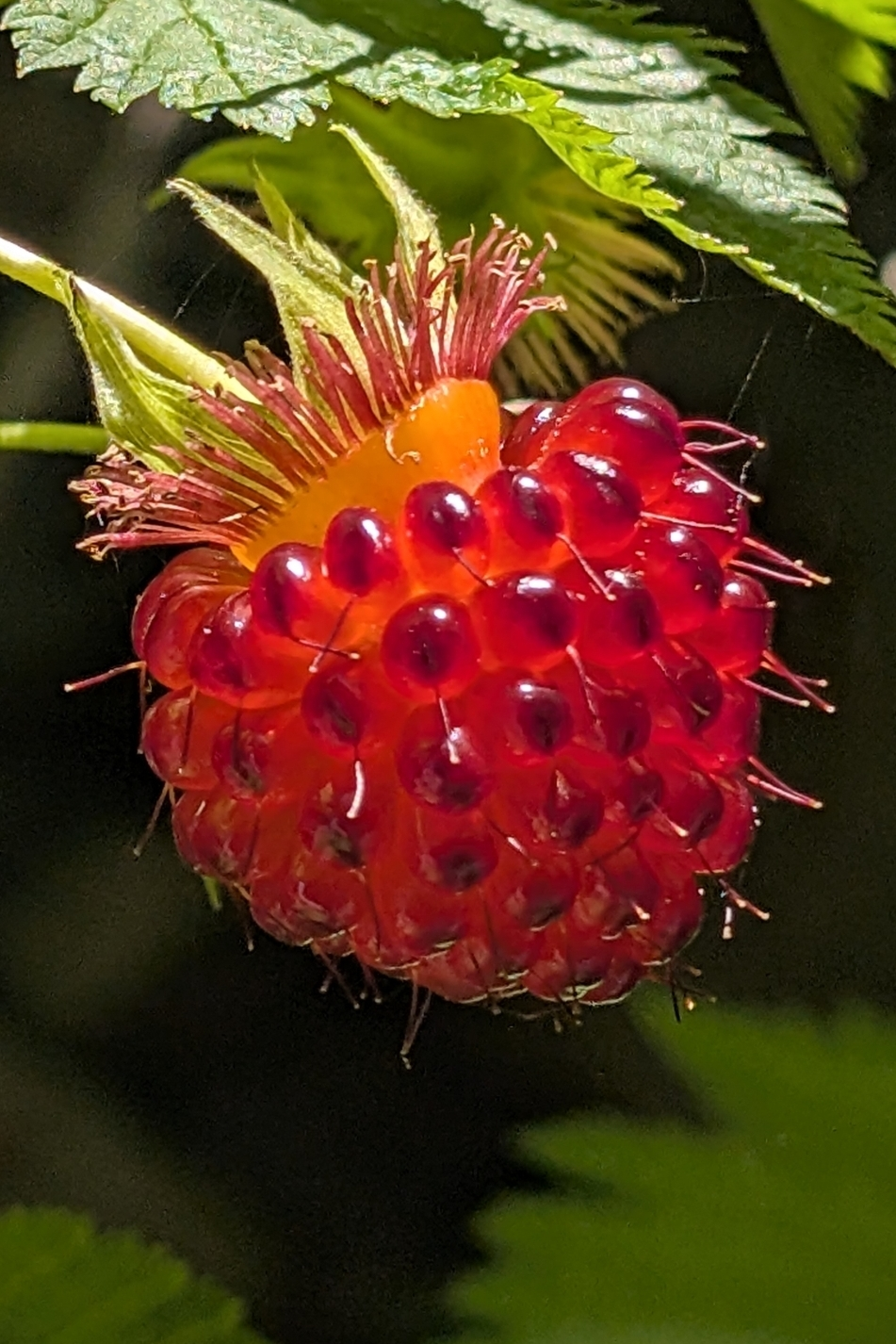
Red morph

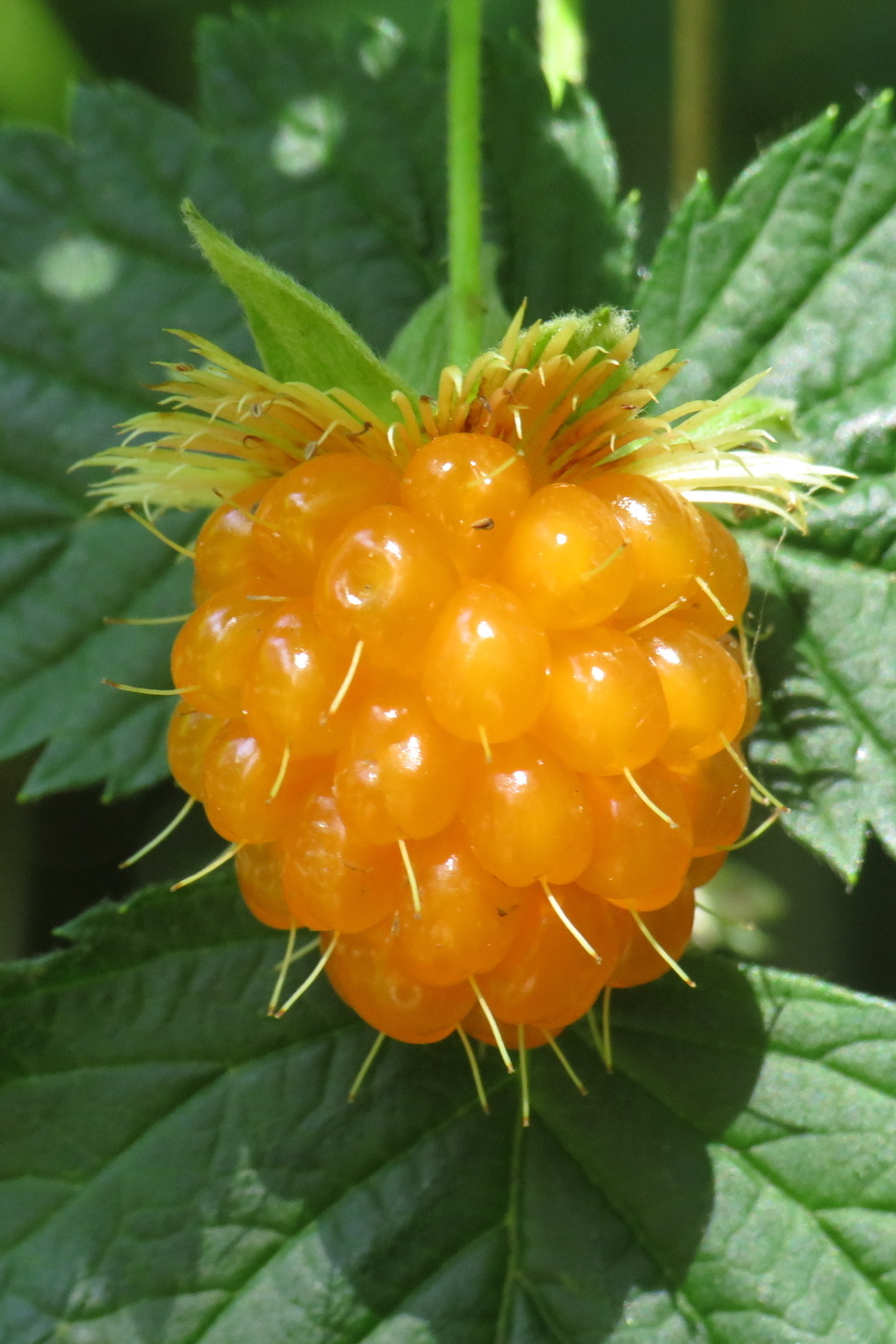
Yellow morph

Salmonberry fruits are polymorphic; different plants will produce berries that are either red in color or a yellow-orange color. Studies have found that although both red and yellow-orange morphs have similar physical qualities, the red berries are more commonly consumed by birds, although this is likely not a strong enough selective pressure to determine color morph distribution alone; factors such as soil type (which affects germination), along with other unstudied factors are more likely responsible for the color polymorphism. The orange morph is more common at lower latitudes such as Oregon, while the red morph is more common at higher latitudes. The yellow morph is more resistant to desiccation.

=== Similar species ===
A similar species from Japan, the red-flowered raspberry, was once considered a subspecies as R. spectabilis subsp. vernus, although it is now reclassified as a distinct species R. vernus.

== Habitat ==
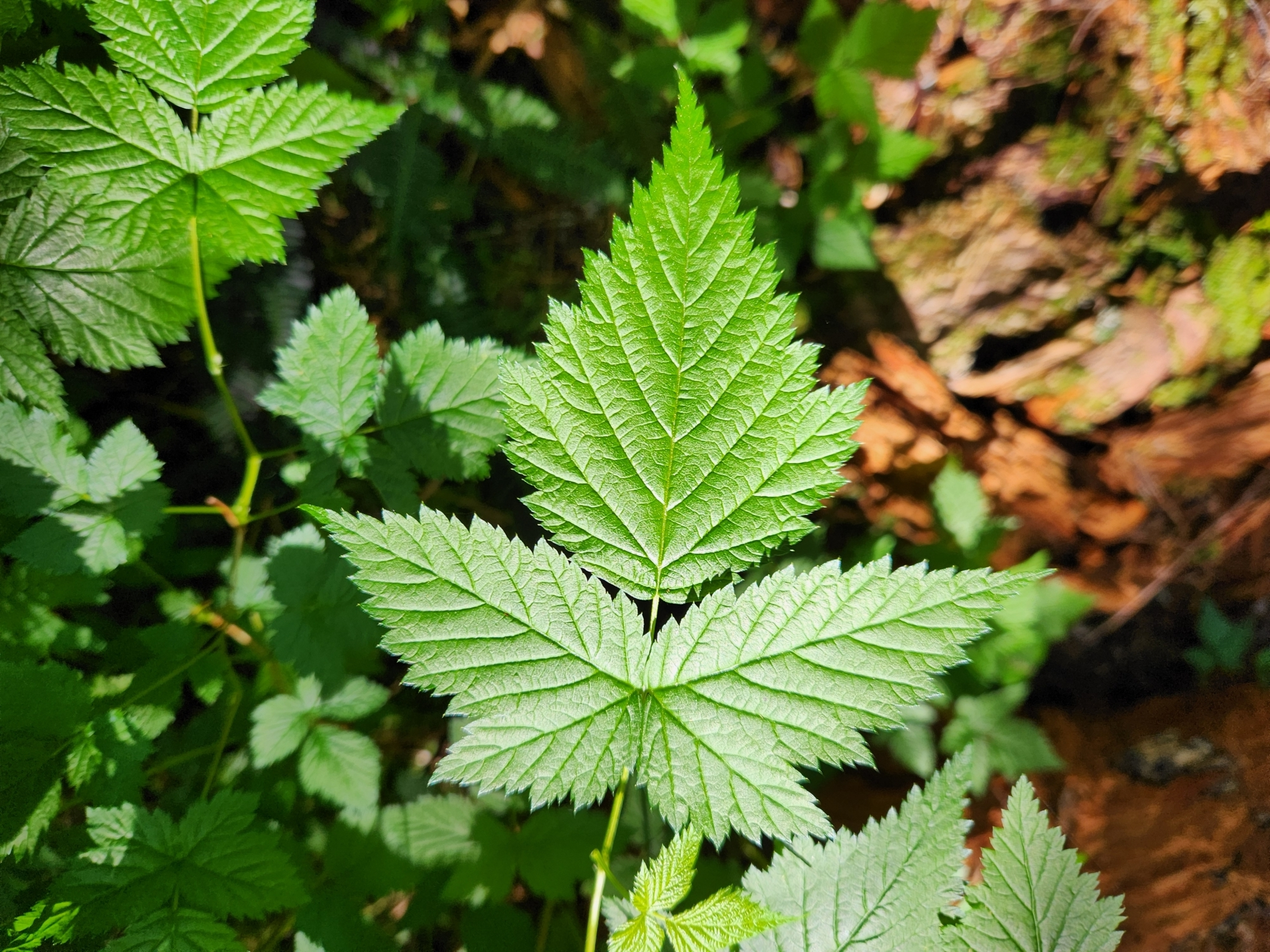
Leaves, in Washington

Salmonberries are typically found in coastal areas with nitrogen-rich soils, in moist to wet forests and streambanks, increasing in abundance in areas of high rainfall and decreasing in abundance at higher elevations and continentality. Ecologically speaking, salmonberry tends to spread quickly and needs plenty of room to grow, and is often dominant and fast-growing in early-seral communities. Its size and population growth decline in abundance as the canopy begins to form, and may also be influenced by other factors such as basal area, plant disturbance, and population density. In open areas they often form large thickets, and are found to associate with stands of red alder (Alnus rubra), lady fern (Athyrium filix-femina), western skunk cabbage (Lysichiton americanus), devil's club (Oplopanax horridus), thimbleberry (Rubus parviflorus), and threeleaf foamflower (Tiarella trifoliata).

== Ecology ==
In the wild, the fruit are typically eaten by birds, bears, and small mammals, among others, while the leaves, twigs, and stems are grazed on by herbivores such as deer, moose, mountain goats, elk, and rabbits. Populations of dense thicket growth can provide escape habitats for small animals, as well as nesting sites for birds.

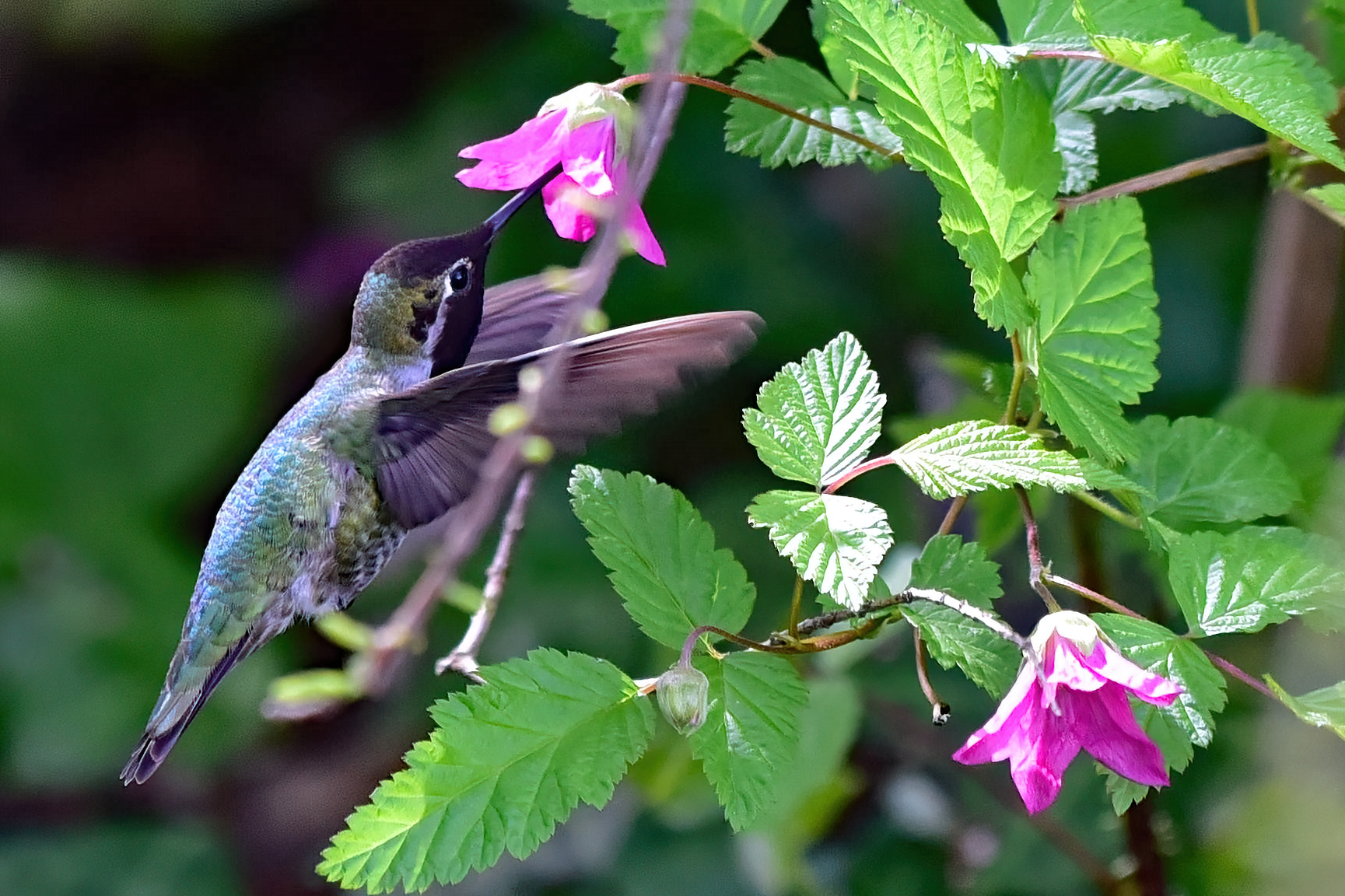
Anna's hummingbird feeding from salmonberry blossoms, in Vancouver

In the spring, salmonberry flowering coincides with the migration of certain species of hummingbirds, which is crucial for its pollination. Birds and mammals also help with dispersion of seeds through their feces, while rodents and other burrowing animals may further help with dispersion. Some notable mammals crucial for the dispersion of seeds are the grizzly and American black bears, which can deposit 50,000 to 100,000 seeds in one pile of feces.

Salmonberry have several traits that make it highly resistant to fire. Rhizomes and root crowns below the soil surface usually survive, even if top stems are burned. Depending on burial depth, seeds also often remain unharmed. Additionally, the plant tend to quickly sprout after fires, allowing for rapid growth and regeneration.

Salmonberries are susceptible to many diseases, including mildew, fruit rot, rust, root rot, and viral and bacterial diseases. Their fruits, foliage, canes, roots, and crowns may also be damaged by pests such as beetles, aphids, mites, moths, among others.

== Uses ==
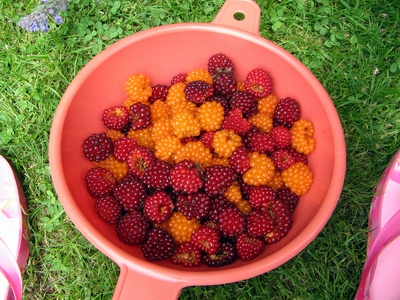
Colander of salmonberries

Salmonberries are edible plants. One field guide refers to the fruit as "diverse, from bright, fruity and citrusy to deep and earthy with spicy notes". Depending on ripeness and site, they are good eaten raw – whether red or golden – and processed into jam, candy, jelly and wine.

Native American people ate the young shoots or used it as a medicinal plant. The shoots were harvested during April to early June before they turned woody or tough, and were peeled, then steamed, boiled, or pit-cooked, and eaten (or less commonly, eaten raw). Traditionally, the berries and sprouts were also eaten with salmon or mixed with oolichan grease or salmon roe. They were not dried because of their high moisture content. It is still used as a food source and medicinal plant in regions of Alaska today.

Other uses by Native Americans include:

- Boiling the leaves with fish as a flavoring (by the Nuu-chah-nulth people)
- Using the leaves to line baskets, wipe fish, and cover cooking pits (by the Kaigani Haida people)
- Using the branches as a pipe stem (by the Makah people)
- Chewing and spitting the leaves (or bark in the winter) onto a burn as a treatment due to their astringent qualities (by the Quileute people)
- Boiling the bark in seawater to create a brew to clean infected wounds (especially burns) as well as reduce labor pains (by the Quinault people)

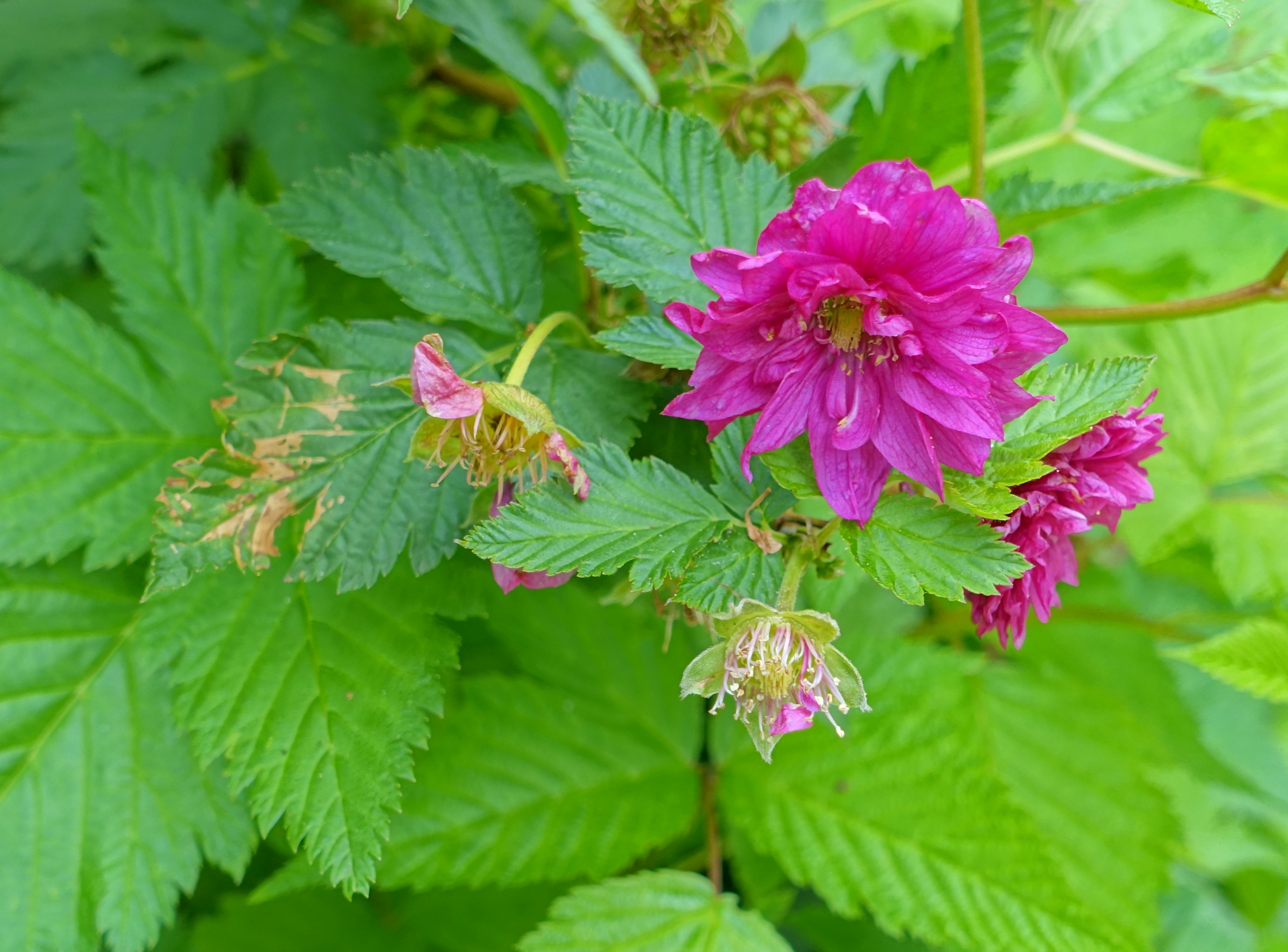
R. spectabilis 'Olympic Double', a double-flowered ornamental cultivar

It is also widely grown as an ornamental plant for its flowers, with a double-flowered clone identified in Washington and British Columbia. R. spectabilis has escaped cultivation and become naturalized in parts of northwestern Europe, including Great Britain, Ireland and the Faroe Islands.

== In culture ==
The salmonberry is important to multiple indigenous people of America in its native range. The Makah people call the plant ka'k'we'abupt and the berry ka'k'we; the Cowlitz people call the plant e'twanac and the berry e'twan; speakers of Lower Chinook call it yunts. The Squamish people call the plant yetwánáy and the berries yetwán, the shoots are called stsá7tskaý (pronounced saskay). In the Saanich dialect, it is called elile.

The birdsong of the Swainson's thrush, sometimes known as the salmonberry bird, is believed by some indigenous people of the Pacific Northwest Coast to cause the ripening of salmonberries, as is the case of the Saanich people who give the birdsong the onomatopoeic translation of "xwexwelexwelexwelexwesh!" meaning "ripen, ripen, ripen, ripen!" This belief is also widespread and is known to the Tlingit, Haida, Haisla, Oweekeno, Kwakwaka'wakw, Nuu-Chah-Nulth, Ditidaht, Sḵwx̱wú7mesh, and the Straits Salish people. The presence of Elasmostethus cruciatus, called the salmonberry bug, is also seen as an indicator to Northwest Coast indigenous peoples that salmonberry shoots are ready to harvest.
