= Nehalem River =

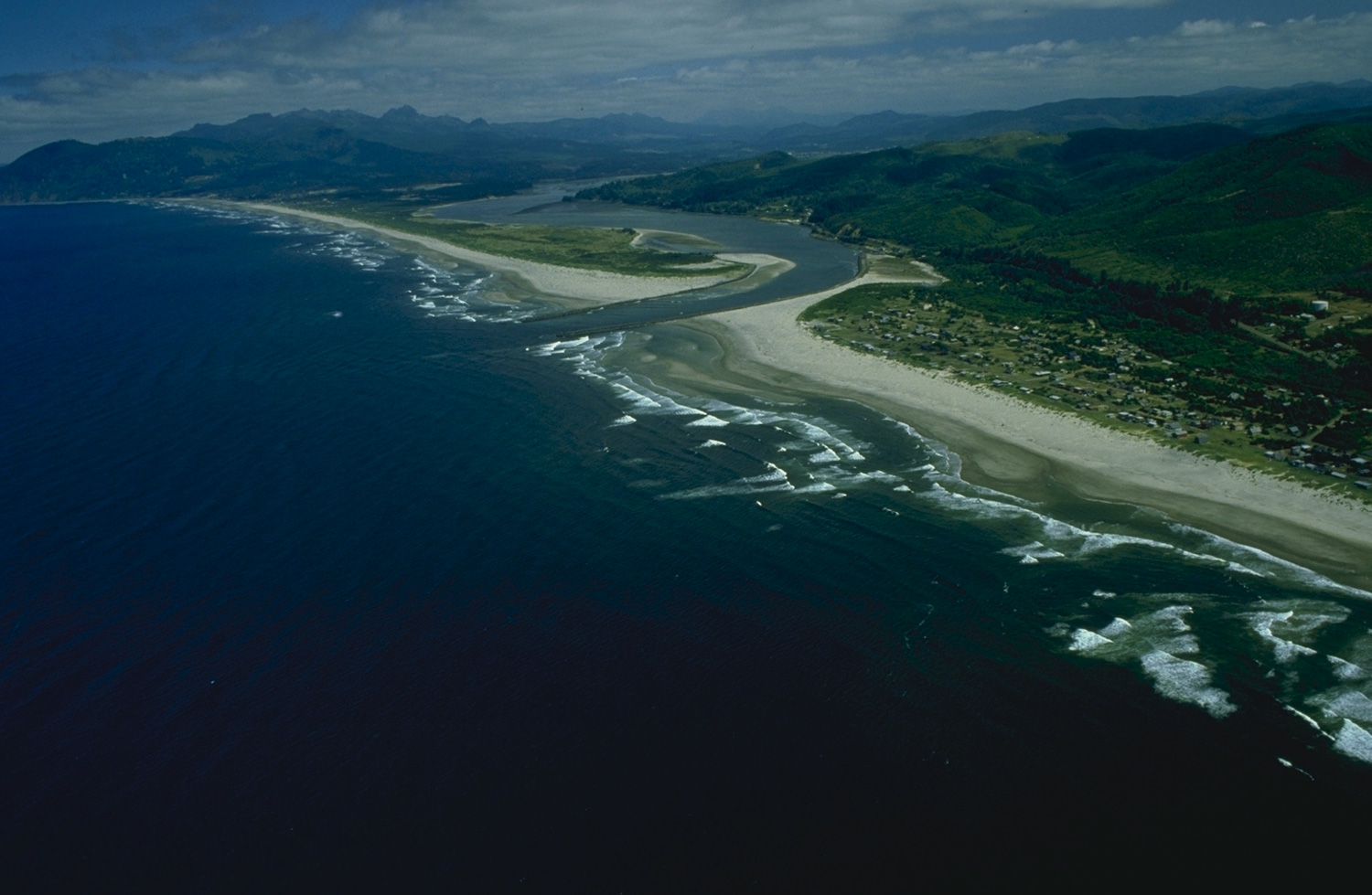
- Nehalem Bay at the mouth of the Nehalem River on the Pacific Ocean

- Location of the mouth of the Nehalem River in Oregon
- Etymology: Salish for "place where people live"

Location
- Country: United States
- State: Oregon
- County: Washington, Columbia, Clatsop, Tillamook

Physical characteristics
- Source: Northern Oregon Coast Range
  - location: Giveout Mountain, Tillamook County, Oregon
  - coordinates: 45°43′53″N 123°25′26″W
  - elevation: 2,424 ft (739 m)
- Mouth: Nehalem Bay
  - location: near Nehalem, Tillamook County, Oregon
  - coordinates: 45°39′29″N 123°56′04″W
  - elevation: 0 ft (0 m)
- Length: 118.5 mi (190.7 km)
- Basin size: 855 sq mi (2,210 km^{2})
- Discharge
  - location: near Foss, 13.5 miles (21.7 km) from mouth
  - average: 2,653 cu ft/s (75.1 m^{3}/s)
  - minimum: 34 cu ft/s (0.96 m^{3}/s)
  - maximum: 70,300 cu ft/s (1,990 m^{3}/s)

The Nehalem River is a river on the Pacific coast of northwest Oregon in the United States, approximately 119 miles (192 km) long. It drains part of the Northern Oregon Coast Range northwest of Portland, originating on the east side of the mountains and flowing in a loop around the north end of the range near the mouth of the Columbia River. Its watershed of 855 square miles (2,210 km^{2}) includes an important timber-producing region of Oregon that was the site of the Tillamook Burn. In its upper reaches it flows through a long narrow valley of small mountain communities but is unpopulated along most of its lower reaches inland from the coast.

It rises in the northeast corner of Tillamook County, in the Tillamook State Forest. It initially flows northeast, across the northwest corner of Washington County and into western Columbia County, past Vernonia where it receives Rock Creek, it hooks to the northwest and west into Clatsop County, then flows southwest back into northern Tillamook County. It enters Nehalem Bay on the Pacific in an estuary at Nehalem, about 70 miles (110 km) west-northwest of Portland. Near its mouth on the Pacific, the river passes under U.S. Route 101.

It receives the Salmonberry River from the east in northern Tillamook County. It also receives the North Fork Nehalem River 25 miles (40 km) from the north about 2 miles (3.2 km) northwest of Nehalem, just before entering Nehalem Bay.

In 2007, a major storm caused the Salmonberry Bridge (located at 45.7499°N 123.6528°W) to collapse. The bridge was rebuilt and opened to traffic on May 14, 2012.

Nehalem is also used as the codename for Intel's first-generation line of Core processors.

== See also ==
- List of rivers of Oregon
- List of longest streams of Oregon
