= Glenwood, Washington County, Oregon =

Unincorporated community in the state of Oregon, United States

Glenwood
- Unincorporated community
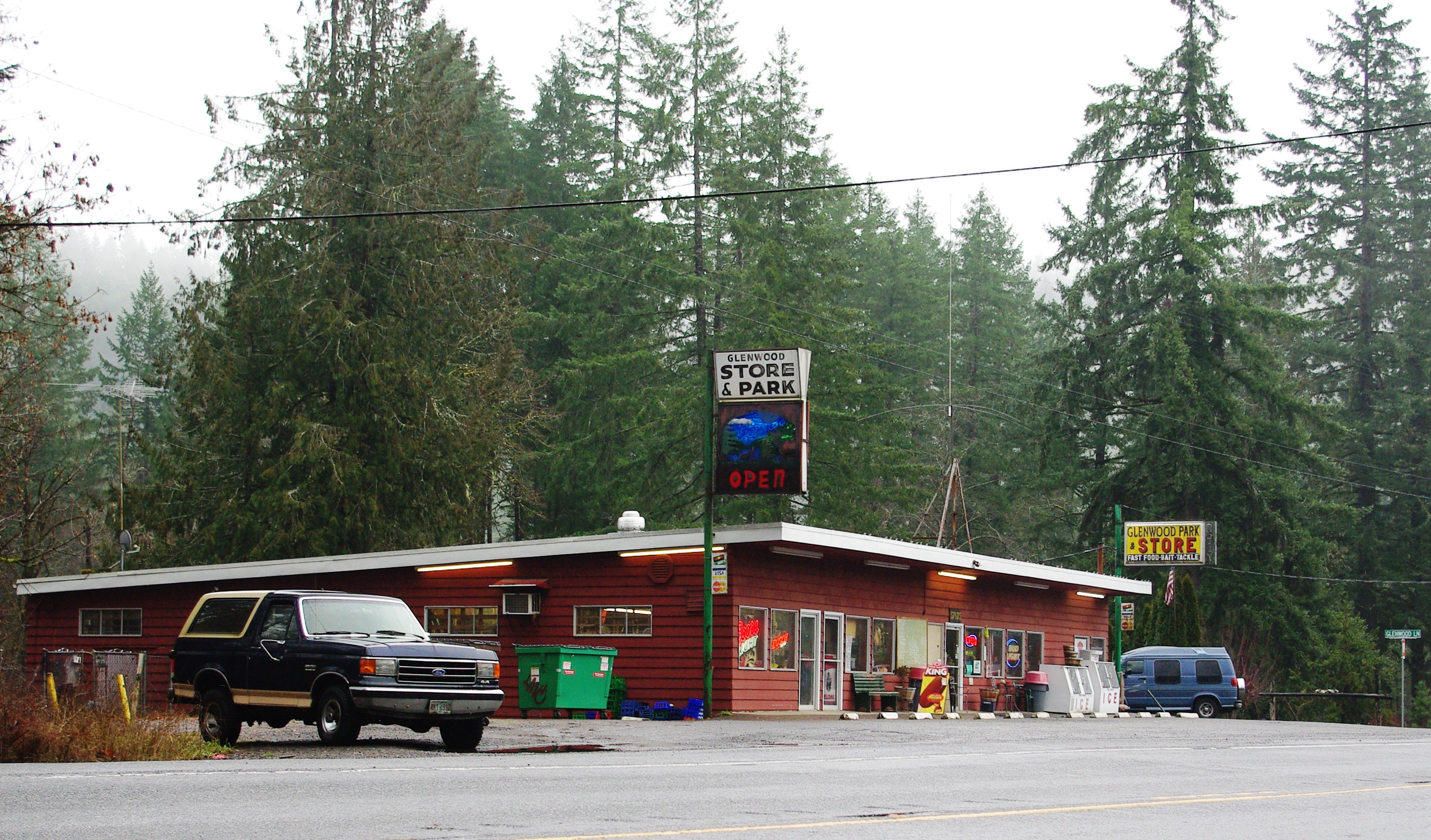
- Glenwood Store on Oregon Route 6

- Location within the state of Oregon Glenwood (the United States)
- Coordinates: 45°38′57″N 123°16′15″W
- Country: United States
- State: Oregon
- County: Washington
- Time zone: UTC-8 (Pacific (PST))
  - Summer (DST): UTC-7 (PDT)
- ZIP code: 97116
- Area codes: 503 and 971

Glenwood is an unincorporated community in Washington County, Oregon, United States. It is located northwest of Forest Grove on Oregon Route 6 along Gales Creek.

The name Glenwood was first used for this locale around 1880. The post office was established in 1886 as "Glenwood", although it was not always in the same location. In the 1920s, the Gales Creek and Wilson River Railroad had a terminal station nearby named "Aagaard" (or "Aagard") after Olaf B. Aagaard, owner of the Aagaard Lumber Company. The Gales Creek Logging Company also operated a site at or near this original mill. The name of the station was soon changed to Glenwood to match the post office.

Multiple lumber companies operated in this area and one of these operations is thought to have been a possible cause of the start of the first Tillamook Burn fires. During the salvaging effort some of these companies joined together to form the Consolidated Timber Company, which helped provide lumber during World War II and provided employment for those willing to dare the dangerous conditions often employing gyppo loggers.

From 1959 until 1995, the community was the site of the Trolley Park museum, later renamed the Oregon Electric Railway Museum, which is now part of Antique Powerland in Brooks.

Glenwood has a Forest Grove mailing address, but the Postal Service will deliver mail addressed to Glenwood. The ZIP code is 97116.

The Glenwood Store has been owned by various owners over the years. It was remodeled and reopened fairly recently (as of June 2022.) It is the last store before the long road to Tillamook. The junction of where it is located has a bridge that connects to the Glenwood Park neighborhood. There is also an old park, along Gales Creek by the store, that used to be along the old wagon road before the highway was put in. There used to be cabins there, however there are no longer any signs of their presence. This area is private and owned by the Glenwood store.

Gales Creek Camp, for Children with Type 1 Diabetes, is located on the west side of town.

South of the Glenwood Store is a locally owned Mediterranean influenced Restaurant with catering and a brewery. This used to be the location of the "Fernwood" or "Firwood" store. There was also a small town called "Fir" here with a temporary post office.
