= Oregon Route 131 =

State highway in Tillamook County, Oregon, US

Oregon Route 131
- Route 131 highlighted in red

Route information
- Maintained by ODOT
- Length: 9.08 mi (14.61 km)
- Existed: September 19, 2002–present
- Tourist routes: Three Capes Scenic Route

Major junctions
- West end: Maxwell Avenue in Oceanside
- East end: US 101 / OR 6 in Tillamook

Location
- Country: United States
- State: Oregon
- County: Tillamook

Highway system
- Oregon Highways; Interstate; US; State; Named; Scenic
| ← OR 130 | → OR 138 |

Oregon Route 131 (OR 131), known as the Netarts Highway No. 131 (see Oregon highways and routes), is a state highway in the U.S. state of Oregon. The route runs from the coastal community of Oceanside to an intersection with U.S. Route 101 (US 101) and OR 6 in Tillamook, Oregon. The highway is 9.02 miles (14.52 km) long. Netarts Highway No. 131 was established in 1940, and was designated OR 131 in 2002.

== Route description ==
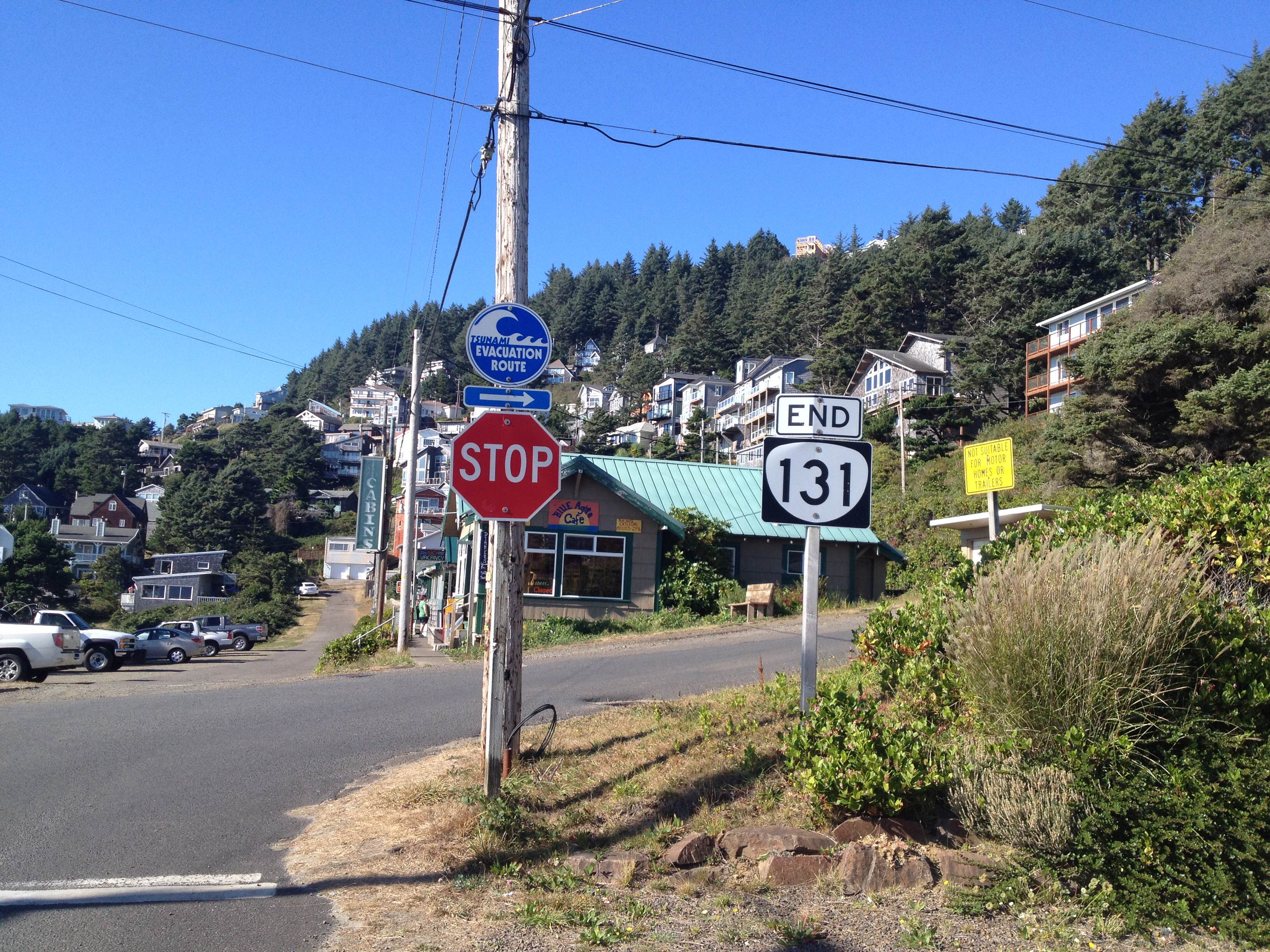
OR 131's western terminus in the town of Oceanside.

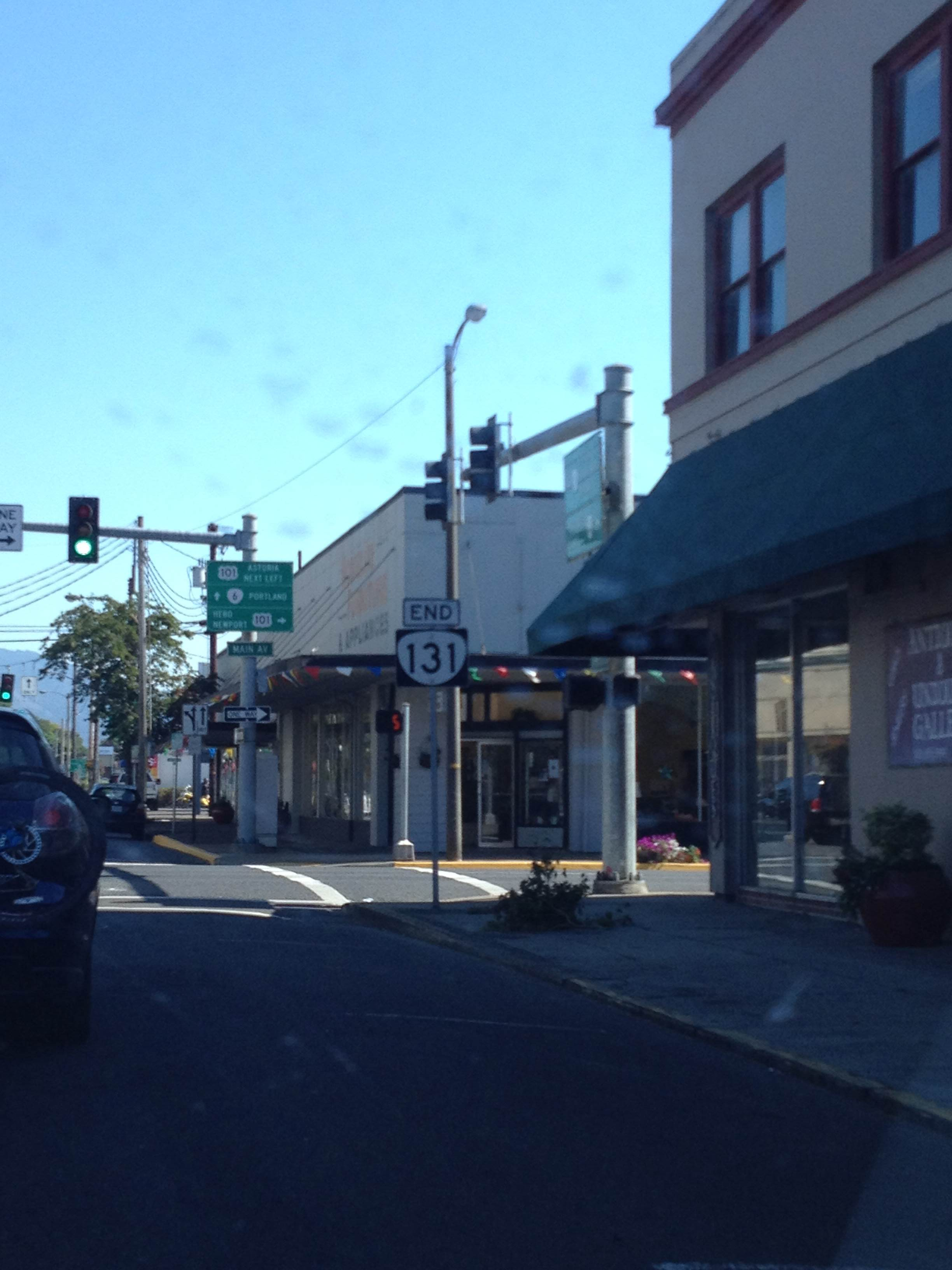
The eastern terminus of OR 131 in Tillamook at US 101 and OR 6.

The western terminus of OR 131 is in the town of Oceanside, located in between Cape Meares and Cape Lookout in Tillamook County. From there, the highway heads south through Netarts, and then heads east. The highway then turns north, finally turning east before it ends in downtown Tillamook, at an intersection with US 101 and OR 6.

The stretch of the highway between Oceanside, and an intersection south of Netarts, is part of the Three Capes Scenic Route, as is the easternmost stretch of the highway approaching Tillamook.

== History ==
The Netarts Highway No. 131 was established as a secondary highway on November 13, 1940. On September 19, 2002, OR 131 was assigned to the Netarts Highway.

== Major intersections ==
The entire route is in Tillamook County.

| Location | mi | km | Destinations | Notes |
|---|---|---|---|---|
| Oceanside | 0.00 | 0.00 | Maxwell Avenue | |
| Tillamook | 9.08 | 14.61 | US 101 – Astoria, Seaside, Rockaway Beach, Hebo, Newport OR 6 east – Portland, Forest Grove, Gales Creek, Timber | |
1.000 mi = 1.609 km; 1.000 km = 0.621 mi
