= Consolidated Timber Company =

Defunct American lumber company

- Formation: 1936
- Dissolved: 1946
- Purpose: Salvage operations
- Location: Glenwood, Oregon, U.S.
- Products: Lumber
- Board Chair: John W. Blodgett Jr.
- Key people: Lloyd Crosby
- Formerly called: Tillamook Salvage Pool

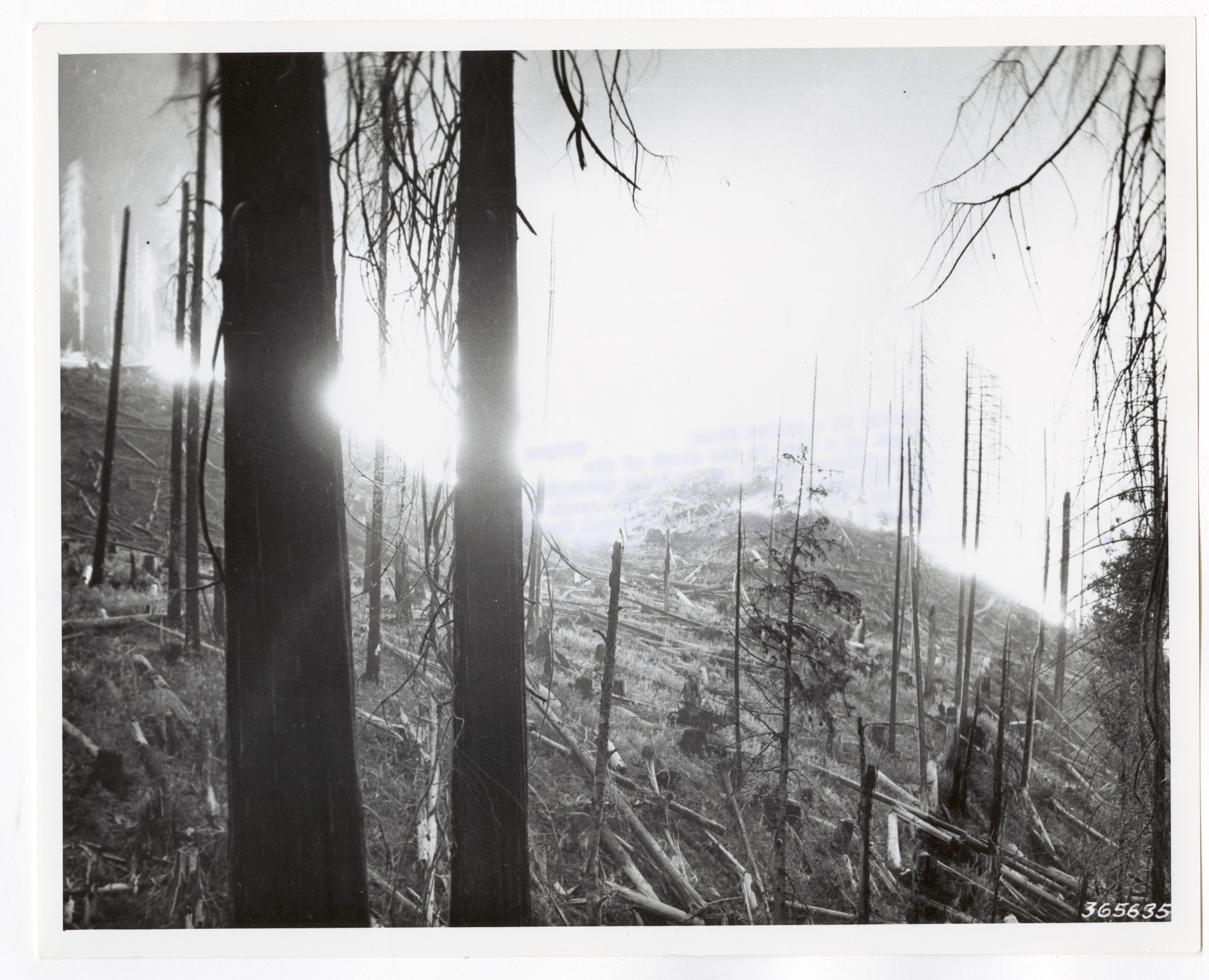
Night fire in the slash on the Consolidated Timber Company salvage operation

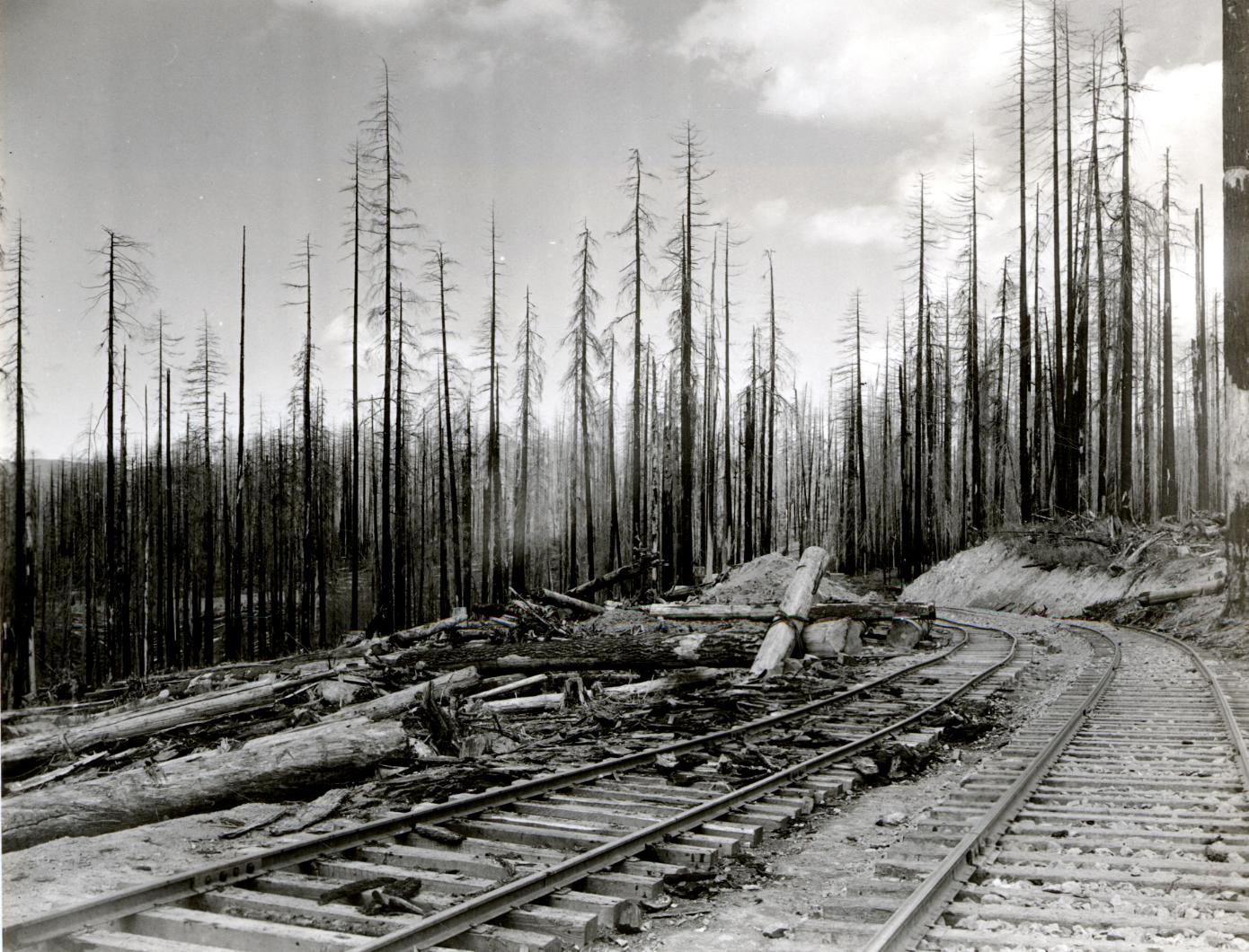
Fire-killed Douglas-fir along the Consolidated Timber Company Railroad

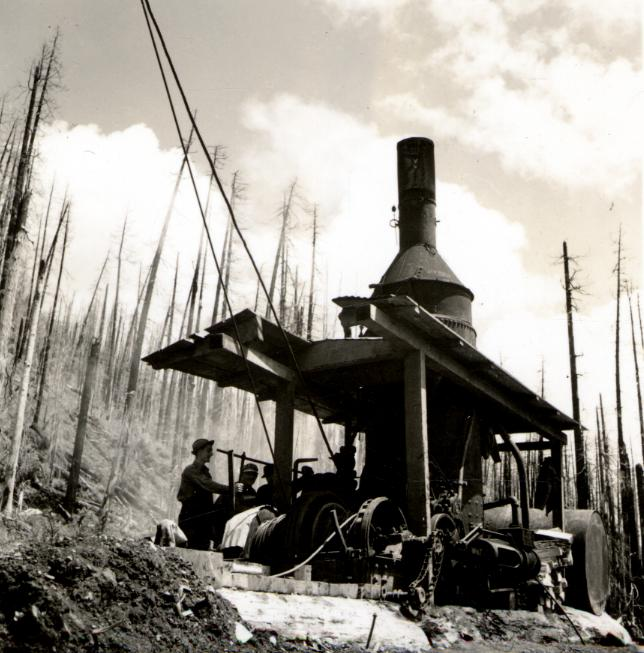
Logging donkey working on the Consolidated Timber Company tract

Consolidated Timber Company was an American lumber company that operated a large sawmill near Glenwood, Oregon, circa 1936–1946.

== History ==
The Consolidated Timber Company was formed in response to the need to salvage the massive amount of lumber remaining after the initial Tillamook Burn fire in 1933. This would eventually end up being the largest salvage operation in American history. The original large fire was thought to have been caused by the operation of one of the original smaller companies that were located here. Access to the woods was difficult at the time as the original Astoria Military road had gone unmaintained and the Wilson River Highway had not been constructed yet. The original Wilson River road had fallen into disuse due to collapsed bridges and lack of funding. The Gales Creek and Wilson River Railroad (GCWRR) provided an ideal way to transport the material from the woods.

The site was located on land originally owned by J.L. Washburn as early as 1909. He had hoped to build railroads into the woods to harvest the lumber, however, he ran short of funds. He sold the land the camp was to be built on to American Lumber and Timber Co in Aug 1911 for $30,000. He was the primary shareholder of the Gales Creek and Wilson River Railroad company and in 1922 he ended up selling all of his stocks at a loss of $112,699. He contended that he was not involved in the railroad business as was merely a dealer of securities.

In 1917 the Gales Creek and Wilson River Railroad company was formed and in 1919 a line was created from Wilkesboro to Glenwood. It was placed into operation in 1920 however it only ran as far as the location of the current Children's Diabetic Camp. There were plans to have the line extend to Tillamook however they never panned out.

Multiple smaller fires occurred in the area throughout 1920–1930. In 1932 a large fire burned in the nearby Salmonberry River valley.

Aagaard Lumber Company operated here from as early as 1919. It processed around 60,000 board ft. daily and may have expanded with more mills. It operated until around 1922 when it was acquired by Big Creek Logging Company a subsidiary of Crossett-Western Lumber Co, which then formed the Gales Creek Logging Company. Operations started here on March 1, 1923. They employed about 200 men and the expected output was around 250,000 board ft. daily.

Soon after the first burn, a lawyer and businessman named William Charles Slattery with interests in the timber industry, came to Portland and organized The Consolidated Timber Company. Henry F. Cheney, The Blodgett Company, Crossett-Western, and various other timber companies joined operations and built a large logging camp at the site. Over $4 million was invested in the site and equipment. The railroad line was extended to the mill and beyond along the north side of Gales Creek. From here the track continued up to the summit to what was known as Owl Camp near present-day Rogers Camp. The line split here and continued north and south to various logging sites. Around 1936 the government provided federal aid as part of Roosevelt's "New Deal" for the construction of the Wilson River Highway in the hopes it would assist with firefighting and logging operations.

The main camp had an extensive layout with at least two large mills. It also featured a main office, kitchen, dining hall, water tower, telegraph line and multiple workers' buildings. A dam was constructed on Gales creek at this area as well. Many of the camp buildings were transported in on railroad cars. The logging methods at the time were much more dangerous and primitive and included the use of spar poles and steam donkeys.

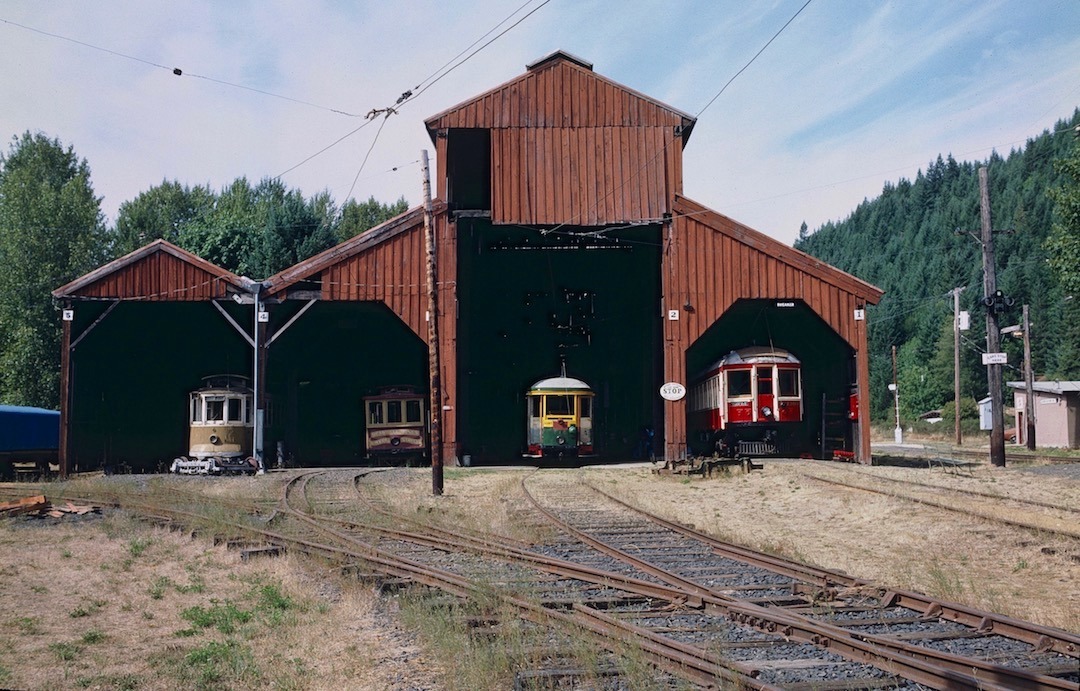
Car barn at the Trolley Park museum

Access to the site was improved with the completion of the Wilson River highway in 1941. In 1943 a celebration was held at the camp due to it being awarded the Army-Navy "E" award for its role in production efforts used towards the war. Operations at the camp continued until 1946. The camp was dismantled and equipment removed, however many of the buildings were left intact. The site was later turned into a trolley museum and park known as "Trolley Park" and operated from 1959 to 1995. The organization provided trolley rides around a loop of track and had a stop named "The Meadows" with a picnic area along the creek. It then closed and was eventually moved to Brooks, Oregon and renamed the Oregon Electric Railway Museum. The railroad tracks at the location were eventually removed and the site was sold to a private landowner. Small remnants of the camp can be seen from the highway and throughout the area including the old railroad grades and a few trestles, however, the road leading to the site of the original camp is private and can only accessed with permission.
