= Short Beach (Oregon) =

Beach in Oregon, United States

- Beach
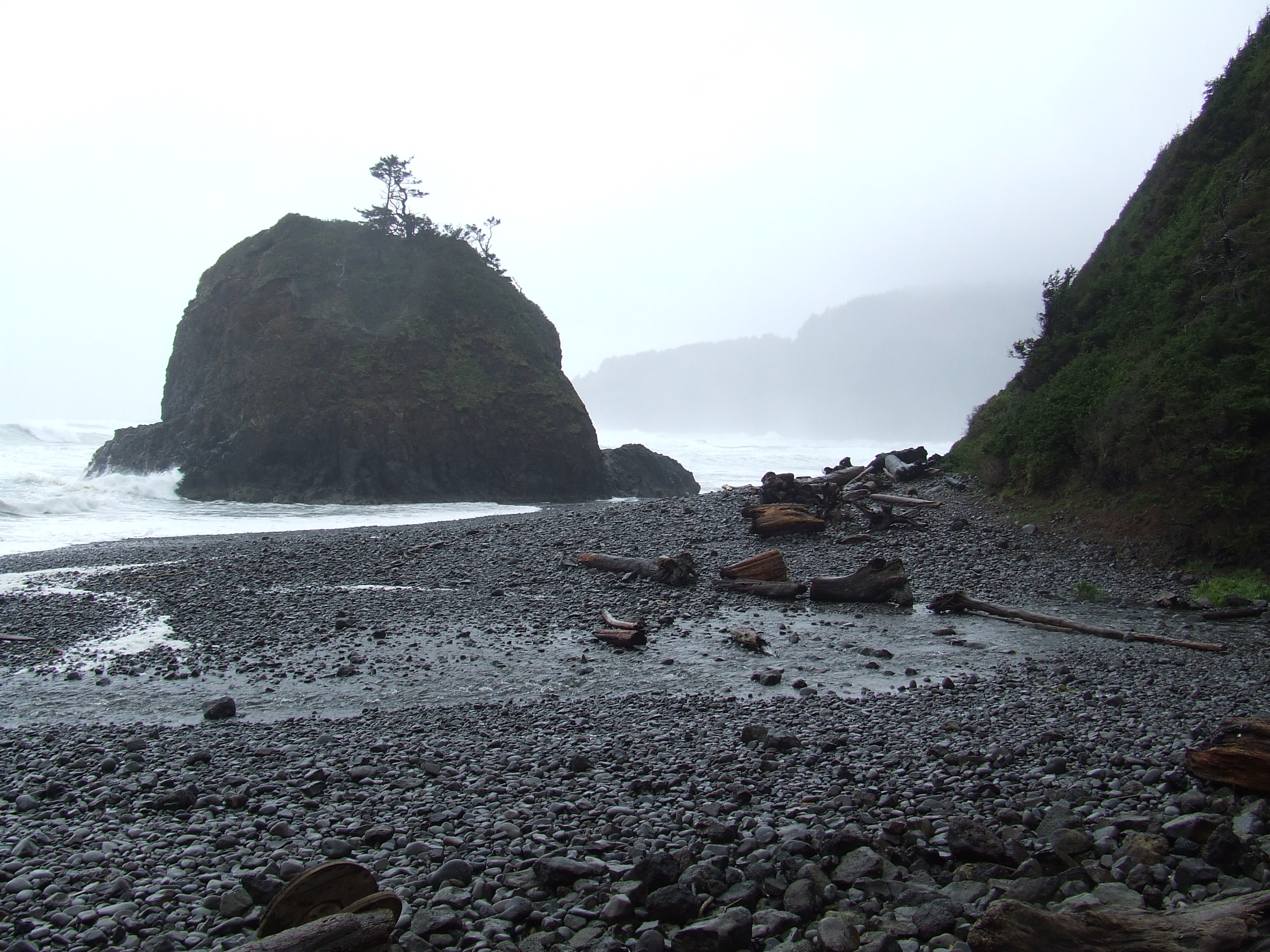
- Short Beach, Tillamook County, Oregon

- Location within Oregon Location within the United States
- Coordinates: 45°28′30″N 123°58′02″W
- Part of: Oregon Coast
- Geology: Beach

Dimensions
  - Length: 1,000 m (3,300 ft)

Short Beach is a 1,000-meter stretch of beach on the northern Oregon Coast in the United States. Locals guess that both the beach and the creek that runs onto it—Short Creek, several miles in length—were named after an early resident of the area. Just south of Cape Meares State Park, and a bit north of Oceanside, the beach is hidden from the land except for a brief stretch of road which crosses the dam across Short Creek.

The seasonal Short Beach

Other attractions are the mussels, which can be gathered from offshore rocks at low tides, surf fishing, and beach fires. An occasional surfer may be seen, as well as paragliders who, now that there is safe access, sometimes land on the beach.

Offshore, and partly onshore, are a number of rocks belonging to the Oregon Islands National Wildlife Refuge. In recent years, both these and the higher land around Short Beach have suffered significant erosion — collapse of rock faces and shoreward erosion along the bluff of over five feet in the last decade.

The sand level has been dropping steadily ever since the first dams went up on the Columbia River and other area rivers, and continues to drop, leading to a local joke that "Short Beach" means it is getting very short on beach.

== See also ==
- List of National Wildlife Refuges
