= Octopus tree =

Octopus tree may refer to:

- Didierea madagascariensis, a densely spiny succulent plant in the family Didiereaceae
- Heptapleurum actinophyllum, an evergreen tree with compound leaves in the family Araliaceae
- Octopus Tree (Oregon), an individual Sitka spruce tree

== See also ==
- Pacific Northwest tree octopus
