= Oceanside Beach State Recreation Site =

State park in Oregon, United States

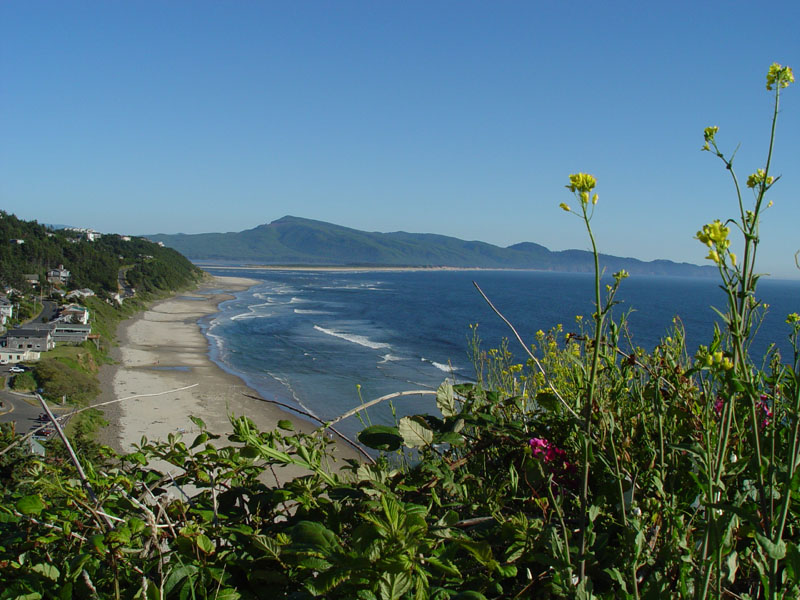
- Beach at Oceanside, Oregon

- Location within Oregon Location within the United States
- Type: Public, state
- Location: Tillamook County, Oregon
- Nearest city: Oceanside
- Coordinates: 45°27′39″N 123°58′15″W
- Area: 7.3 acres (3.0 ha)
- Operator: Oregon Parks and Recreation Department
- Status: Day use, open year-round

Oceanside Beach State Recreation Site is a state park in the U.S. state of Oregon. Administered by the Oregon Parks and Recreation Department, the park is open to the public and is fee-free. Amenities at the site, in the unincorporated community of Oceanside, include picnicking, wildlife watching, fishing, windsurfing, and kite flying. It is not uncommon to see paraglider pilots land at the beach on Southwest wind days during the fall, winter and spring. Beachcombing is popular in summer, and agate hunting is best in winter, when ocean currents remove sand. Oceanside is about 11 miles (18 km) west of Tillamook off U.S. Route 101.

The 7.3-acre (3.0 ha) site lies between the Pacific Ocean to the west and homes on a steep slope to the east. Cape Meares is to the north and Netarts Bay and Cape Lookout are to the south. About 0.5 miles (0.8 km) offshore is Three Arch Rocks, part of the Oregon Islands National Wildlife Refuge. It supports breeding colonies of tufted puffins and common murres as well as pigeon guillemots, storm-petrels, cormorants, and other birds. The refuge is also a breeding site for Steller sea lions. From Oceanside Beach, visitors can walk north through a man-made tunnel in Maxwell Point to see Tunnel Beach.

== See also ==
- List of Oregon state parks
