= Oregon Route 6 =

Highway in Oregon

Oregon Route 6
- Route 6 highlighted in red

Route information
- Maintained by ODOT
- Length: 51.25 mi (82.48 km)
- Existed: 1942 (Rerouted 1957)–present
- Component highways: Wilson River Highway No. 37

Major junctions
- West end: US 101 / OR 131 in Tillamook
- OR 47 near Banks
- East end: US 26 near Banks

Location
- Country: United States
- State: Oregon
- Counties: Tillamook, Washington

Highway system
- Oregon Highways; Interstate; US; State; Named; Scenic
← I-5	→ OR 7

Oregon Route 6 is a state highway in the U.S. state of Oregon that runs between the city of Tillamook on the Oregon Coast, to the Willamette Valley, near Banks. OR 6 traverses the Wilson River Highway No. 37 of the Oregon state highway system, named after the river paralleling the highway's western segment.

== Route description ==
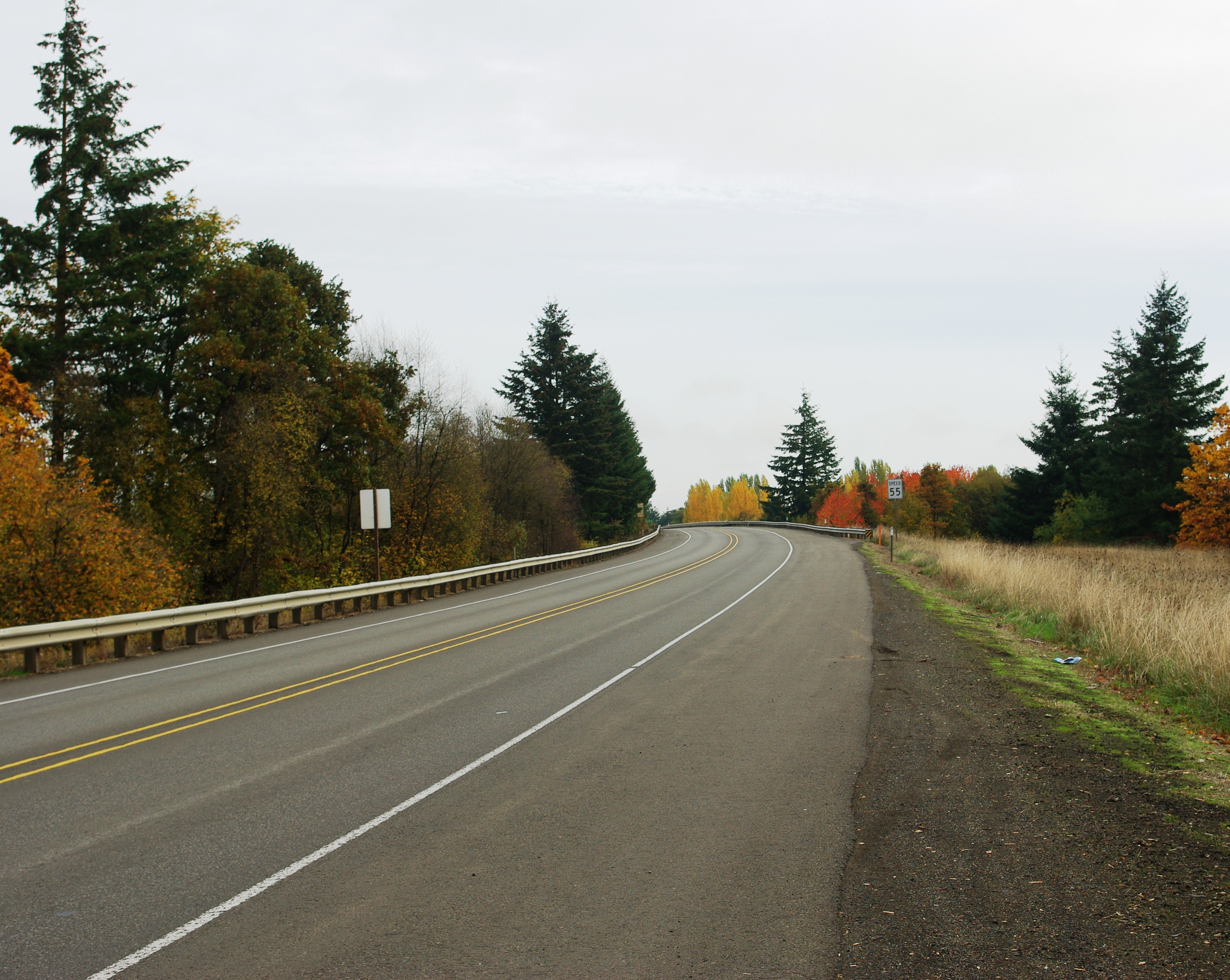
The highway near Banks looking east towards Portland

OR 6 begins (at its western terminus) at a junction with U.S. Route 101 and Oregon Route 131 in downtown Tillamook. From there it winds eastward though the Northern Oregon Coast Range along the Wilson River, and through a portion of the Tillamook State Forest. The stretch through the Coast Range is well known for its scenic beauty (as well as frequent accidents; the highway is a highly traveled route despite numerous twists and turns and steep grades). Emerging from the Coast Range, it passes through a few foothill communities. At the base of the Coast Range, Oregon Route 8 forks off to the east, heading towards the communities of Gales Creek and Forest Grove; whereas OR 6 continues to the northeast. OR 6 soon passes south of the city of Banks, where it has an interchange with the Nehalem Highway (OR 47), and Wilkesboro. A few miles east of Banks, OR 6 ends at an interchange with U.S. Route 26, the Sunset Highway. Travelers generally continue east on US 26 (which is a freeway east of the interchange) into Portland.

OR 6 passes through some of the areas devastated during the Tillamook Burn, a series of fires that occurred in the 1930s, 1940s, and early 1950s in eastern Tillamook County.

== History ==
During the Great Depression, workers from the Works Progress Administration assisted in the construction of the road. Before 1957, OR 6 included the entirety of today's Oregon Route 8, plus an additional stretch into downtown Portland. With the completion of the Sunset Highway (and the new alignment through Banks), the route through Gales Creek and the Tualatin Valley was renumbered as OR 8; and OR 6 was placed on the alignment it has today.

The section from Glenwood east to the US 26 junction was a former and temporary routing of US 26, continuing north through Timber. This routing was used by US 26 while the final stretch was completed.

In 2022, the state legislature passed a law that requires the Oregon Department of Transportation to conduct a survey of the highway to reduce hazardous road designs. This came in response to seven fatalities in the previous year and other collisions, many of which involved "lane departures".

== Major intersections ==
Milepoints are as reported by ODOT and do not necessarily reflect current mileage. Z indicates overlapping mileage due to construction longer than established route, and – indicates negative mileage behind established beginning point. Segments that are locally maintained may be omitted. For routes traversing multiple named state highways, each milepoint is preceded by the corresponding state highway number.

County	Location	Milepoint	Destinations	Notes
Tillamook	Tillamook	0.00	US 101 north – Bay City, Astoria US 101 south – Hebo, Newport OR 131 west – Netarts, Oceanside, Cape Lookout State Park, Cape Meares	
Tillamook		32.85	Summit, elevation 1,586 feet (483 m)	
Washington	Gales Creek	38.87	Timber Road (north) – Gales Creek, Timber	Leads to – north of Timber.
Washington		42.28	OR 8 east (Gales Creek Road) – Forest Grove	
Washington		49.09	OR 47 – Banks, Forest Grove	
Washington		51.62	US 26 – North Plains, Portland	Interchange
1.000 mi = 1.609 km; 1.000 km = 0.621 mi: Incomplete access

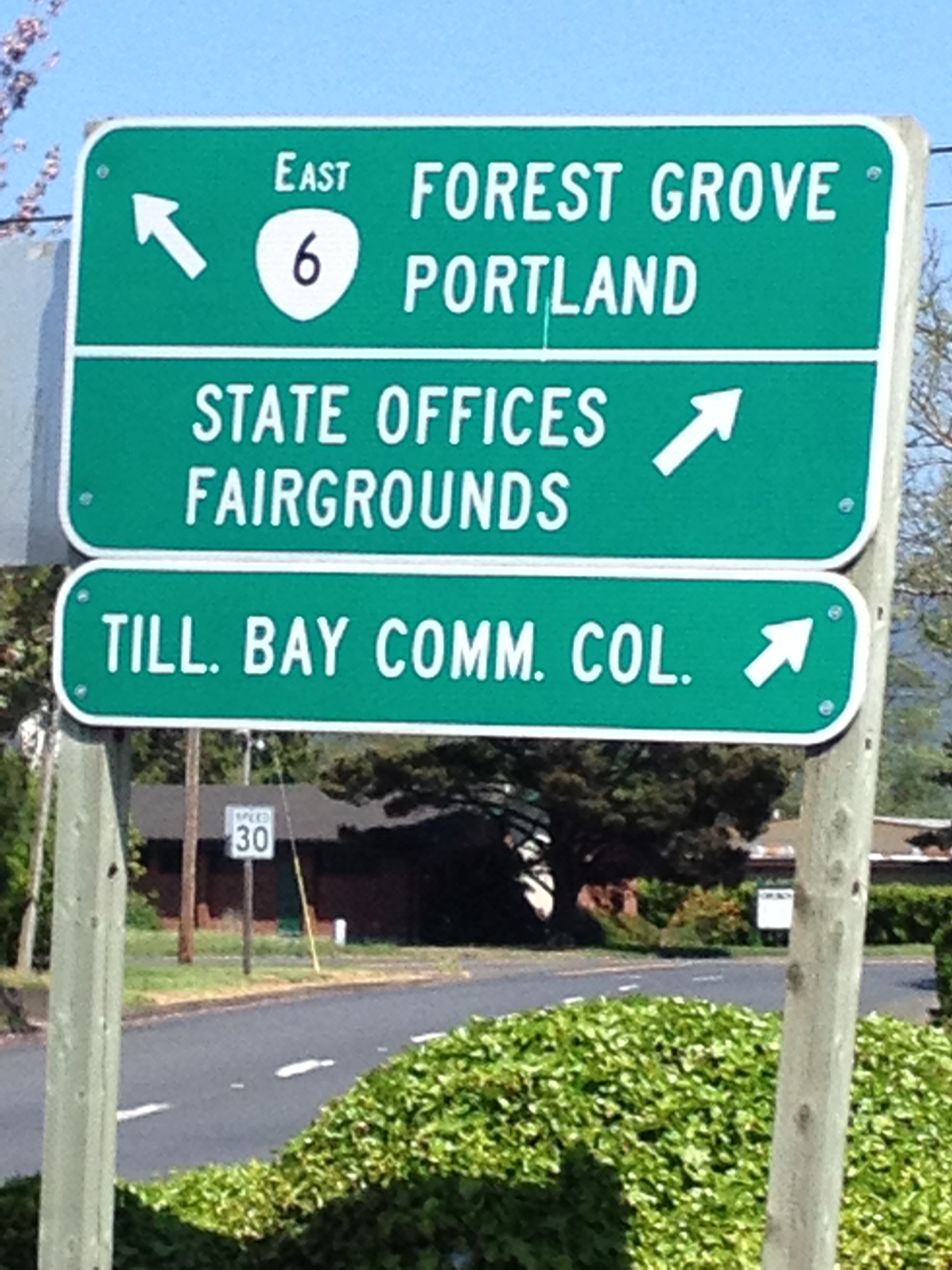
Start of Oregon Route 6 at Tillamook.
