= Tillamook Burn =

Series of forest fires in the Northern Oregon Coast Range

Coordinates: 45.54°N 123.29°W

The Tillamook Burn was a series of forest fires in the Northern Oregon Coast Range of Oregon in the United States that destroyed a total area of 350,000 acres (140,000 hectares) of old growth forest in what is now known as the Tillamook State Forest. There were four wildfires in this series, which spanned the years of 1933–1958. By association, the name Tillamook Burn also refers to the location of these fires. This event is an important part of Oregon's history.

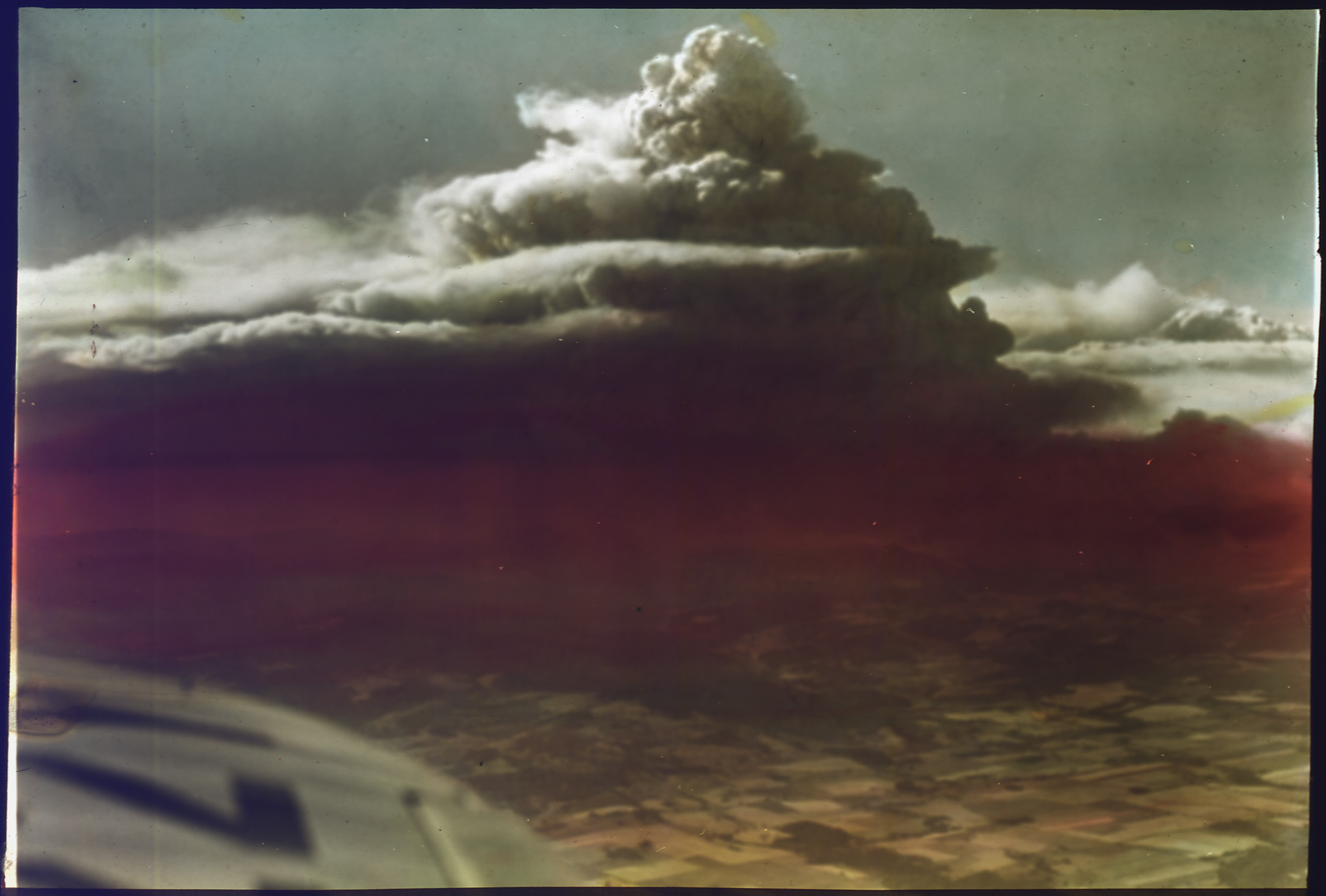
Aerial view of one of the fires in August 1933

== First fire (1933) ==
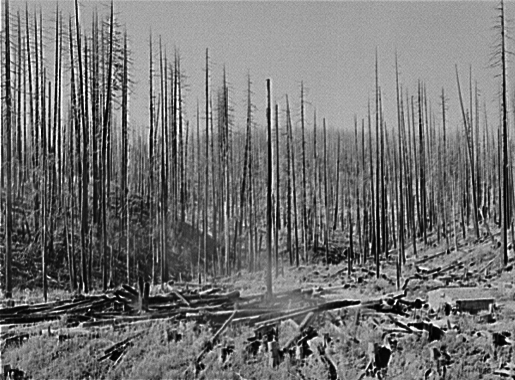
The Tillamook burn photographed in 1941

The first fire started in a ravine at the headwaters of Gales Creek on August 14, 1933. The exact cause of the first fire is unknown; however, the common narrative states that as logging crews were wrapping up operations early due to fire hazard restrictions, a steel cable dragging a fallen Douglas fir rubbed against the dry bark of a wind-fallen snag. (While the "common narrative" claims that two large trees were rubbed together, thus causing ignition, it is more likely that hot embers escaped from the firebox on the steam donkey and ignited nearby combustibles.) The snag burst into flame, and the wildfire that grew out of this burned 350,000 acres (140,000 ha) before it was extinguished by seasonal rains on September 5. An oppressive, acrid smoke filled the neighboring valleys; ashes, and cinders, and the charred needles of trees fell in the streets of Tillamook; and debris from the fire reached ships 500 miles (800 km) at sea. A Civilian Conservation Corps member was the only known human casualty of fighting the fire. The loss in processed lumber was estimated to have been $442.4 million in contemporary (1933) dollars—a serious loss not only to the timber industry at the time, but also to a nation struggling with the Great Depression. A massive salvage operation was immediately begun to harvest usable portions of the burned wilderness.

The speed with which a forest fire can spread given abundant fuel under the most favorable conditions is well illustrated by this fire. From August 14 at 1 p.m. until the early morning of August 24 the fire had burned about 40,320 acres (16,320 ha) and it appeared that it might be brought under control soon. Thus, for over 10 days it had burned at an average rate of about 3,840 acres (1,550 ha) a day. On August 24, the humidity dropped rapidly to 26 percent and hot gale-force winds from the east sprang up. During the next 20 hours of August 24 and 25 the fire burned over an additional 268,800 acres (108,800 ha), or at a rate of 13,440 acres (5,440 ha) per hour along a 15-mile (24 km) front. The fire was stopped only by the fact that the wind ceased and a thick, wet blanket of fog drifted in from the ocean.

== Second fire (1939) ==
The second fire was started in 1939, allegedly by another logging operation. It burned 190,000 acres (77,000 ha) before being extinguished.

== Third fire (1945) ==
A third fire started on the morning of July 9, 1945, near the Salmonberry River, and was joined two days later by a second blaze on the Wilson River, started by a discarded cigarette. This fire burned 180,000 acres (73,000 ha) before it was put out. The cause of the blaze on the Salmonberry River was mysterious, and many believed it had been set by an incendiary balloon launched by the Japanese (due to the fire occurring in the waning days of World War II), which had been carried to Oregon by the jet stream.

The third fire was perhaps the best known, after the initial wildfire, because it affected much of the forested mountains along the popular highways between Portland and the recreational destinations of the ocean beaches. This devastation remained visible to any traveler through the area as late as the mid-1970s.

== Fourth fire (1951) ==
The last fire started in 1951, and burned only 32,000 acres (13,000 ha).

== Salvage operations ==
Immediately after the first fire, new logging camps formed and existing ones expanded operations. At the time, access to the forest was limited and the railroad lines did not yet extend into the inner reaches of the forest.

The town of Timber expanded during the time and became a prominent logging town along with the smaller town of Cochran to the west. Some of the logging companies near Glenwood joined their operations to form the Consolidated Timber Company. The lumber from these operations played an important part in providing wood resources to the United States during World War II.

Throughout the subsequent years, miles of roads and railroad lines and were built through the forest to the various logging camps providing enhanced access. This made it easier for forestry restoration, maintenance, and fire prevention operations allowing them to eventually get a handle on the continued series of burns, though it also created new issues with erosion in a terrain known for landslides.

== Restoration ==
The repeated fires led some to think that large wildfires in the area were inevitable and that the land was now too damaged from the intense heat to ever again sustain forests. But determined efforts by Oregonians—private citizens, government officials, land owners and many others—resulted in efforts to restore The Burn, beginning with hearings during World War II under Judge H. D. Kerkman of Washington County and eventually resulting in a decades-long reforestation program. Much of the lands of the Tillamook burn had come to be owned by the counties of Tillamook, Yamhill, and Washington through foreclosures on unpaid property taxes; at the time of the forest fires, most of the land was owned by timber companies, which also paid the cost of fighting the fires. A measure was submitted by the Legislative Assembly to the voters to float a bond to finance reforestation, which narrowly passed in 1948.

In a book published that same year, Stewart Holbrook wrote about the Tillamook Burn in Northwest Corner: Oregon and Washington:

[Reforestation] can never compensate for that tragedy we call the Tillamook Burn, as somber a sight as to be viewed this side of the Styx. There they stand, millions of ghostly firs, now stark against the sky, which were green as the sea and twice as handsome, until an August day of 1933, when a tiny spark blew into a hurricane of fire that removed all life from 300,000 acres (120,000 ha) of the finest timber even seen. It was timber, too, that had been 400 years in the making. It was wiped out in a few seething hours which Oregon will have reason to remember well past the year 2000. To this day the forest stands powerless against the threat of wildfires.

Reforestation was performed simultaneously with research by the forest industry into the best methods of growing and planting the young trees (including how to protect them from the ravages of deer, beavers, mice and other wildlife). Young people from northwest Oregon helped with the hand-planting of seedlings. Between 1949 and 1972, they planted about a million seedlings, a massive number but still only about 1 percent of the total of 72 million seedlings replanted by all means. Everything from state prisoners to newly designed helicopters played a part in the reseeding program over the years. Eventually the forest began to return and in 1973, Oregon Governor Tom McCall dedicated the Tillamook Burn as the Tillamook State Forest.

At the time the reforestation of the Tillamook Burn began, some assumed that the forest land would, when the trees were mature, be harvested for lumber. Current environmental beliefs have questioned this assumption, and both the proportions and specific parts of this land that will be logged or conserved for wildlife are in dispute.

== In popular culture ==
Poet and author Albert Drake titled a 1970s book of poems and essays, Tillamook Burn, from his experiences growing up in Oregon.

Folk singer Sufjan Stevens references the Tillamook Burn in his song "Fourth of July" from his album Carrie & Lowell.

Martin Milner mentioned the Tillamook Burn in the 1960 Route 66 episode “Legacy for Lucia.”

== General and cited references ==
- Lucia, Ellis, Tillamook Burn Country: A Pictorial History (1984, Caxton Printers) (ISBN 0-87004-296-3).
- Wells, Gail, The Tillamook (Oregon State University Press, 1999) ISBN 0-87071-464-3
- Holbrook, Stewart and Henry Sheldon (1948). Northwest Corner: Oregon and Washington: The Last Frontier. Garden City, NY: Doubleday & Company
