= Round Top (Oregon) =

Mountain in Oregon, United States

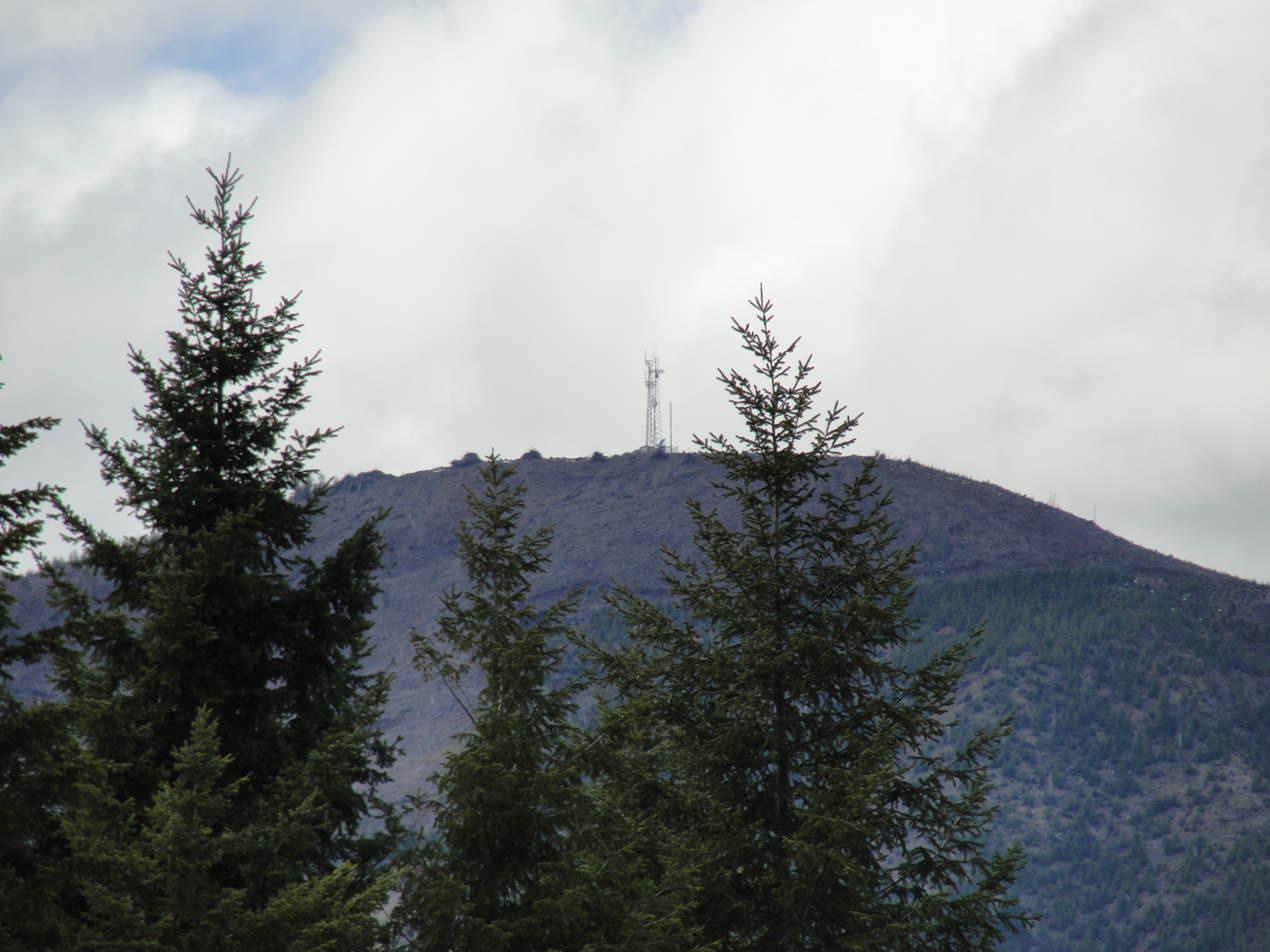

Highest point
- Elevation: 2,983 ft (909 m) NAVD 88
- Coordinates: 45°40′37″N 123°21′46″W

Geography
- Location within Oregon
- Location: Washington County, Oregon, U.S.
- Parent range: Northern Oregon Coast Range
- Topo map: USGS Timber

Round Top is the third-highest mountain in Washington County, Oregon with an elevation of 2,982 feet (909 m). It is in the Northern Oregon Coast Range and is located 4.3 miles (7 km) southwest of Timber, and 9 miles (14.5 km) north of South Saddle Mountain. From 1933 to 1946, the summit was the site of a fire lookout tower and cabin.
