= Gales Creek (Oregon) =

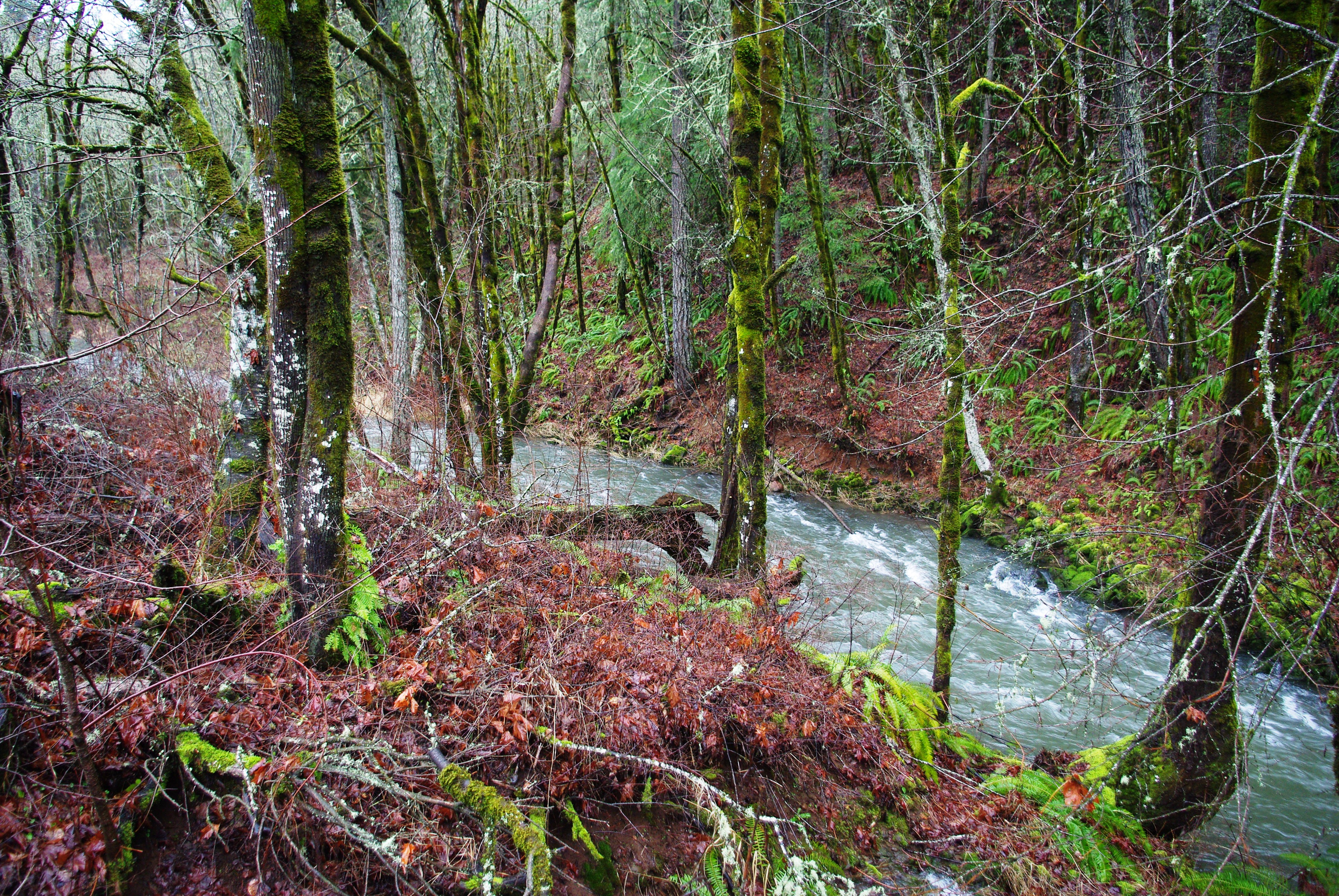
- Gales Creek near intersection of Oregon Route 8 and Oregon Route 6

- Location of the mouth of Gales Creek in Oregon
- Etymology: Joseph Gale, a pioneer member of the Provisional Government of Oregon who settled for a while near the creek

Location
- Country: United States
- State: Oregon
- County: Washington County

Physical characteristics
- Source: near Round Top
  - location: Northern Oregon Coast Range
  - coordinates: 45°40′57″N 123°21′49″W
  - elevation: 2,387 ft (728 m)
- Mouth: Tualatin River
  - location: 1.6 miles (2.6 km) south of Forest Grove
  - coordinates: 45°29′29″N 123°06′08″W
  - elevation: 154 ft (47 m)
- Length: 23.5 mi (37.8 km)
- Basin size: 77.9 sq mi (202 km^{2})
- Discharge
  - location: Route 47 bridge at Forest Grove; 2.36 miles (3.80 km) from the mouth
  - average: 202 cu ft/s (5.7 m^{3}/s)
  - minimum: 6.4 cu ft/s (0.18 m^{3}/s)
  - maximum: 1,880 cu ft/s (53 m^{3}/s)

Gales Creek, is a tributary, 23.5 miles (37.8 km) long, of the Tualatin River in Washington County, Oregon, United States. The headwaters of Gales Creek are on the north side of the mountain Round Top in the Northern Oregon Coast Range. The community of Gales Creek, Oregon, is near the creek, which further downstream forms the southwest border of the city of Forest Grove.

== Course ==
Gales Creek arises at an elevation of 2,387 feet (728 m) above sea level and falls 2,233 feet (681 m) between source and mouth to an elevation of 154 feet (47 m). The stream begins at river mile (RM) 23.5 or river kilometer (RK) 37.8 on the north side of Round Top, a mountain in the Northern Oregon Coast Range. Lying entirely within Washington County, the creek at first flows west, then south, then east just before reaching Gales Creek Forest Park, on the left, and receiving Low Divide Creek from the right at RM 22.76 (RK 36.63). Downstream of the park, Oregon Route 6 is on the right as the stream receives North Fork Gales Creek from the left and shortly thereafter South Fork Gales Creek from the right 20.70 miles (33.31 km) from the mouth.

Finger Creek and Coffee Creek enter in quick succession before Gales Creek passes under Route 6 and flows by Gales Creek Children's Camp, passes under Route 6 again and then County Road 374 before reaching the community of Glenwood and receiving Beaver Creek from the left 18 miles (29 km) from the mouth. Turning south, the creek receives Bateman Creek from the right about 2 miles (3.2 km) below Glenwood. Gales Creek turns to the southeast, and Lyda Creek enters from the right before Gales Creek passes under Route 6 for the third time and receives White Creek from the right. At this point, Gales Creek is flowing parallel to Oregon Route 8, which is on the stream's right.

Passing under Parson Road Bridge, the creek receives Little Beaver Creek from the left before passing under Clapshaw Hill Road Bridge and receiving Fir Creek from the right and passing under Route 8 at the community of Gales Creek. Here Iller Creek enters from the right at RM 11.44 (RK 18.41). Flowing south, Gales Creek receives Clear Creek from the right, Kelley Creek from the left, and Godfrey Creek from the right in quick succession. It then passes under Roderick Road Bridge and receives Roderick Creek from the right 7.70 miles (12.39 km) from the mouth.

Trending southeast again, the creek passes under Stringtown Road Bridge before receiving Prickett Creek from the right and passing under Ritchey Road Bridge at RM 3.66 (RK 5.89). It then flows along the southwest side of Forest Grove, passing an Oregon Water Resources Department (OWRD) stream gauge 2.36 miles (3.80 km) from the mouth at the Oregon Route 47 Bridge. Shortly thereafter, the creek flows under a Southern Pacific Railroad bridge, continues about another 1.5 miles (2.4 km), and empties into the Tualatin River about 57 miles (92 km) from its confluence with the Willamette River.

=== Discharge ===
The OWRD monitors the flow of Gales Creek at a stream gauge at the Route 47 bridge in Forest Grove. The gauge is 2.36 miles (3.80 km) upstream of the mouth of the creek. The average flow of the creek at this station in 2008, the only full calendar year for which data was available in 2010, was 202 cubic feet per second (5.7 m^{3}/s). The maximum flow recorded there was 1,880 cubic feet per second (53 m^{3}/s) on January 11, 2008, and the minimum flow was 6.4 cubic feet per second (0.18 m^{3}/s) on September 17, 2008.

== See also ==
- List of rivers of Oregon

== Works cited ==
- Breuner, Nancy; Resource Assistance for Rural Environments (1998). "Gales Creek Watershed Assessment Project". Tualatin River Watershed Council. Retrieved February 9, 2010.
- McArthur, Lewis A., and McArthur, Lewis L. (2003) [1928]. Oregon Geographic Names, 7th ed. Portland: Oregon Historical Society Press. ISBN 0-87595-277-1.
