= Shingle beach =

Beach composed of gravel

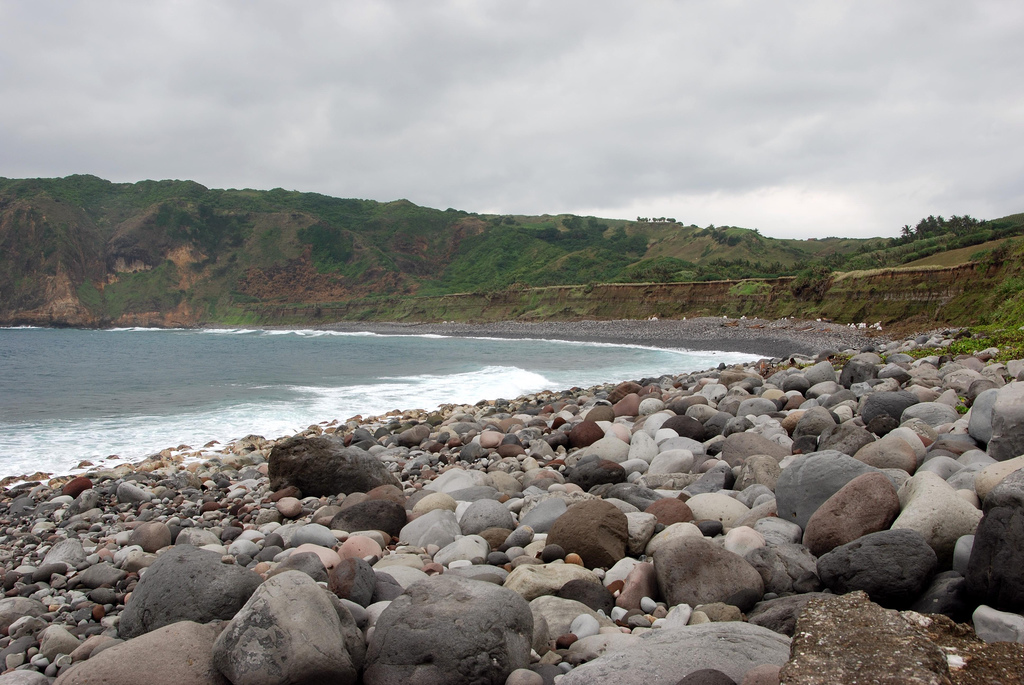
A shingle beach in Batanes, Philippines

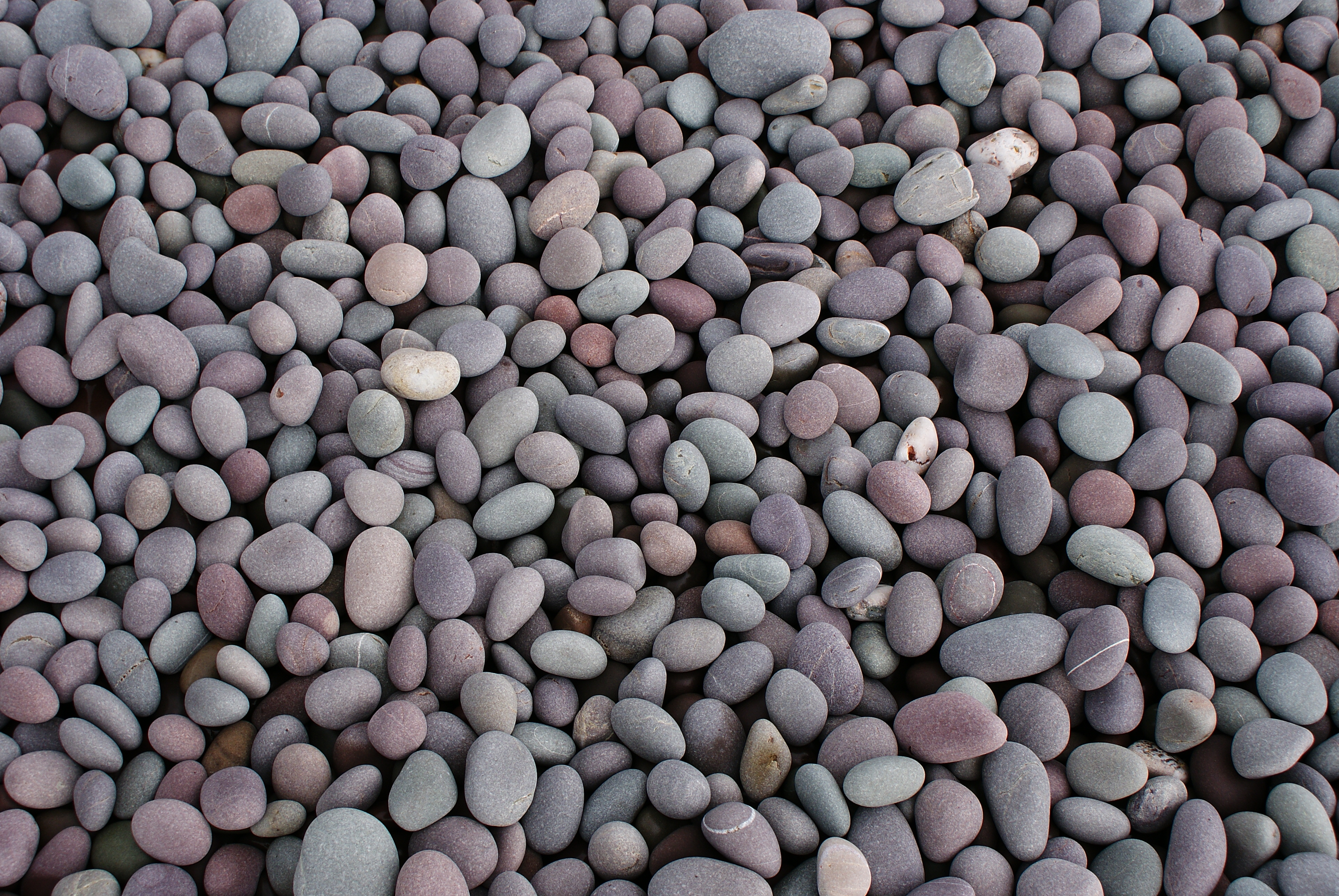
Pebbles on a shingle beach in Somerset, England

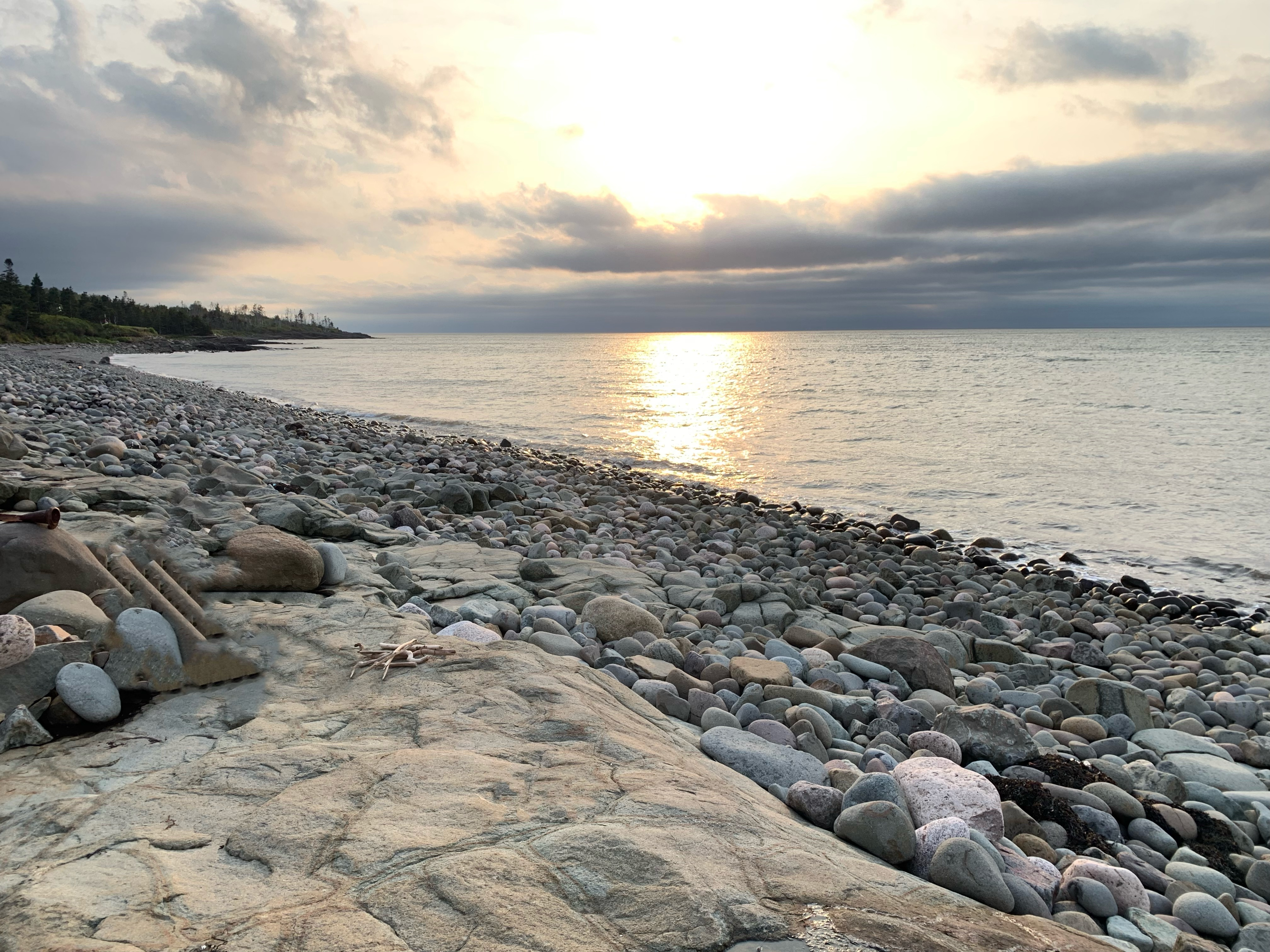
Shingle Beach in Hillsburn, Nova Scotia, Canada

A shingle beach, also known as either a cobble beach or gravel beach, is a commonly narrow beach that is composed of coarse, loose, well-rounded, and waterworn gravel, called shingle. The gravel (shingle) typically consists of smooth, spheroidal to flattened, pebbles, cobbles, and sometimes small boulders, generally in the 2 to 20 centimetres (0.8 to 7.9 in) size range. Shingle beaches typically have a steep slope on both their landward and seaward sides. Shingle beaches form in wave-dominated locations where resistant bedrock cliffs provide gravel-sized rock debris. They are also found in high latitudes and temperate shores where the erosion of Quaternary glacial deposits provides gravel-size rock fragments. This term is most widely used in Great Britain.

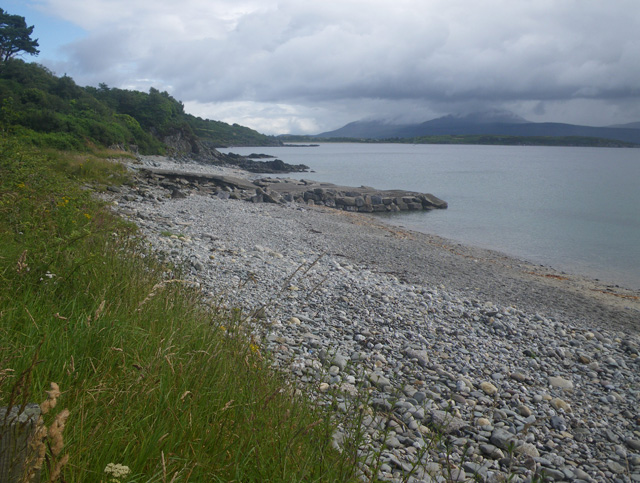
Shingle beach at Torrisdale Bay, Argyll and Bute, Scotland

While this type of beach is most commonly found in Europe, examples are also found in Bahrain, North America, and a number of other world regions, such as the west coast of New Zealand's South Island, where they are associated with the shingle fans of braided rivers. Though created at shorelines, post-glacial rebound can raise shingle beaches as high as 200 metres (660 ft) above sea level, as on the High Coast in Sweden.

The ecosystems formed by this association of rock and sand allows colonization by a variety of rare and endangered species.

== Formation ==
Shingle beaches are typically steep, because the waves easily flow through the coarse, porous surface of the beach, decreasing the effect of backwash erosion and increasing the formation of sediment into a steeply sloping beach.

== Tourism ==
Shingle beaches are rare, made up of thousands of smooth rocks with varying geological qualities. The ocean naturally smooths the various rocks over time with crashing waves. Shingle beaches are popular for the varying rock types that can be found.

== See also ==
- Machair
- Storm beach
- Star sand
