= Gyppo logger =

Type of logger

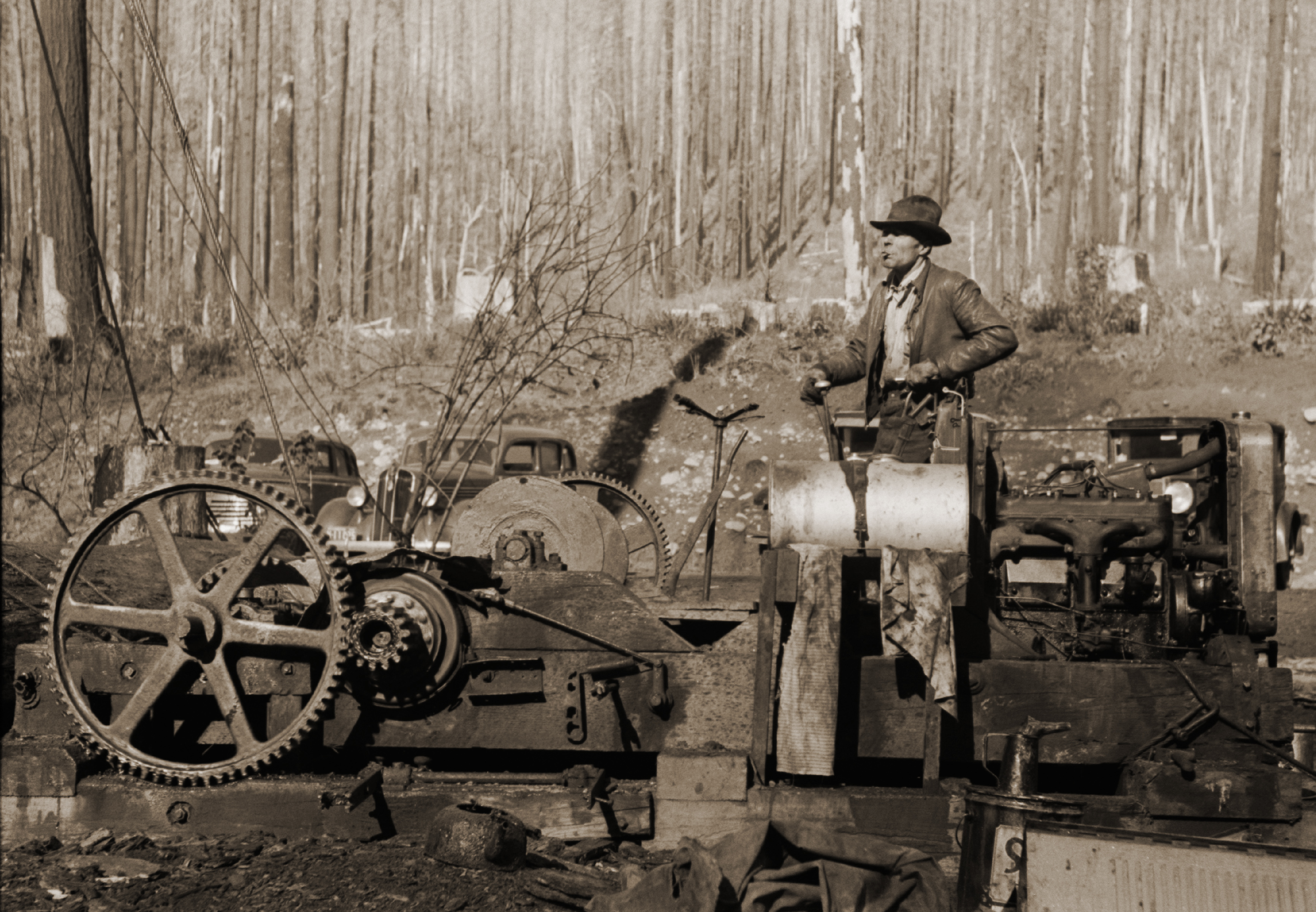
A "donkey puncher" on the job at a gyppo logging operation in Tillamook County, Oregon, October 1941

A gyppo or gypo logger is a logger who runs or works for a small-scale logging operation that is independent from an established sawmill or lumber company. The gyppo system is one of two main patterns of historical organization of logging labor in the Pacific Northwest United States, the other being the "company logger".

Gyppo loggers were originally condemned by the Industrial Workers of the World (IWW) as strikebreakers. After the founding of a government-sponsored company union, the Loyal Legion of Loggers and Lumbermen, weakened the influence of the IWW on the logging industry, attitudes towards gyppos changed, and they came to be seen by the victorious bosses and scabs as a normal component of the timber business in a less ideologically charged context.

== Etymology and context ==
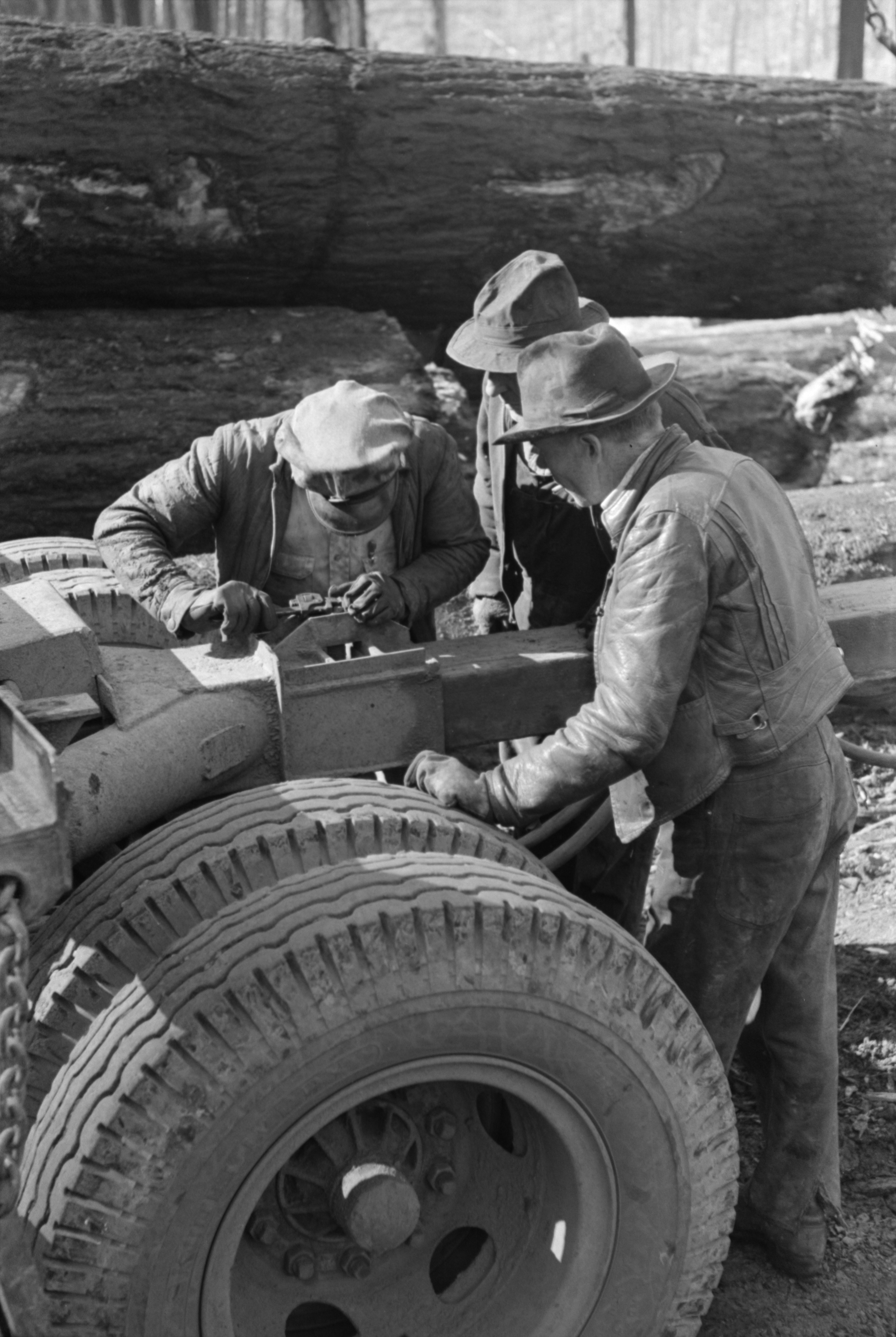
Crew of gyppo logging outfit, Tillamook County, Oregon, October 1941

The term "gyppo" is specific to the Pacific Northwest region of the United States and Canada. The word was introduced by the Industrial Workers of the World (IWW) to disparage strikebreakers and other loggers who thwarted their organizing efforts. The IWW currently uses the term to refer to "Any piece-work system; a job where the worker is paid by the volume they produce, rather than by their time." Mittelman quotes an editorial from the Industrial Worker on the subject:

At present the master class of capitalists call it 'contract labor,' 'piece work,' and other fancy names...For us, the proletarians, it is 'gyppoing' and it means all that the name connotes. The gyppo is a man who 'gyps' his fellow workers and finally himself, out of the fruits of all our organized victories in the class war."

The term "gyppo" was commonly prepended to form nicknames among loggers, e.g. "Gyppo Jake".

The term lost most of its derisive connotation after the decline of the IWW's influence in the lumber industry.

== The gyppo system ==
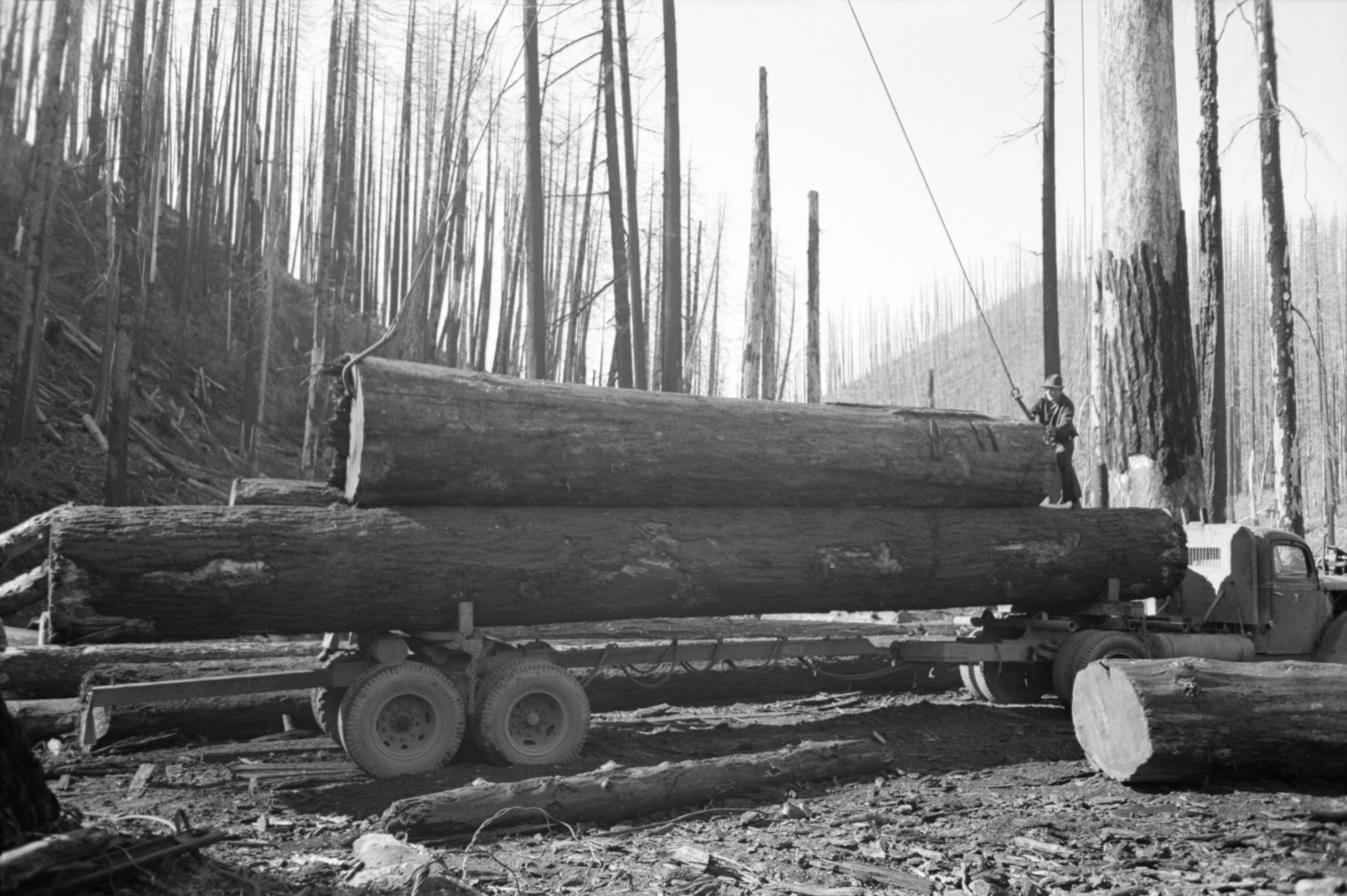
Loading logs onto a truck for transportation to a mill, Tillamook County, Oregon, October 1941

The "gyppo logger" is generally considered the opposite of the "company logger", who is employed by a lumber company or lumber mill at an hourly or daily wage and generally belongs to a labor union. Gyppos, on the other hand, work for themselves, run economically marginal operations, and employ a small crew on a fixed-price basis, although they occasionally work for mills on a flat-rate, contract, or piecework basis.

The IWW first introduced the term gyppo during the unsuccessful 1917–18 Pacific Northwest loggers' strike, which called for an eight-hour day for loggers, although undoubtedly gyppo loggers existed before this date. Gyppo was meant to be a reworking of "gypsy", to be without loyalty as in to the company, and also as these workers were portrayed as "gypping" or ripping off or stealing from others who towed the company rope. Because the strike was unsuccessful, after the loggers returned to work they called a slowdown. This tactic was so effective that in response the company owners instituted piecework or flat-rate pay scales. Pine timber in the Pacific Northwest is comparatively small and much of it is on government-owned land (disallowing the use of railways to transport logs); these conditions facilitate logging with small crews and portable machinery.

Technological developments after World War II made gyppo logging even more economically rewarding, especially the invention of gasoline-powered chainsaws, which were light enough to be used by a single person, and the use of diesel engines to power "donkeys" that had previously been powered by steam. Gyppos of this era also took advantage of the increased affordability of light industrial equipment, such as trucks and Caterpillar tractors, and typically employed family labor in order to keep their operations economically viable.

According to William Robbins, writing on the postwar timber boom in the Coos Bay region of Oregon:

The immediate postwar years in southwestern Oregon were the heyday of the storied gyppo logging and sawmill operator—the hardy individual who worked on marginal capital, usually through subcontracts with a major company or broker, and whose equipment was invariably pieced together with baling wire.

By the mid-1950s, over-extraction of timber had begun to reduce the economic incentive to practice gyppo logging. By the 1970s, environmental regulation and other economic changes in the logging industry had driven many gyppo loggers out of business. By the early 21st century, gyppo loggers were described as "an endangered species."

== See also ==
- Sometimes a Great Notion, a 1964 novel by Ken Kesey about a family of gyppo loggers in Oregon
