= Octopus Tree (Oregon) =

Tree in Tillamook County, Oregon, U.S.

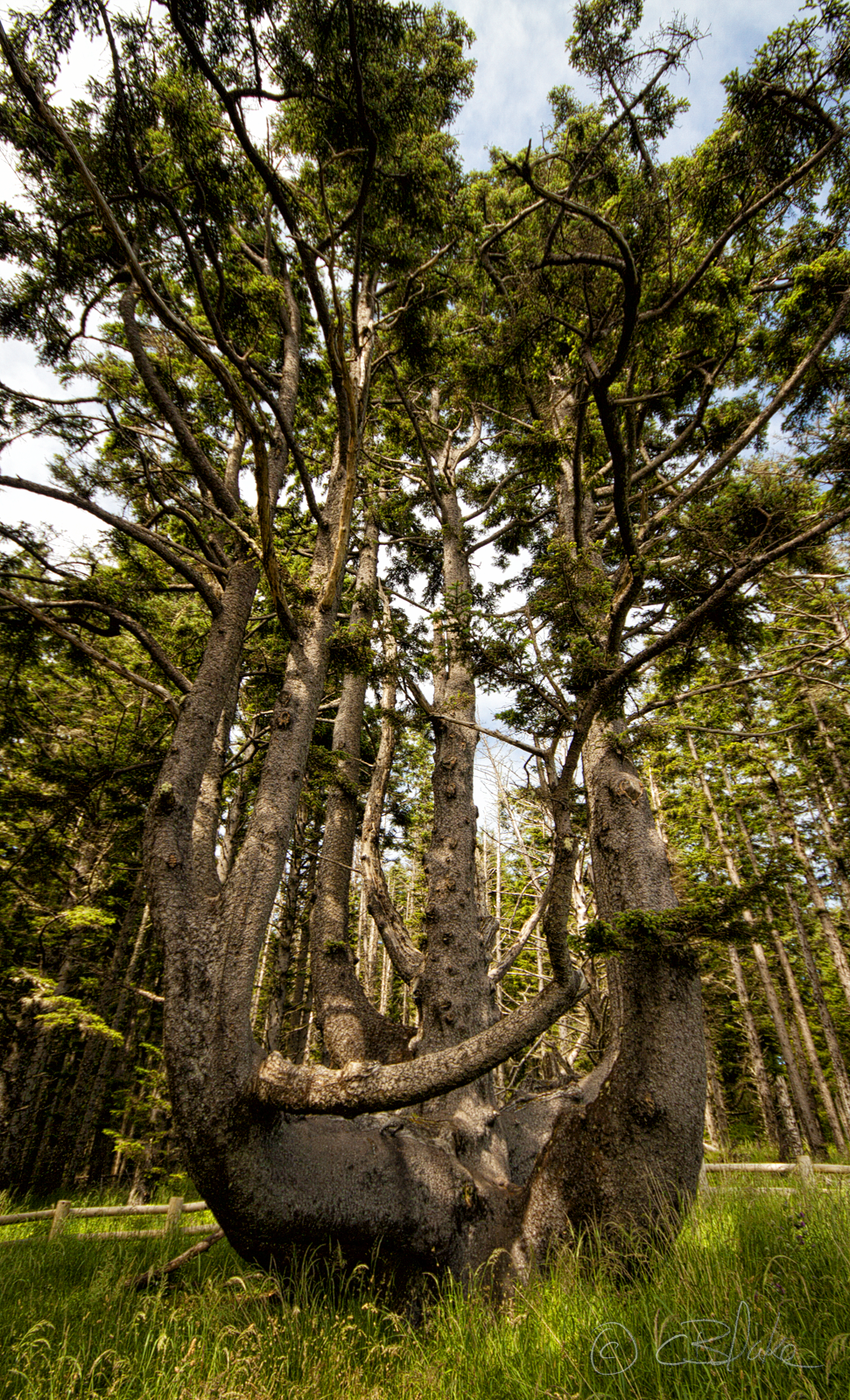

- Location within Oregon
- Location: Cape Meares, Tillamook County, Oregon, United States
- Coordinates: 45.4863°N 123.9780°W

The Octopus Tree (also known as the Candelabra Tree, Council Tree, and Monstrosity Tree) is a Sitka spruce tree on Cape Meares in Tillamook County, Oregon, United States.

== Description ==
The tree is approximately 30 m (105 feet) tall and has no primary trunk. Its circumference is approximately 15 m (46 feet). The tree is estimated to be 250–300 years old and has been described as a "natural wonder". According to the Statesman Journal, "historians say was used by local tribes for ceremonies and was trained into its distinctive octopus shape".

== Reception ==
The Octopus Tree has been designated a state heritage tree by the Oregon Travel Experience. Jamie Hale included the tree in The Oregonian's 2017 lists of "The 12 most iconic landmarks on the Oregon coast" and "The 40 best roadside attractions in Oregon". He also included the Octopus Tree in the newspaper's 2019 list of "The 12 best roadside attractions on the Oregon Coast Highway". The Octopus Tree has also been described as "famous" and "unique".
