= Cape Meares =

Headland in Tillamook County, Oregon, US

- Cape
- Location within Oregon
- Coordinates: 45.4863°N 123.978°W
- Location: Tillamook County, Oregon, United States
- Part of: Cape Meares State Scenic Viewpoint
- Water bodies: Tillamook Bay
- Etymology: John Meares (c. 1756–1809)
- Operator: Oregon Parks and Recreation Department

Cape Meares is a small headland on the Pacific coast in Tillamook County, Oregon, United States. The cape forms a high steep bluff on the south end of Tillamook Bay, approximately five miles (8 km) northwest of the city of Tillamook. Much of the cape is part of the Oregon Parks and Recreation Department-administered Cape Meares State Scenic Viewpoint with three miles of hiking trails, which includes Cape Meares Light and the Octopus Tree. The cape is named after John Meares, a British explorer.

== Geography ==
Immediately north of the cape is the community of Cape Meares, next to Cape Meares Lake. Cape Meares beach extends north of the community of Cape Meares, along a sand spit, or peninsula, that encloses Tillamook Bay. The peninsula is alternatively known as Bayocean, after a popular upscale resort town that occupied the beach in the early 20th century, until beach erosion began to destroy the town beginning in the 1930s. Today, no significant remnant of the resort town remains on the beach.

Immediately south of Cape Meares is Short Beach.

== Cape Meares State Scenic Viewpoint ==
The scenic viewpoint is the location of the "Octopus Tree", a large, multi-trunked Sitka Spruce with a trunk circumference of about 50 feet. It is accessible via a short hike from the main parking lot.

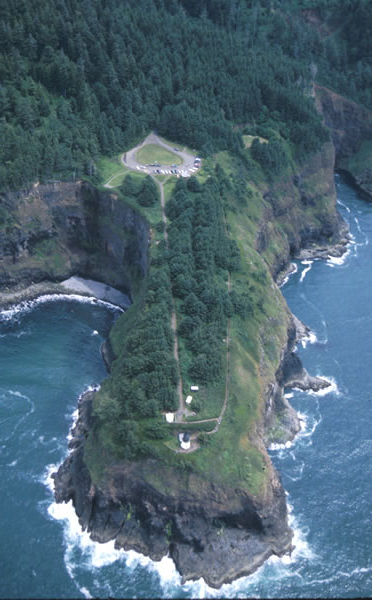
Cape Meares from an airplane

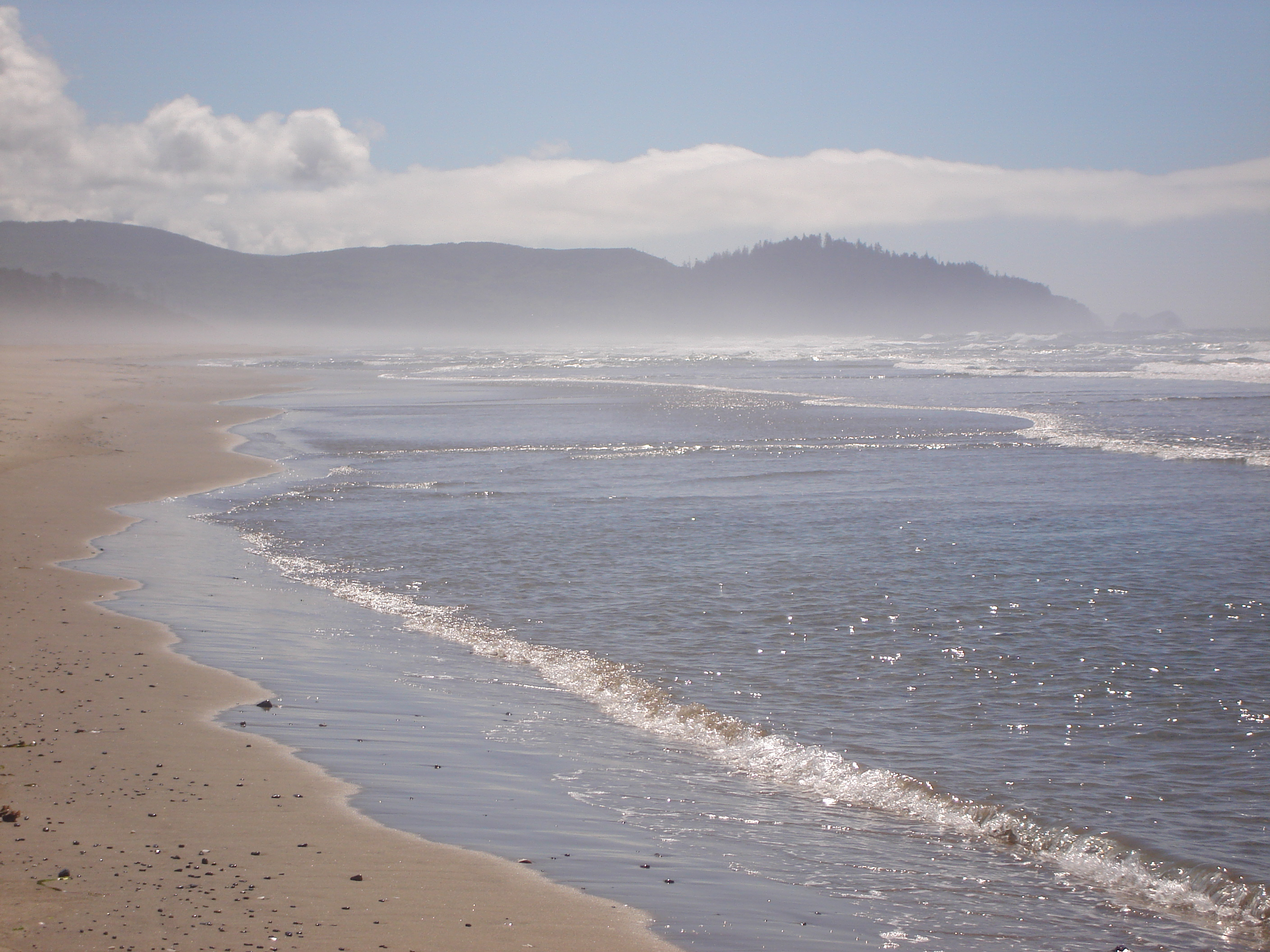
Cape Meares seen from Bayocean beach

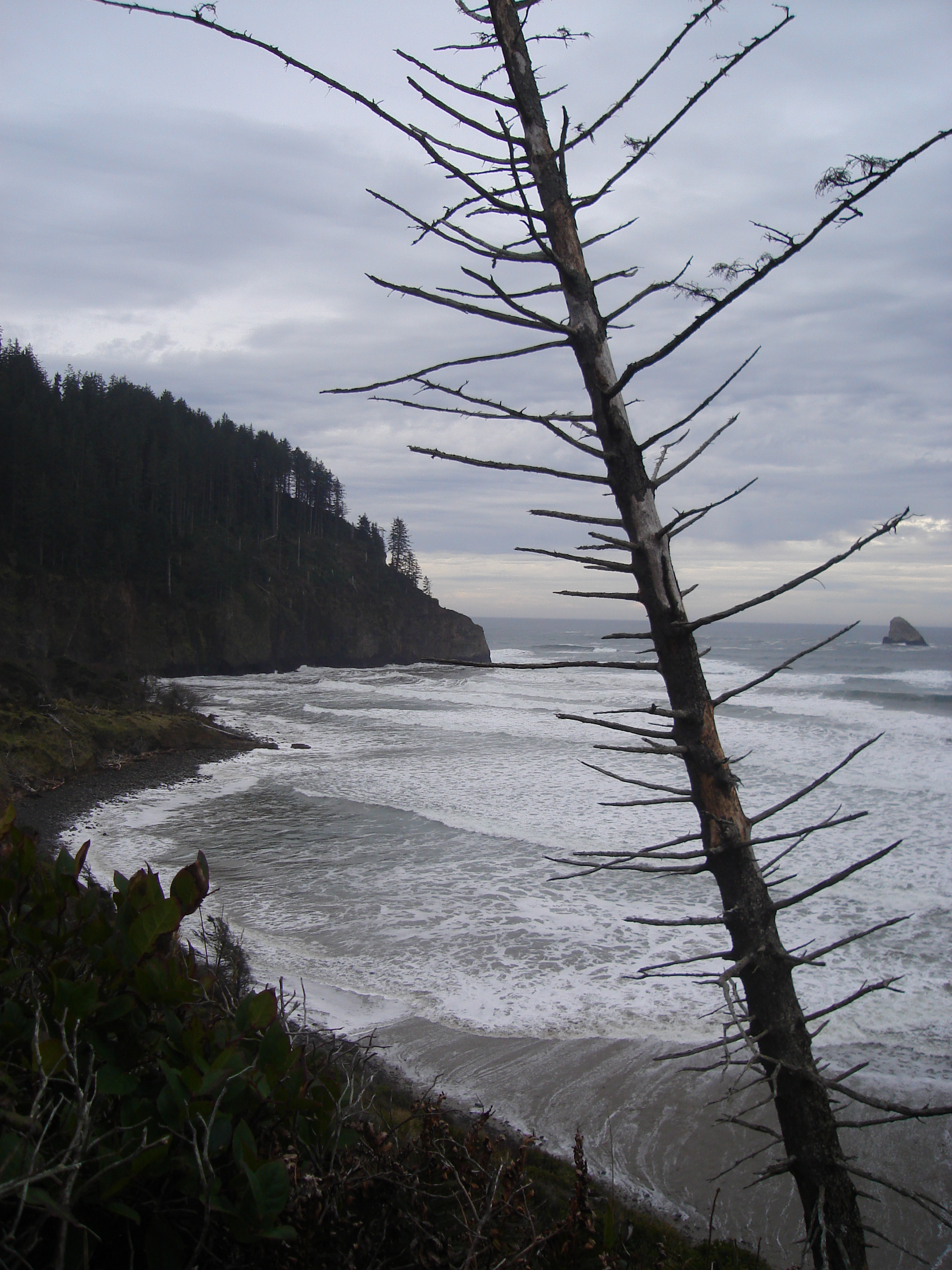
Cape Meares from the north

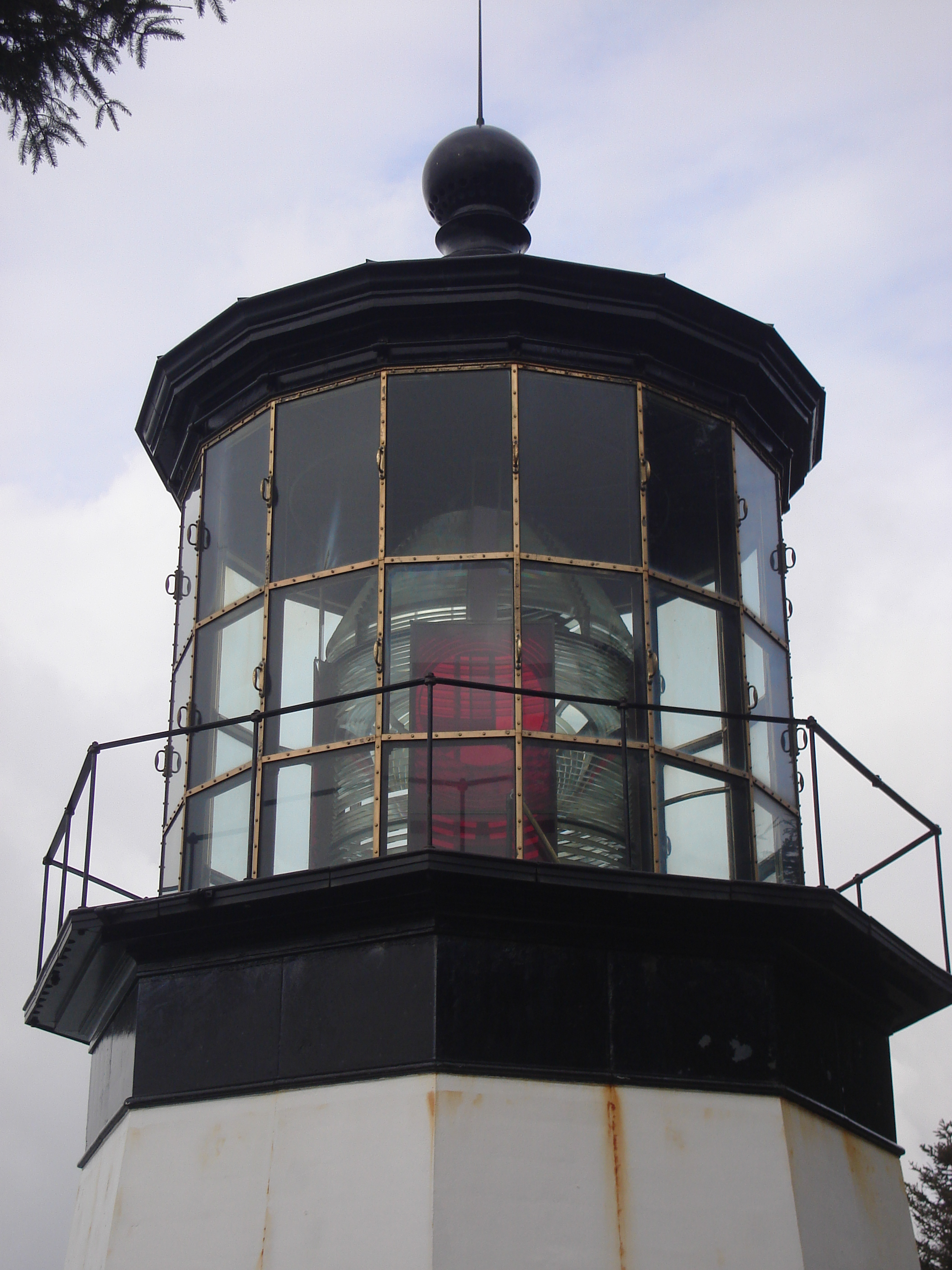
Cape Meares Lighthouse

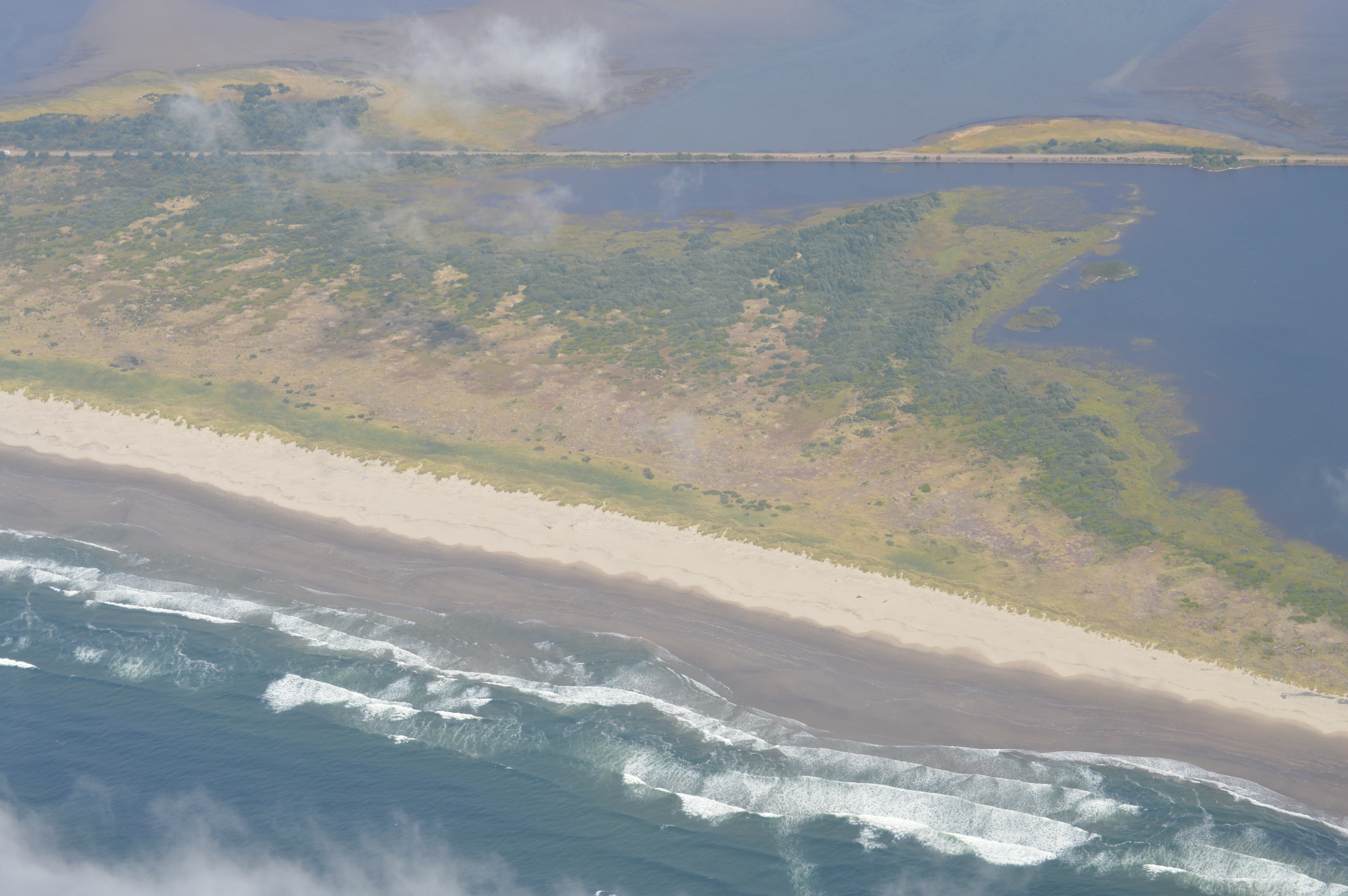
Aerial View of Cape Meares Lake

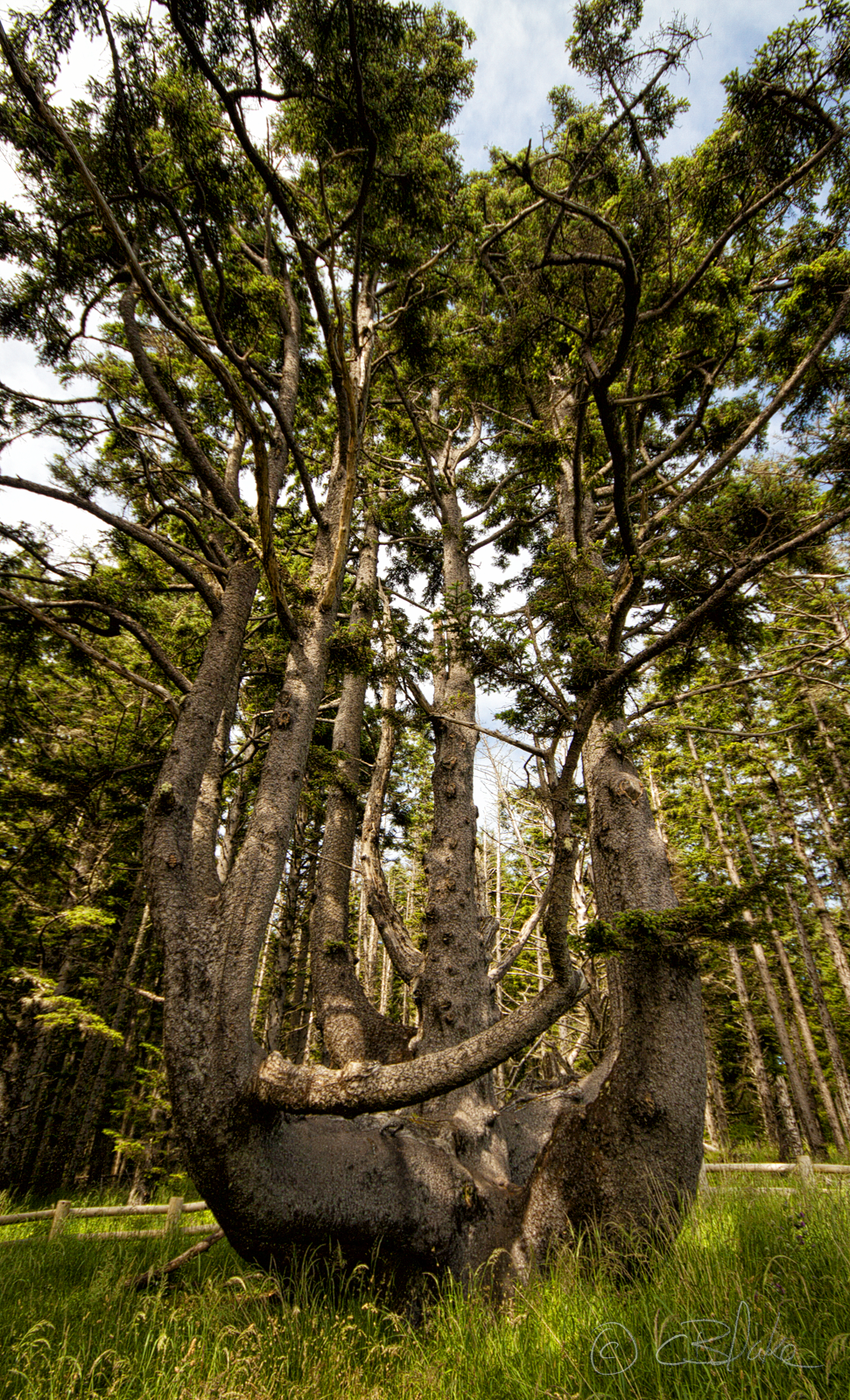
Octopus Tree, Cape Meares, Oregon

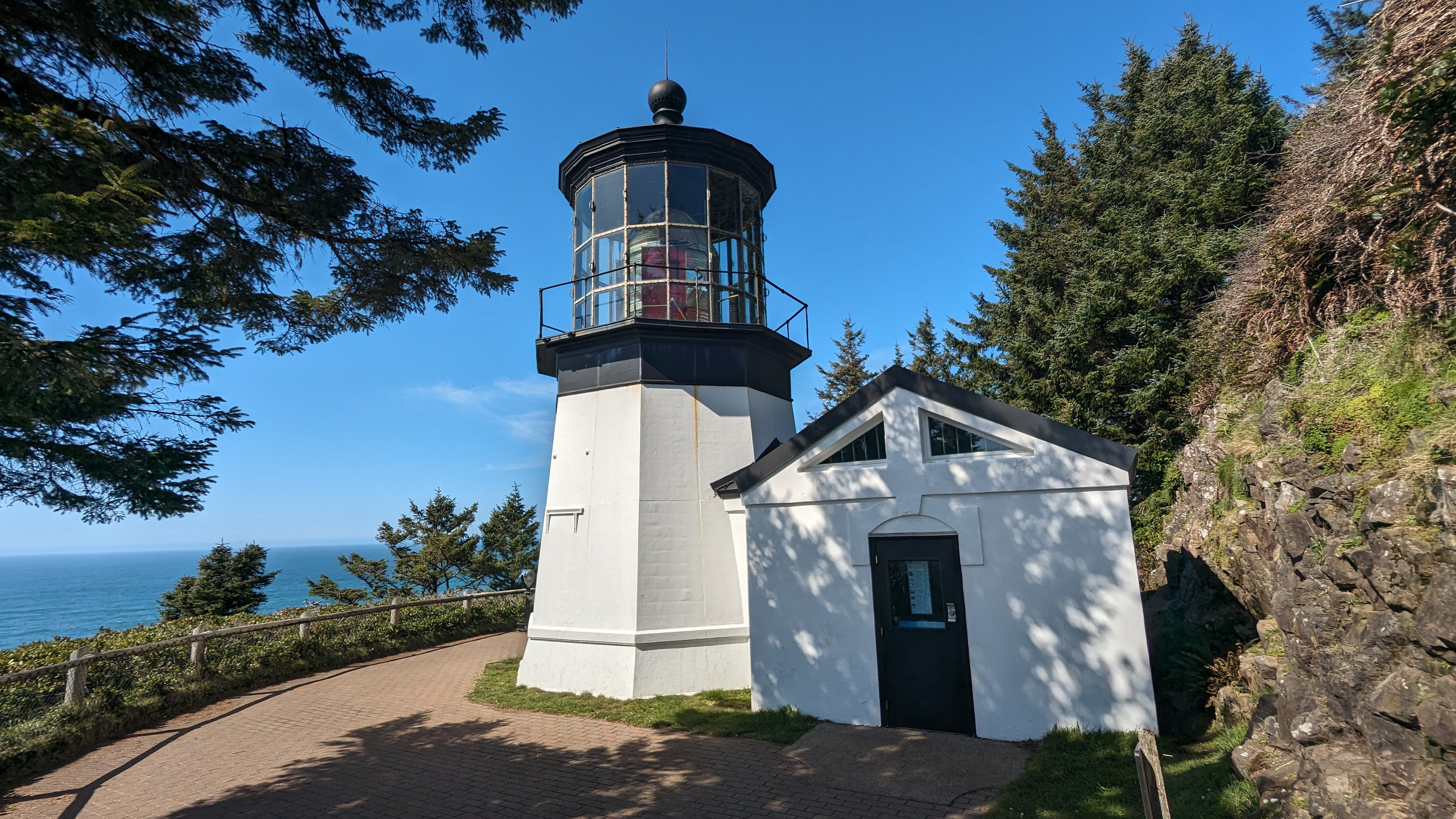
Cape Meares Lighthouse wide shot

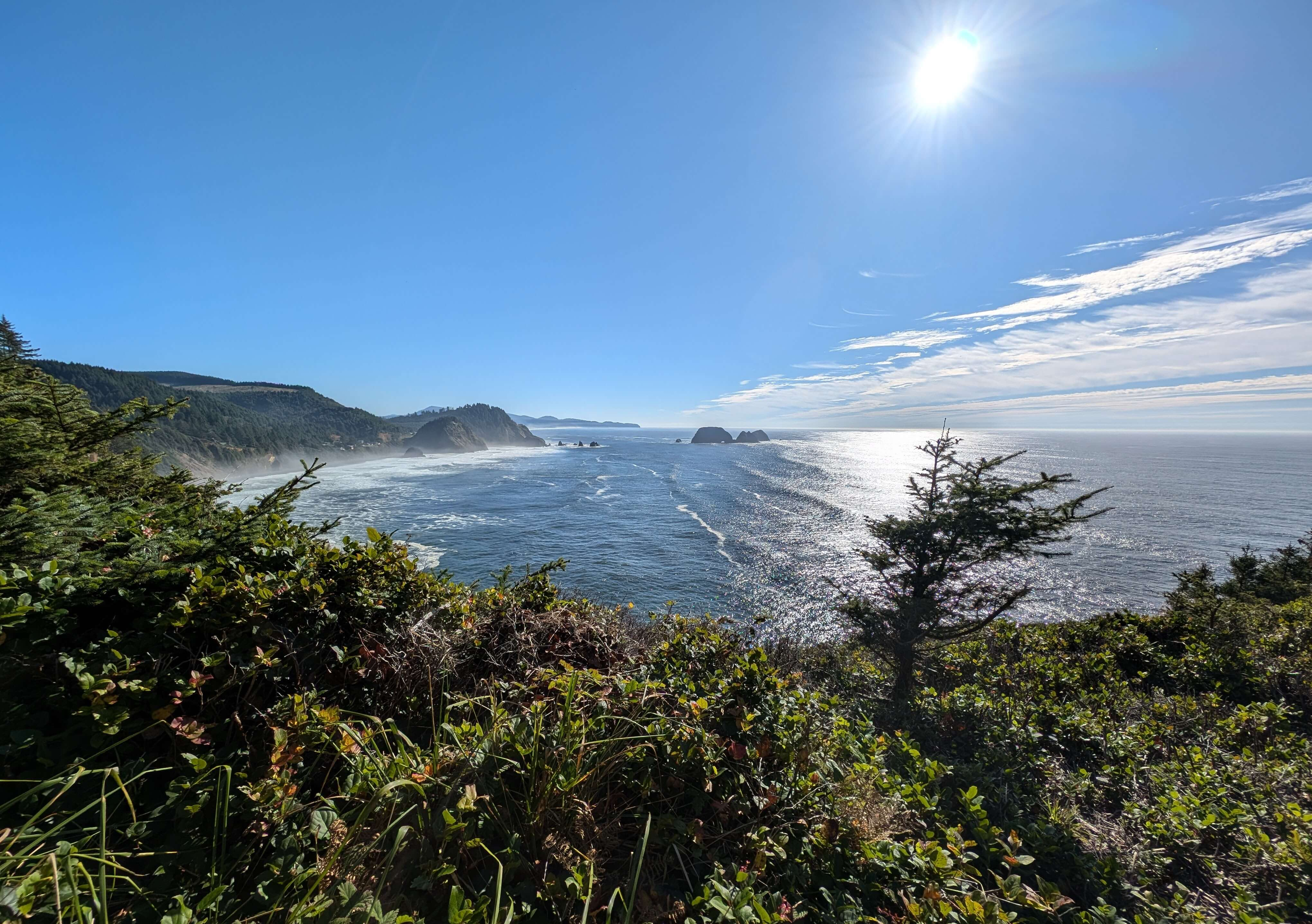
An overlook at The Cape Meares State Scenic Viewpoint

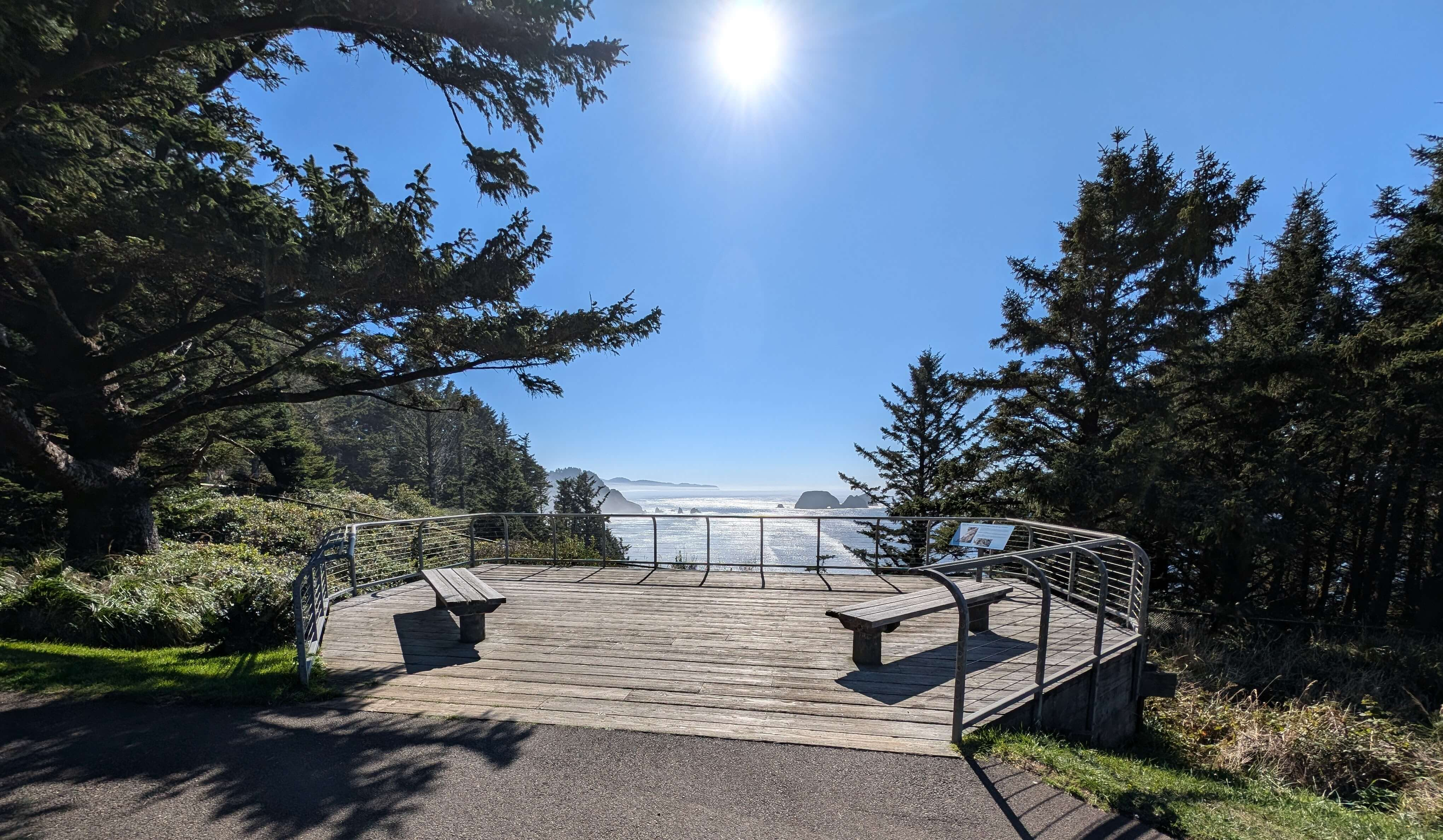
An overlook at The Cape Meares State Scenic Viewpoint

== See also ==
- List of Oregon state parks
