= Oceanside, Oregon =

Unincorporated community in Oregon, United States

- Census-designated place (CDP)
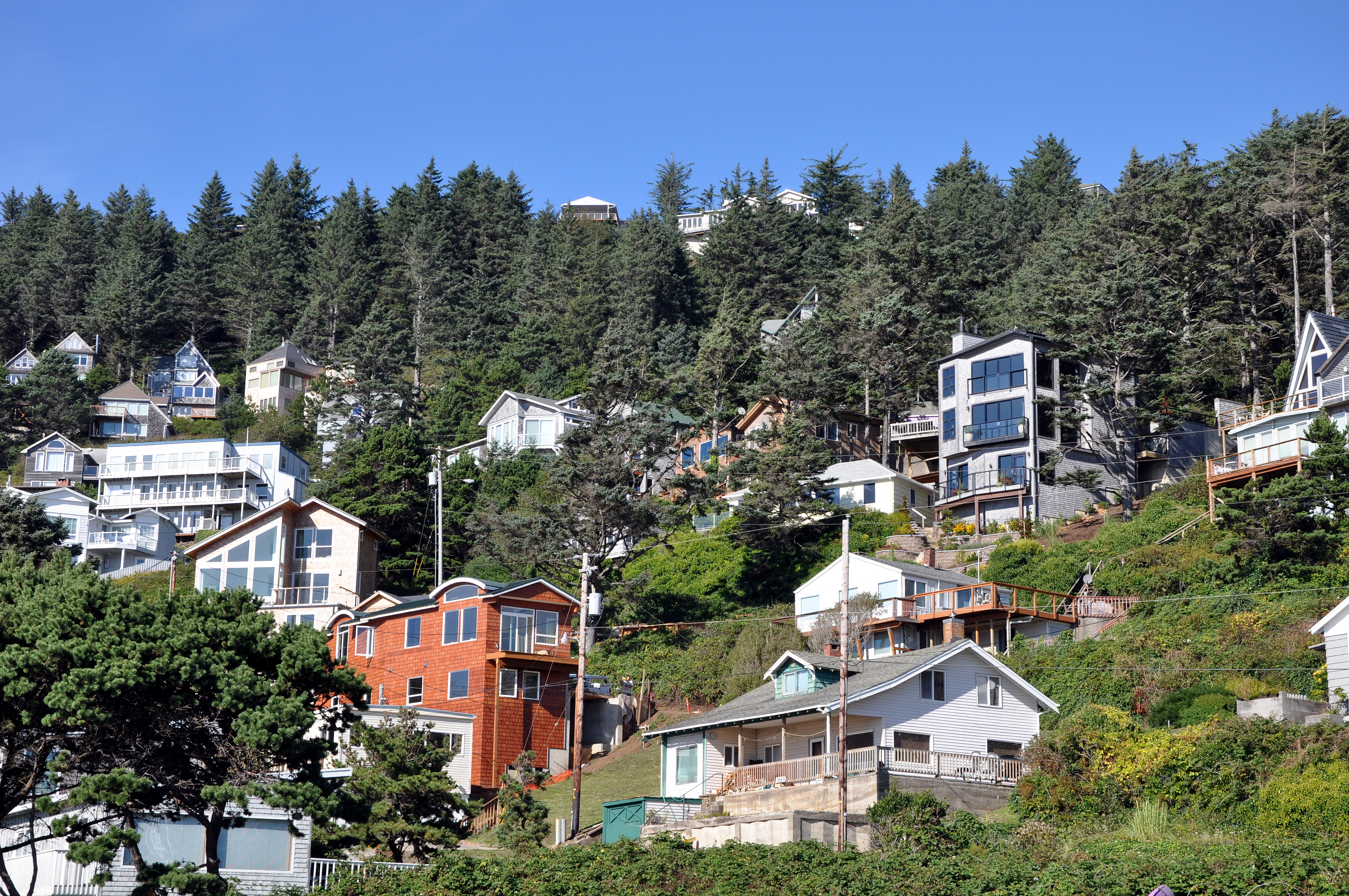
- Oceanside houses face the Pacific.

- Location of Oceanside, Oregon
- Coordinates: 45°27′18″N 123°57′41″W
- Country: United States
- State: Oregon
- County: Tillamook

Area
  - Total: 1.04 sq mi (2.69 km^{2})
  - Land: 1.04 sq mi (2.69 km^{2})
  - Water: 0 sq mi (0.00 km^{2})
- Elevation: 331 ft (101 m)

Population (2020)
  - Total: 366
  - Density: 352.7/sq mi (136.16/km^{2})
- Time zone: UTC-8 (Pacific (PST))
  - Summer (DST): UTC-7 (PDT)
- ZIP code: 97134
- Area code: 503
- FIPS code: 41-54450
- GNIS feature ID: 2408975

Oceanside is a census-designated place (CDP) and unincorporated community in Tillamook County, Oregon, United States. As of the 2020 census, Oceanside had a population of 366. Oregon Route 131's northern terminus is in the community, which is just north of Netarts. Symons State Park is in Oceanside, while Three Arch Rocks National Wildlife Refuge lies just offshore.

== Geography ==
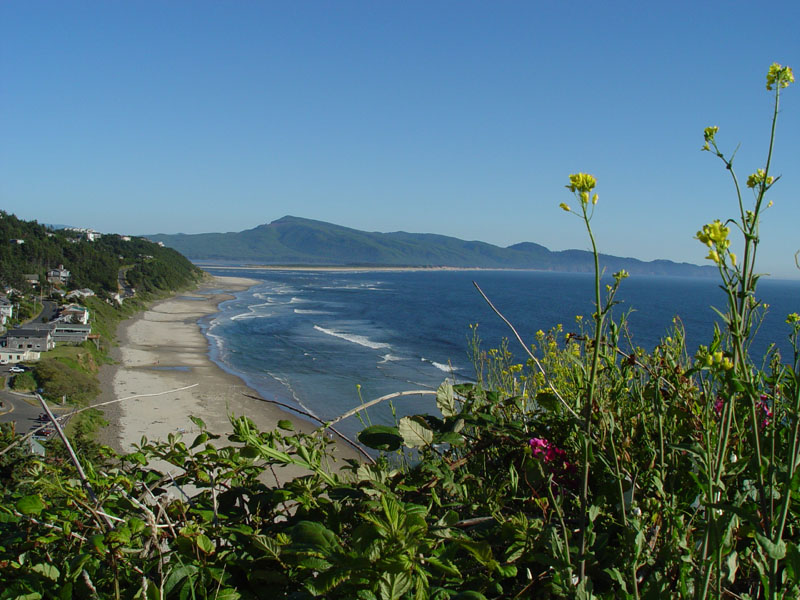
The beach

According to the United States Census Bureau, the CDP has a total area of 1.0 square mile (2.6 km^{2}), all of it land. The area is located 148 feet (45 m) above sea level.

== Demographics ==
Historical population
Census	Pop.	Note	%±
2020	366		—
U.S. Decennial Census

As of the census of 2000, there were 326 people, 193 households, and 99 families residing in the CDP. The population density was 327.1 inhabitants per square mile (126.3/km^{2}). There were 522 housing units at an average density of 523.7 per square mile (202.2/km^{2}). The racial makeup of the CDP was 96.63% White, 0.61% African American, 1.84% Asian, and 0.92% from two or more races. Hispanic or Latino of any race were 1.23% of the population.

There were 193 households, out of which 5.2% had children under the age of 18 living with them, 48.7% were married couples living together, 2.1% had a female householder with no husband present, and 48.2% were non-families. 41.5% of all households were made up of individuals, and 14.0% had someone living alone who was 65 years of age or older. The average household size was 1.69 and the average family size was 2.20.

In the CDP, the population was spread out, with 4.9% under the age of 18, 2.1% from 18 to 24, 16.9% from 25 to 44, 42.0% from 45 to 64, and 34.0% who were 65 years of age or older. The median age was 57 years. For every 100 females, there were 100.0 males. For every 100 females age 18 and over, there were 101.3 males.

The median income for a household in the CDP was $40,708, and the median income for a family was $51,750. Males had a median income of $37,273 versus $28,472 for females. The per capita income for the CDP was $32,158. None of the families and 6.8% of the population were living below the poverty line, including no under eighteens and none of those over 64.

== Education ==
It is in the Tillamook School District 9.

The county is in the Tillamook Bay Community College district.

== See also ==
- Oceanside Beach State Recreation Site
