= Timber, Oregon =

Unincorporated community in the state of Oregon, United States

- Unincorporated community
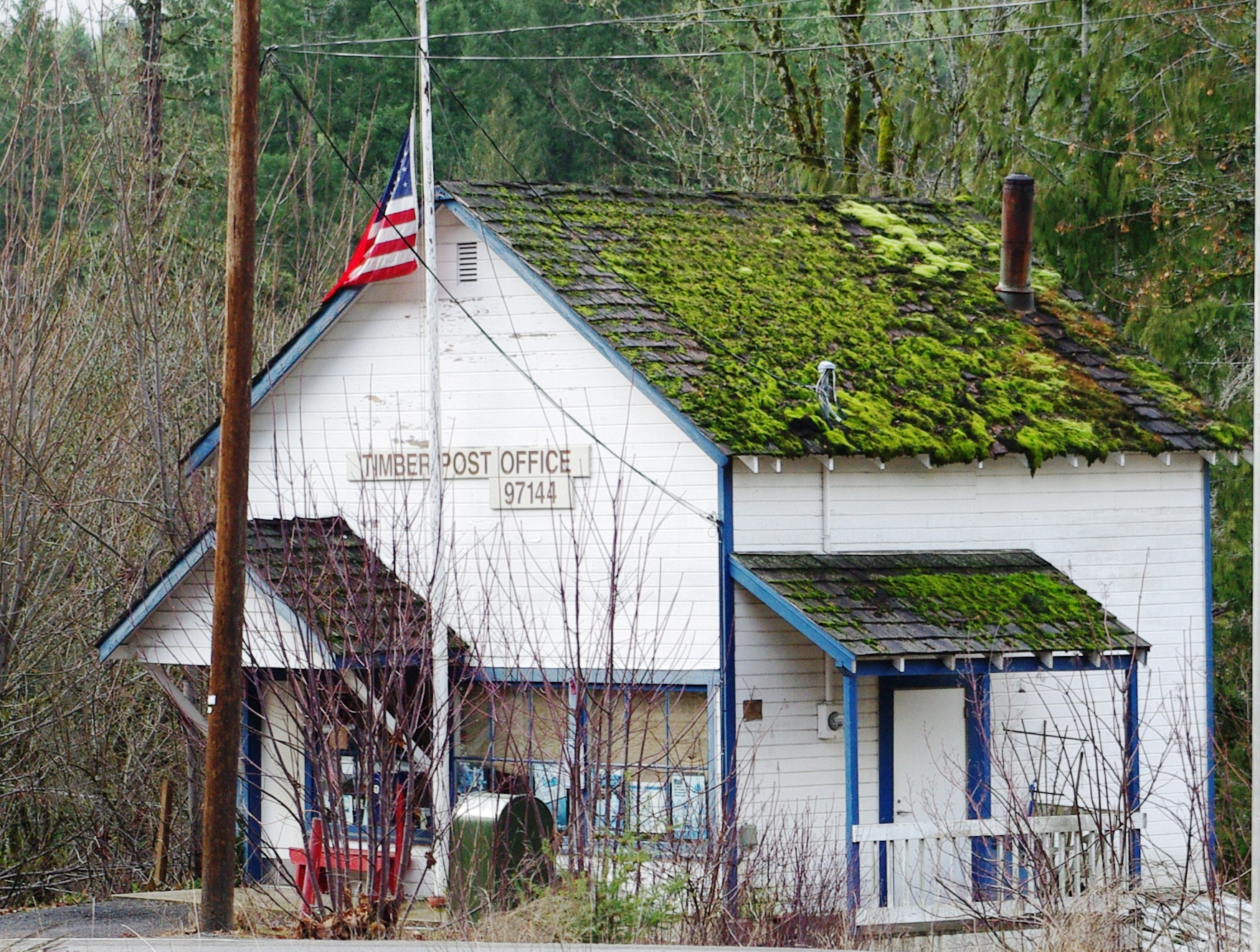
- The post office in Timber

- Location within the state of Oregon Timber, Oregon (the United States)
- Coordinates: 45°43′11″N 123°17′40″W
- Country: United States
- State: Oregon
- County: Washington

Area
  - Total: 17.5 sq mi (45.2 km^{2})
- Elevation: 1,020 ft (310 m)

Population (2000)
  - Total: 131
  - Density: 7.51/sq mi (2.90/km^{2})
- Time zone: UTC-8 (Pacific (PST))
  - Summer (DST): UTC-7 (PDT)
- ZIP codes: 97144
- Area codes: 503 and 971
- GNIS feature ID: 1128100

Timber is an unincorporated community in Washington County, Oregon, United States. Timber's population is 131, its ZIP code is 97144, it has 59 housing units and its land area is 17.45 sq mi (45.2 km^{2}), with a population density of 7.51/sq mi (2.90/km^{2}).

The town is connected to the coast and Portland by US-26 to the north and Oregon Highway 6 to the south. Both highways are served by Timber Road which runs mainly north-south through the center of town.

== Climate ==
This region experiences warm (but not hot) and dry summers and chilly, wet winters, with no average monthly temperatures above 71.6 °F. According to the Köppen Climate Classification system, Timber has a warm-summer Mediterranean climate, abbreviated "Csb" on climate maps. Timber also sits in a prominent local frost hollow, and is capable of recording sub-32 temperatures any month of the year.

== History ==
Timber was the site of multiple logging operations back in the early days of timber harvesting in Oregon. A railroad was built through the town and served as an important method of transportation for both lumber and passengers between Tillamook, the Willamette Valley, and Portland. There have been multiples large fires near the area including the Tillamook and Salmonberry burns. With the introduction of highways, panning out of the large stocks of old-growth lumber, and the decommissioning of the railroad, the town population declined from its former heydays.
