= Oregon Coast Range =

Mountain range in Oregon, United States

- Coast Range
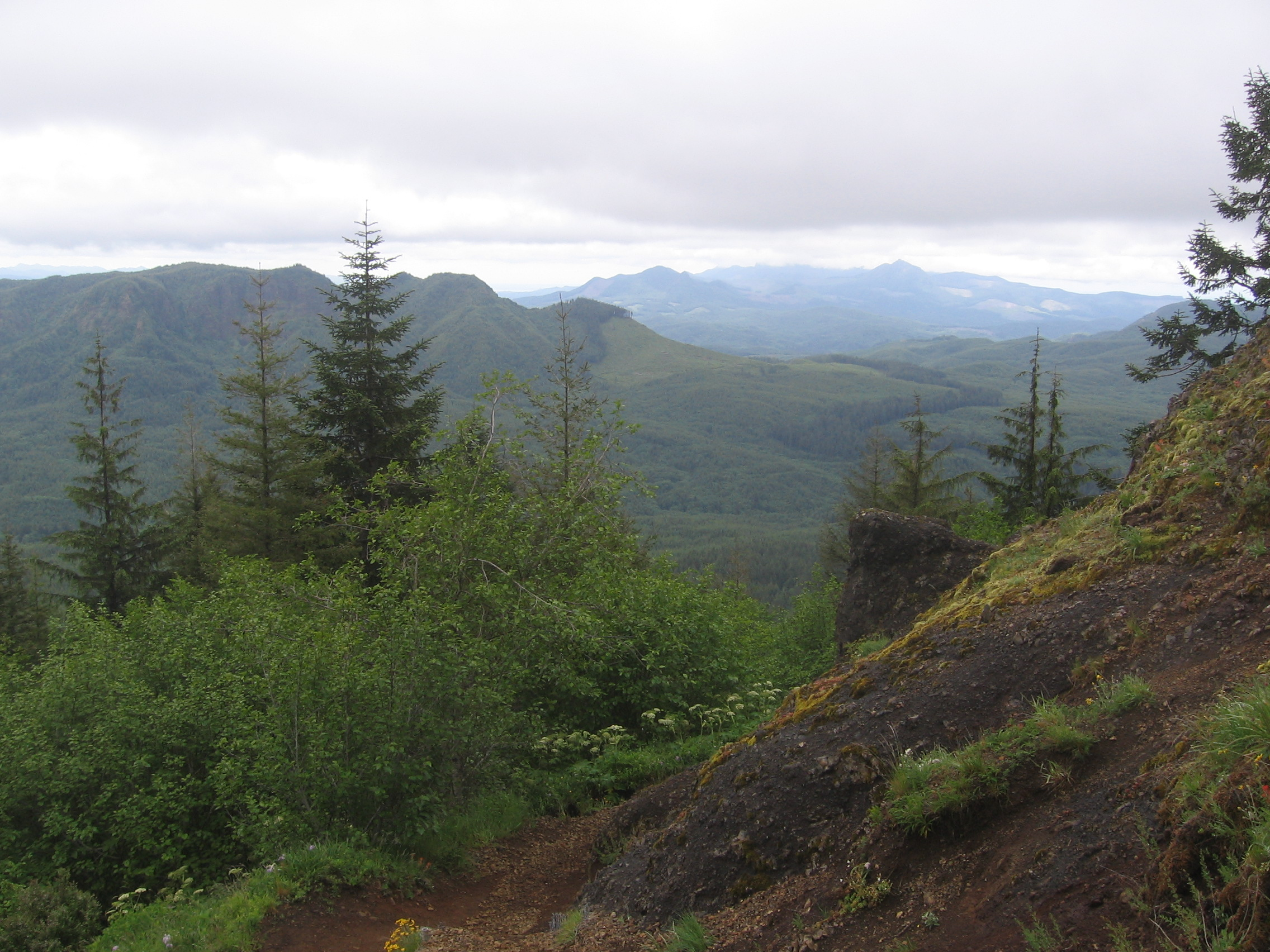
- The Northern Coast Range, seen from Saddle Mountain in Clatsop County

Highest point
- Peak: Marys Peak
- Elevation: 4,101 ft (1,250 m)
- Coordinates: 44°30′16″N 123°33′10″W

Dimensions
- Length: 200 mi (320 km) North–South

Geography
- Country: United States
- State: Oregon
- Subdivisions: Northern Oregon Coast Range, Central Oregon Coast Range and Southern Oregon Coast Range
- Parent range: Pacific Coast Ranges
- Borders on: Willamette Valley and Klamath Mountains (California Coast Ranges)

Geology
- Rock ages: Paleocene and Eocene
- Rock types: volcanic and forearc basin

The Oregon Coast Range, often called simply the Coast Range and sometimes the Pacific Coast Range, is a heavily forested mountain range, in the Pacific Coast Ranges physiographic region, in the U.S. state of Oregon along the Pacific Ocean. This north-south running range extends over 200 miles (320 km) from the Columbia River in the north on the border of Oregon and Washington, south to the middle fork of the Coquille River. It is 30 to 60 mi (48 to 97 km) wide and averages around 1,500 feet (460 m) in elevation above sea level. The coast range has three main sections: the Northern, Central, and Southern Ranges.

The oldest portions of the range are over 60 million years old, with volcanic activity and a forearc basin being the primary mountain building processes responsible for the mountains. It is part of a larger grouping known as the Pacific Coast Ranges that extends over much of the western edge of North America from California to Alaska. The range creates a rain shadow effect for the Willamette Valley, which lies to the east of the Coast Range and west of the Cascade Range. This rain shadow creates a stable climate in the valley, with significantly less rain than the Oregon Coast. On the western side of the range, the same rain shadow causes more precipitation to fall, contributing to the numerous rivers that flow into the Pacific Ocean.

Marys Peak in the Central Coast Range is the highest peak at 4,097 ft (1,248 m). Both the state and federal government manage forests throughout the Oregon Coast Range, where logging is a major industry in both private and government owned forests. The mountains are home to a variety of wildlife including black bear, elk, deer, beaver, and many species of birds. Fish including salmon and trout, in addition to many other aquatic organisms inhabit the range's streams and rivers.

== Geology ==
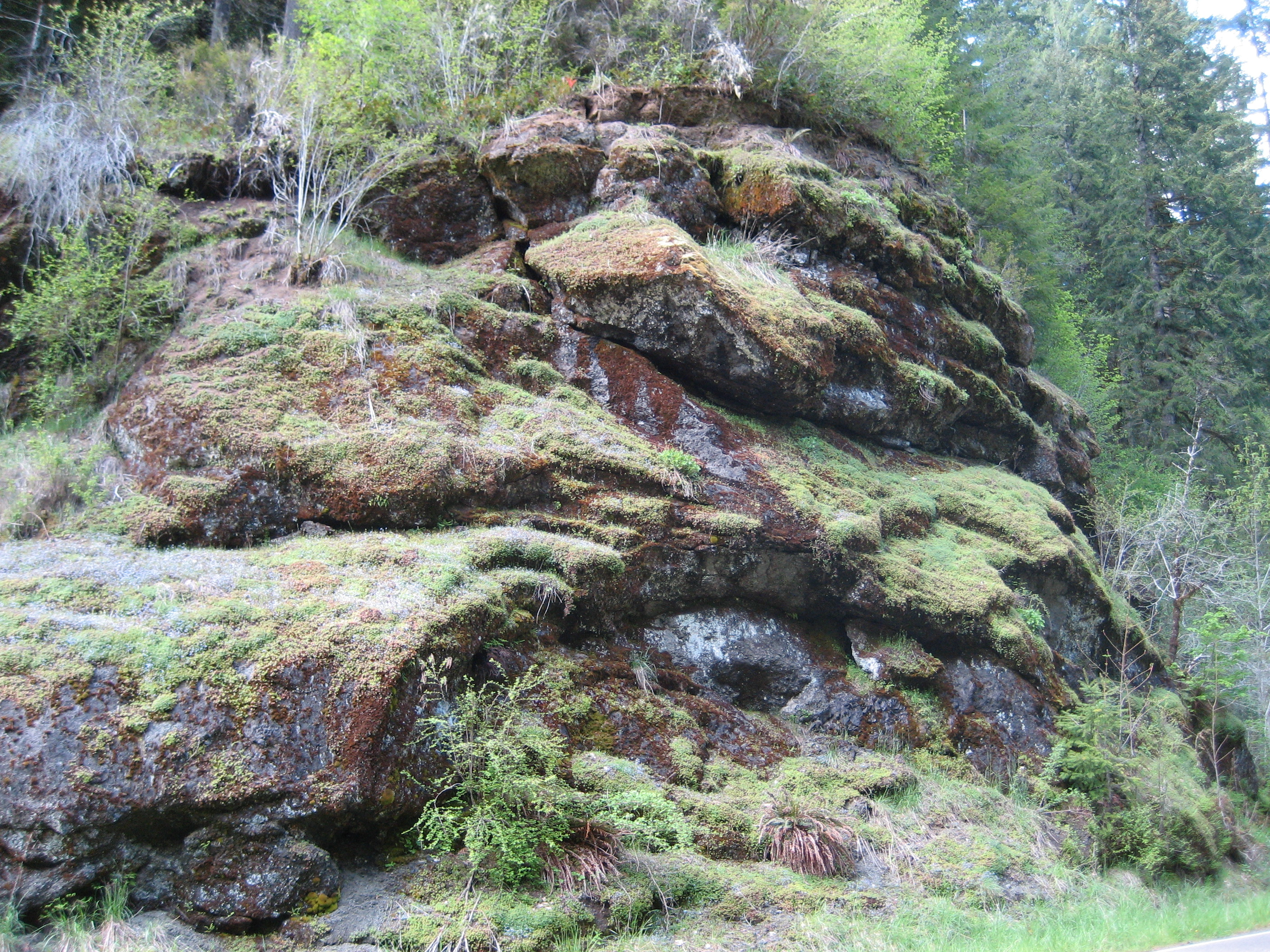
Exposed pillow lava in the Northern range

Volcanic activity approximately 66 million years ago in the Cretaceous Period created offshore islands beginning in the southern portion of the current range. These Roseburg volcanics were followed by the Siletz River Volcanics in the northern portions of the range, and lastly a series of basalt flows from the Columbia River basalts also added to these formations with some smaller flows in-between. Much of the formations are the result of pillow basalt formations created when a hot basalt flow rapidly cooled upon meeting the salt water of the ocean. These deposits offshore were then pushed into the continental plate as a forearc basin rotating slowly over millions of years. This tectonic collision forced the basalt formations (and newer sedimentary rock formations that include marine terrace deposits) upward and created the coastal range.

Additional basalt flows originated from Eastern Oregon and added to the layers that were uplifted, as the newer Cascade Mountains had not yet been formed. By the Early Oligocene period c. 30 million years ago the current coastline was in place and erosion has continued to shape the range. primarily through rivers cutting deep valleys through the igneous and sedimentary rocks.

The geologic boundaries of the coast range formation extend from southwest Washington state in the north to around the Coquille River in the south where the older and taller Klamath Mountains begin. In the east the mountains begin as foothills forming the western edge of the Willamette Valley and continue west to the coastline and beyond where the basalt formation tapers off into the continental shelf and ends at the continental slope with several banks and basins off shore.

Physiographically, they are a section of the larger Pacific Border province, which in turn are part of the larger Pacific Mountain System physiographic division.

== Climate ==
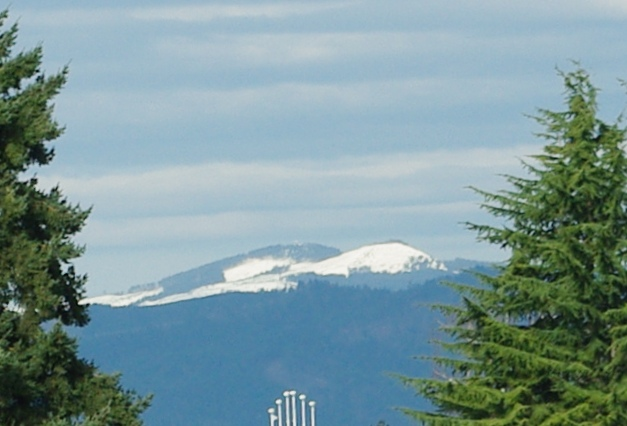
Snow on South Saddle Mountain

A mild maritime climate prevails throughout the range with temperature and precipitation varying due to elevation and distance from the coastline. Characteristics of the climate include cool dry summers followed by mild and wet winters. The majority of precipitation accumulates in the form of rain, with snow during the winter months at the higher elevations, but no permanent snow pack. Annual precipitation differs from 60 inches (1,500 mm) in some parts to up to 120 in (3,000 mm), with the higher amounts coming in the higher elevations.

The average high temperature in January is 36.3 °F (2.4 °C), and the average high in July is 61.9 °F (16.6 °C) with temperatures also varying by elevation. The further inland and the more southerly portions have a more Mediterranean climate that is more similar to the climate of the Willamette Valley. The Coast Range creates a rain shadow effect by forcing moisture laden clouds to rise by expelling moisture. This shields the Willamette Valley and causes a less maritime climate with hotter summers and less precipitation than the Oregon Coast.

== Sections ==
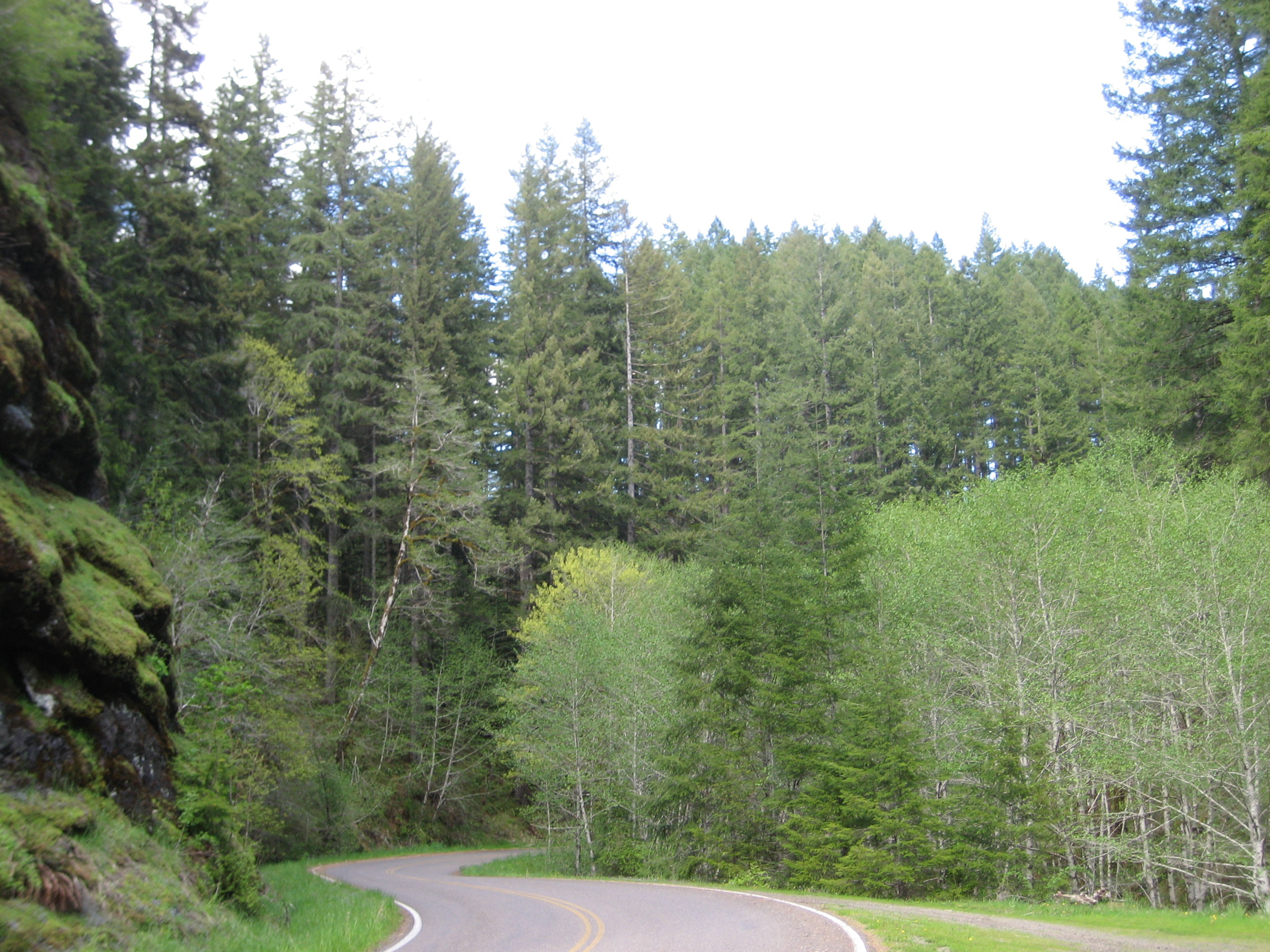
Road through the Northern section showing the mix of deciduous and coniferous trees

The Oregon Coast Range is divided into three separate sections: North, Central, and South. In the south is the oldest portion of the range, with formation beginning in the Paleocene era with the Roseburg volcanics, while the newest section is the northernmost portion, formed first with the Siletz River Volcanics. The Central and Northern sections contain more sedimentary rocks from the mud, silt, sand, and other volcanic debris than the lower Southern section.

=== North ===
Located in the northwest portion of Oregon this section of the range has peaks as high as 3,706 feet (1,130 m) for Rogers Peak. Forests here are considered to be some of the most productive timber land in the world. Trees include primarily Sitka spruce, western redcedar, Douglas-fir, and western hemlock. Other plants include huckleberry, salmonberry, salal, vine maple, Oregon grape, bracken fern, and thimble-berry among others. The northern boundary is the Columbia River, with some mountainous features on the north side of the river, and continues south for approximately 100 miles (160 km) to the Salmon River where Oregon Route 18 crosses the range from the Willamette Valley to the Oregon Coast with width roughly 35 mi (60 km).

=== Central ===
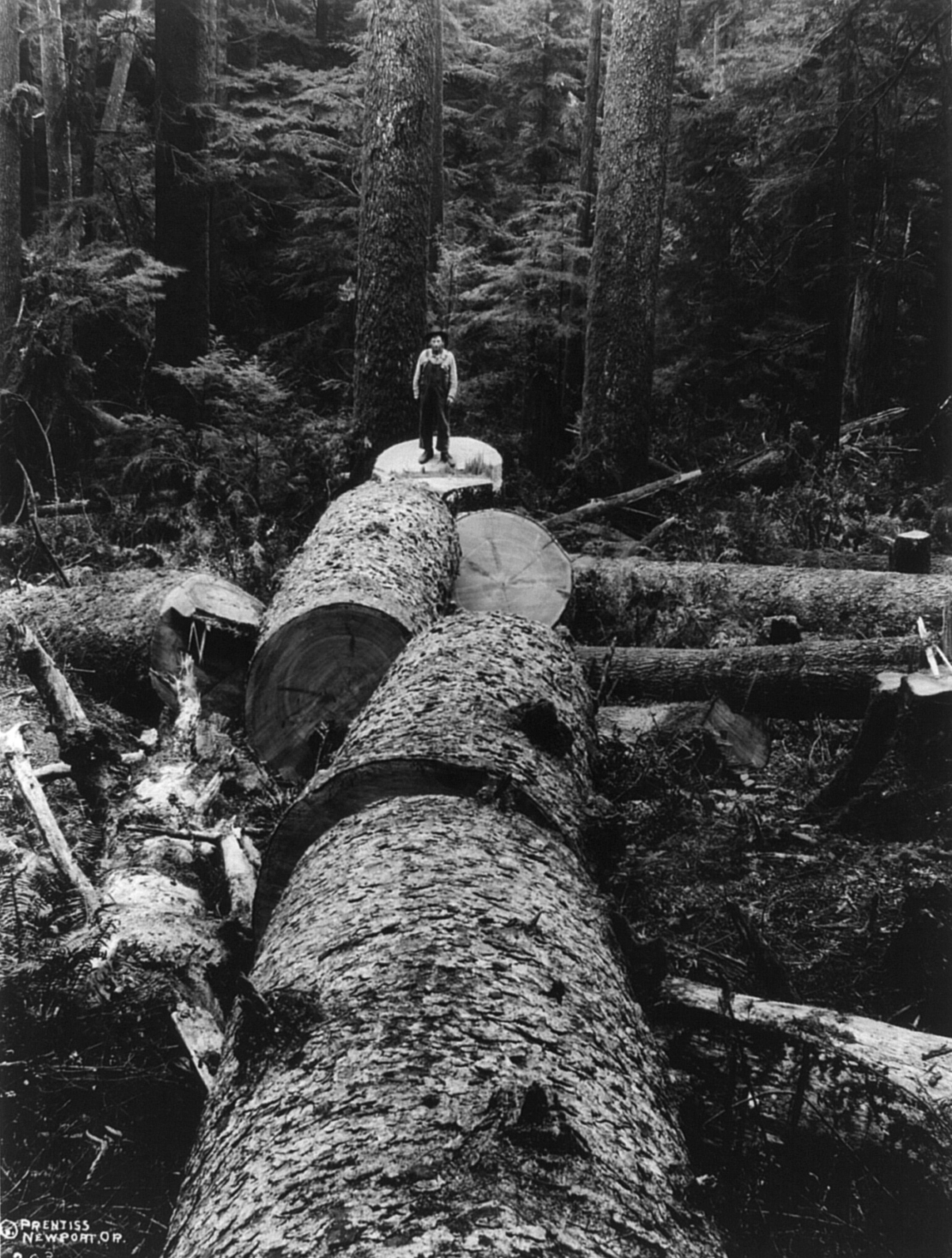
A Sitka spruce tree logged near Newport in 1918

Located between the Salmon River and the Umpqua River on the north and south, the Central range is bounded by the Willamette Valley on the east and the Pacific Ocean to the west. This mountain range, approximately 90 mi (140 km) long, contains mountains as high as 4,097 ft (1,248 m) for Marys Peak. Portions of the range are inside the Siuslaw National Forest along with three designated wilderness areas: Drift Creek Wilderness, Cummins Creek Wilderness and the Rock Creek Wilderness. Larger animals that live in these sections include deer, elk, bobcat, and bear. Bear are black bear while deer are mule and black-tailed deer species. Other mammals here are mountain beaver, beavers, coyote, mink, river otter, mountain lion, porcupines, skunks, and brush rabbit.

=== South ===
The southernmost section of the Coast Range is located in the southwest portion of Oregon between the middle fork of the Coquille River in the south and the Umpqua River on the north. Oregon Route 38 is the general divide between the Central and Southern portions of the Coast Range. Approximately 55 mi (90 km) long, the section contains mountains as high as 3,547 ft (1,081 m) for Bone Mountain. On the south the Coquille River’s middle fork provides the general dividing line between the Central Range and the Klamath Mountains to the south and east.

Birds living in the Southern Coast Range include a variety of smaller and larger bird species. Species include peregrine falcons, pileated woodpeckers, olive-sided flycatcher, and western bluebirds among others. The threatened northern spotted owl also inhabit the mountain forests. Animal life in the rivers, streams, and lakes include lamprey, coastal cutthroat trout, dace, Umpqua chub, frogs, salamander, turtles, coho salmon, steelhead trout, and others.

== Peaks ==
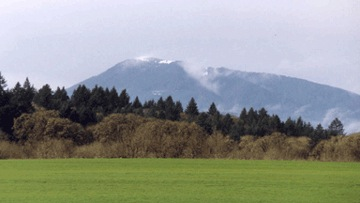
Marys Peak

Five tallest peaks in the Oregon Coast Range:

- Marys Peak, 4,101 feet
- Rogers Peak, 3,706 feet
- Grass Mountain, 3,615 feet, 44°25′25.99″N 123°40′25.46″W
- Laurel Mountain, 3,592 feet, 44°55′23.85″N 123°34′23.51″W
- Bone Mountain, 3,547 feet

== Rivers ==
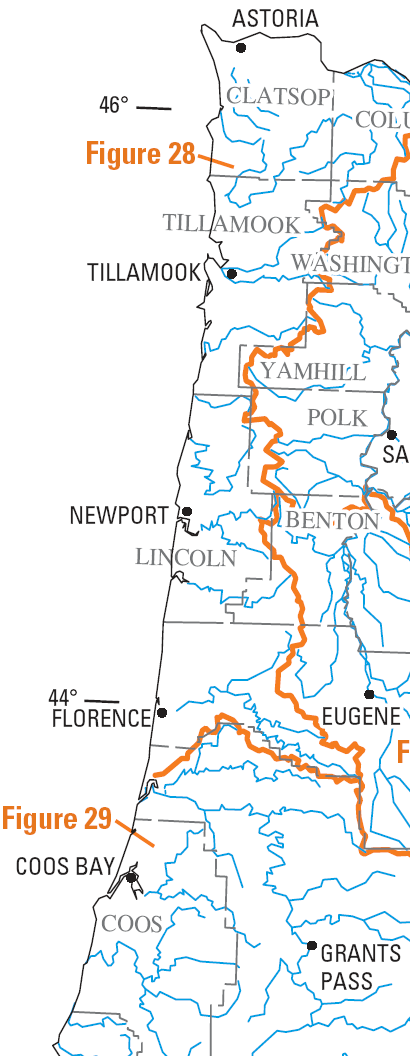
Map of the region with major rivers in blue; orange line shows divide between watersheds

The following rivers have their headwaters in the Oregon Coast Range:

- Drains to Pacific Ocean:
  - Alsea River
  - Coos River
  - Coquille River
  - D River
  - Kilchis River
  - Little Nestucca River
  - Miami River
  - Necanicum River
  - Nehalem River
  - Nestucca River
  - Salmonberry River
  - Salmon River
  - Siletz River
  - Siltcoos River
  - Siuslaw River
  - Smith River
  - Tillamook River
  - Trask River
  - Umpqua River
  - Wilson River
  - Yachats River
  - Yaquina River

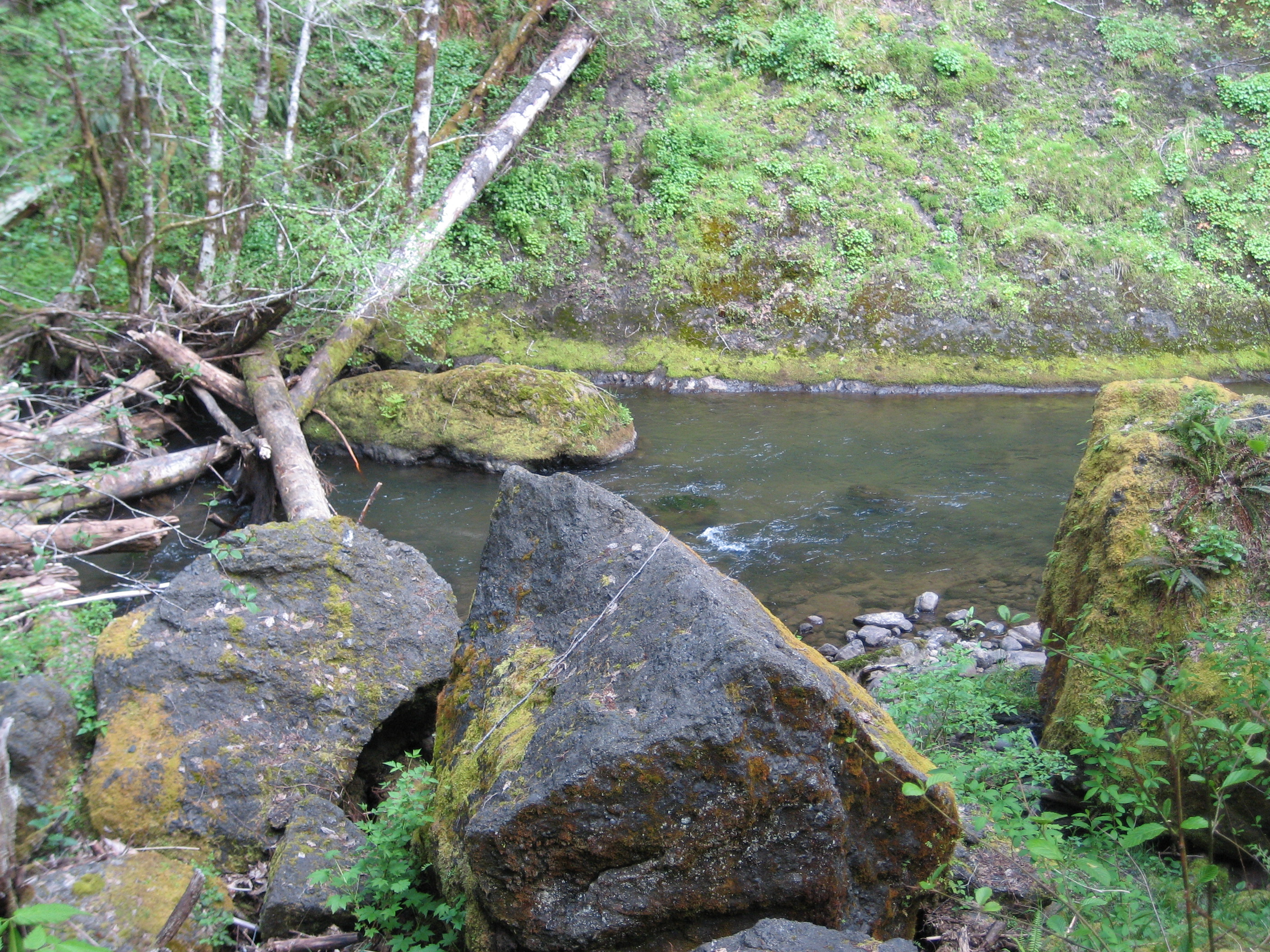
Nestucca River in the Northern range

- Drains to Columbia River:
  - Clatskanie River
  - John Day River
  - Klaskanine River
  - Lewis and Clark River
  - Skipanon River
  - Wallooskee River
  - Youngs River
- Drains to Willamette River:
  - Coast Fork Willamette River
  - Long Tom River
  - Luckiamute River
  - Marys River
  - Tualatin River
  - Yamhill River

== See also ==
- Coast Range (ecoregion)
