= Lees Camp, Oregon =

Unincorporated community in the state of Oregon, United States

Lees Camp
- Unincorporated community
- Location within the state of Oregon Lees Camp (the United States)
- Coordinates: 45°35′38″N 123°32′25″W
- Country: United States
- State: Oregon
- County: Tillamook
- Elevation: 610 ft (190 m)
- Time zone: UTC-8 (Pacific (PST))
  - Summer (DST): UTC-7 (PDT)
- GNIS feature ID: 1123027

Lees Camp (also Lee's Camp) is an unincorporated community in Tillamook County, Oregon, United States. It is along Oregon Route 6 about 25 miles (40 km) northeast of Tillamook at the confluence of the Wilson River and North Fork Wilson River, surrounded by the Tillamook State Forest. It is near the summit of the Northern Oregon Coast Range.

== History ==
Lees Camp was established by Rex Lee, who in 1939 bought 16 acres (6.5 ha) of land on the Wilson River near the mouth of the North Fork from the Reeher family. Lee developed the place as a tourist and sportsmen's camp called Lee's Wilson River Camp. In 1947, a post office with the name Lee's Camp was established. It was nearly in the same location as an earlier post office named Wilson, which ran from 1896 to 1917, with mail to Gales Creek. Wilson post office served the Glenora station of the United States Weather Bureau. The name Glenora was unacceptable to the Post Office Department for the name of the post office because of possible confusion with places such as Glenwood and Glendale. Lee's Camp post office closed in 1977; the community is now served by the Tillamook post office.

The Lees Camp Store, founded in the 1930s, serves as a travelers' landmark and focal point for area residents.

As of October 2010, Lees Camp holds the record for most rainfall in 24 hours in Oregon: 14.3 inches (363 mm) on November 6, 2006. As of 1956, Glenora held the previous state 24-hour rainfall record of 10.17 inches (258.3 mm) on December 21, 1915.
