= Saddle Mountain State Natural Area =

State parkin the Coast Range of Oregon, US

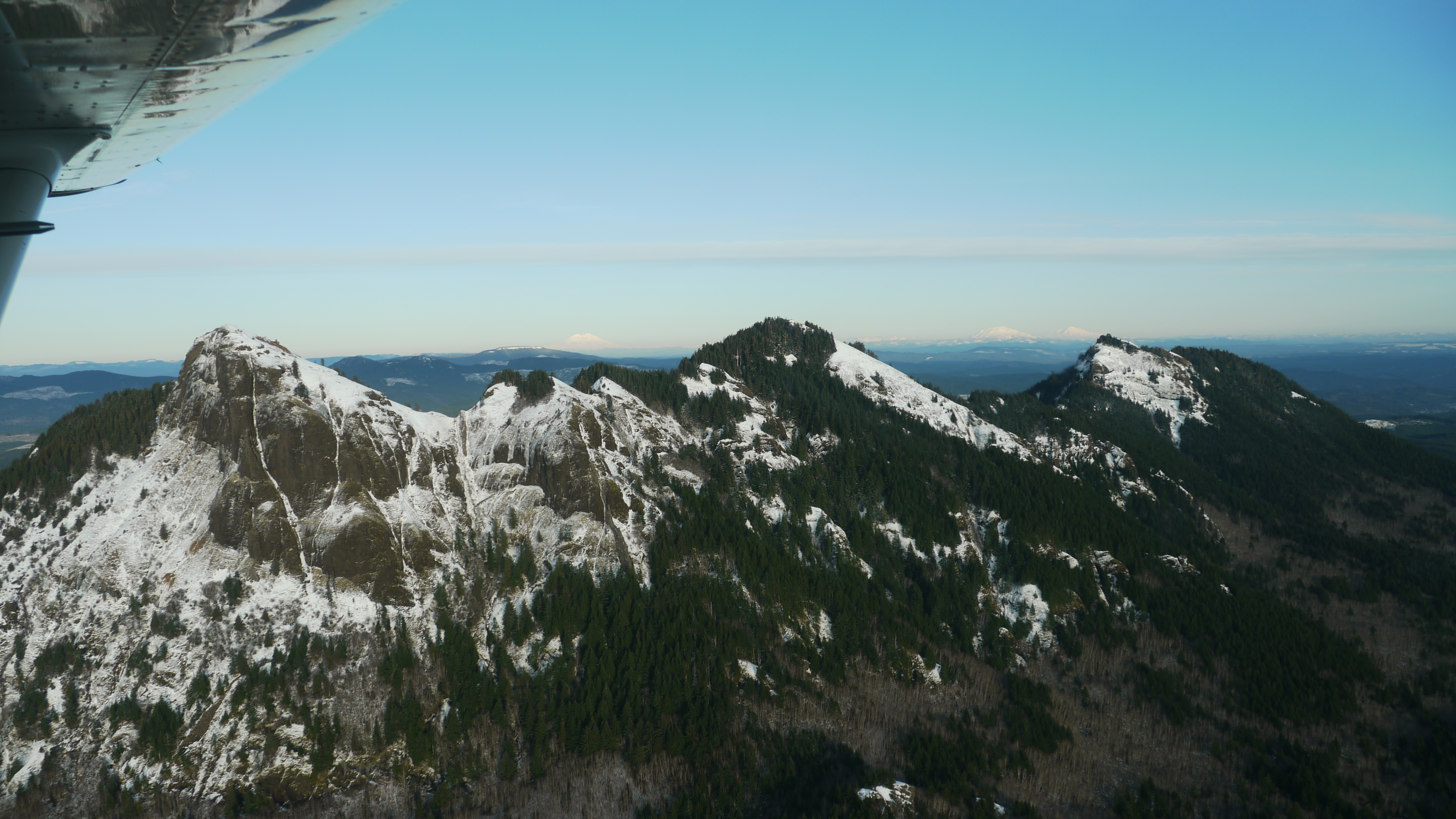
- Saddle Mountain

- Location within Oregon Location within the United States
- Type: Public, state
- Location: Clatsop County, Oregon, United States
- Nearest city: Seaside
- Coordinates: 45°57′58″N 123°41′10″W
- Operator: Oregon Parks and Recreation Department

Saddle Mountain State Natural Area is a state park in northwest Oregon. It is located in the Northern Oregon Coast Range in central Clatsop County, about 20 miles (32 km) by road from Seaside. A 2.5-mile (4.0 km) long hiking trail climbs to the top of Saddle Mountain, which is located in the park. On clear days, the Pacific Ocean, Columbia River mouth and several of the Cascade mountains in Washington and Oregon can be seen from the summit.

== History ==
Oregon's State Land Board was given 1,402 acres (567 ha) by the federal government on August 11, 1916, to be set aside for use as a park around Saddle Mountain. On November 21, 1928, the state highway commission, who at that time operated Oregon's state parks, received 1,280 acres (520 ha) as a gift from Nellie and O. W. Taylor to use for a park. This was the first land incorporated into what was originally known as Saddle Mountain State Park.

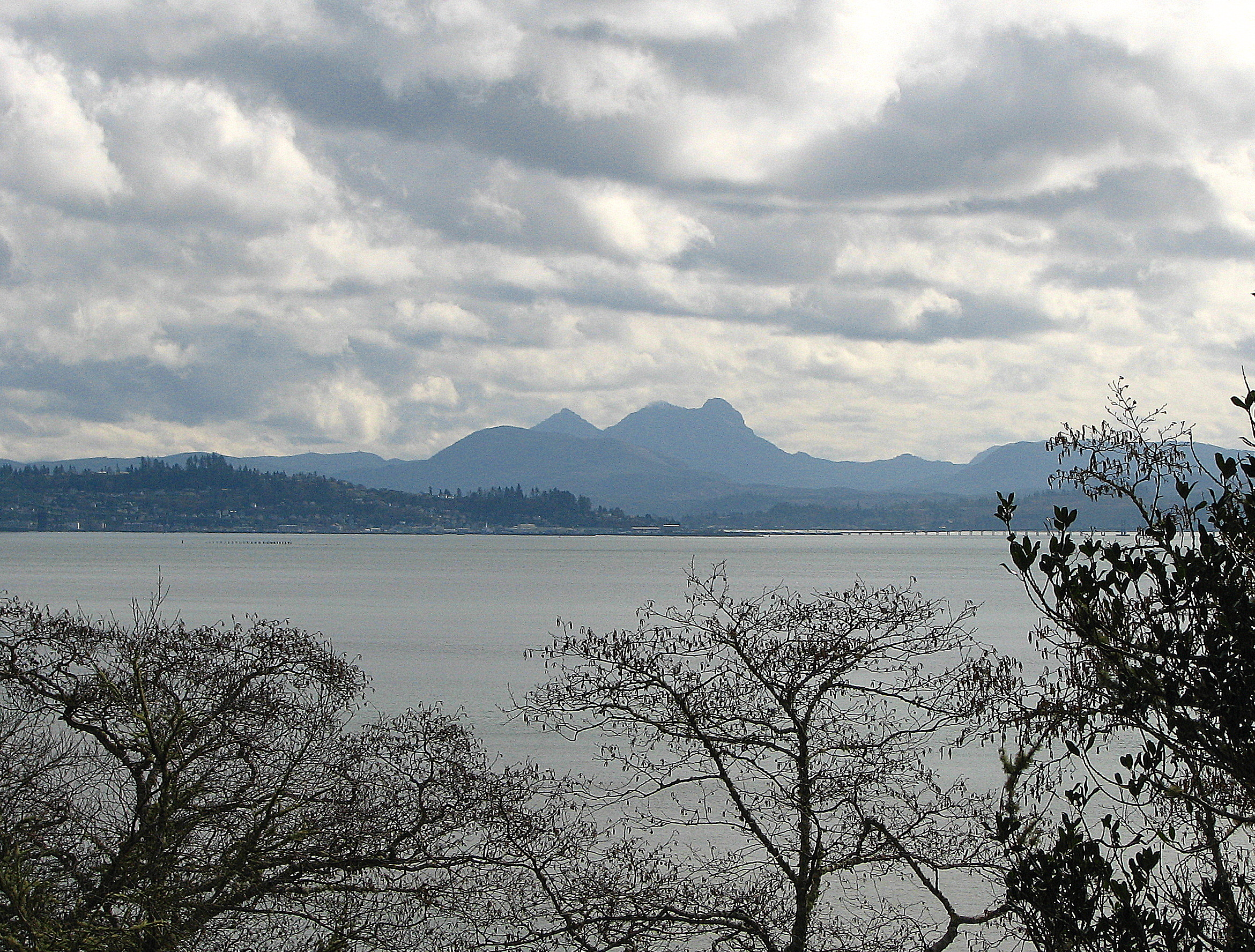
A view of Saddle Mountain

During the Great Depression, of the 1930s, the park was the site of a Civilian Conservation Corps (CCC) camp. The state leased the land to the federal government for two years starting in June 1935. During their stay at the park, the CCC made improvements including building the main trail to the top of the mountain, constructing a 7.25 miles (11.67 km) road from the Sunset Highway to the main parking lot, the parking lot itself, a picnic area, and restrooms.

On December 5, 1935, the Oregon State Land Board donated the 1,402 acres (567 ha) they received from the federal government to the state highway commission, as they felt the parks division could better manage the land. This new land, which already been logged, was incorporated into the park. Forest fires burned through many of the trees near the base of the mountain in 1936 and again in 1939. The state built an overnight camping area, a Quonset hut, and a water system complete with reservoir in 1948.

The Oregon State Board of Forestry built a fire lookout tower on the summit of Saddle Mountain in 1953. By 1964, the state had bought five tracts of land totaling 372 acres (151 ha) and added them to the park, bringing the total to 3,054 acres (1,236 ha). By 1997 the park had been renamed Saddle Mountain State Natural Area.

== Details ==
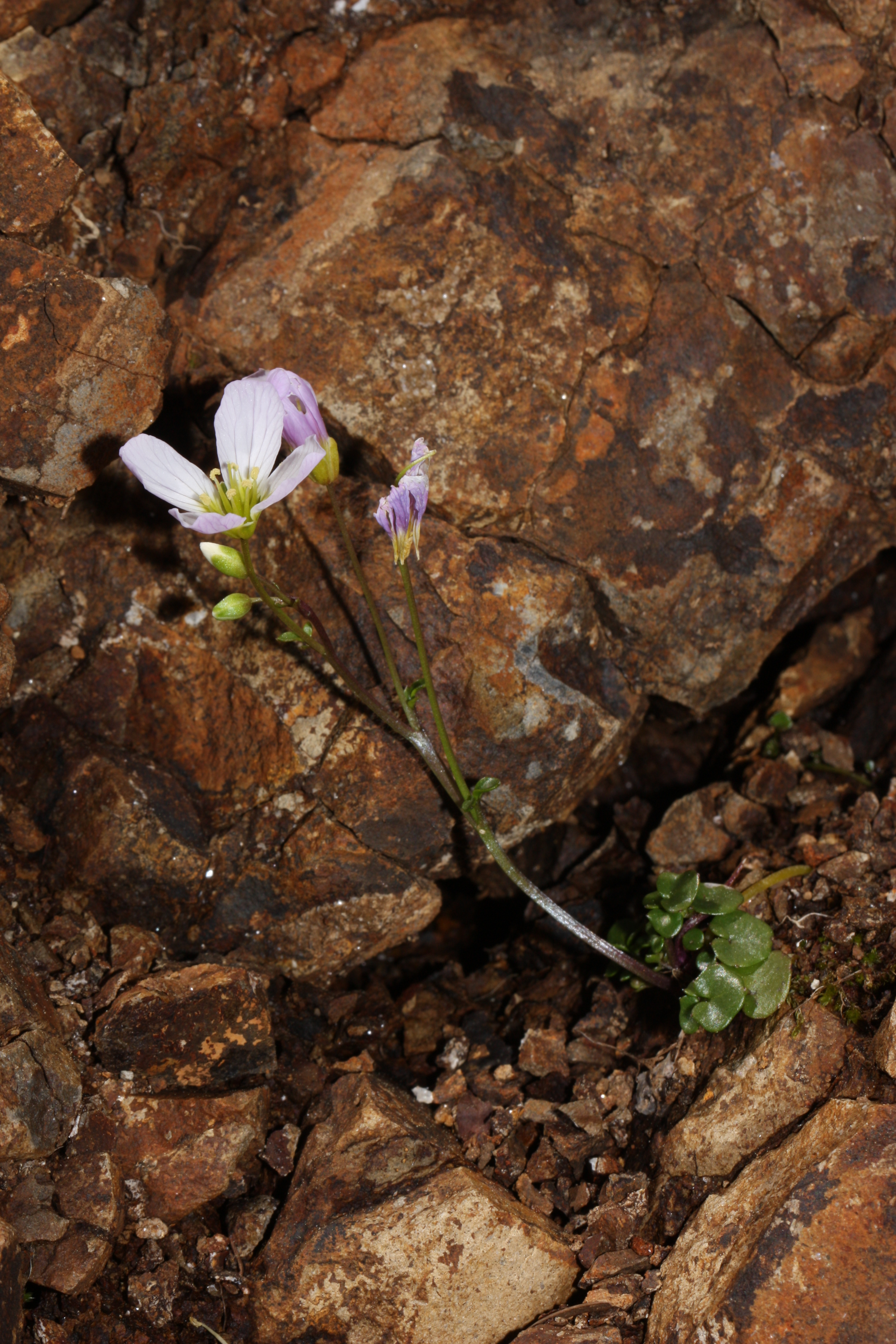
Cardamine pattersonii is endemic to Saddle Mountain and Onion Peak, 15 miles (24 km) southwest.

Saddle Mountain Road intercepts U.S. Route 26 eight miles (13 km) east of Necanicum Junction where Oregon Route 53 meets Route 26. A primary feature of the park is 3,283-foot (1,001 m) tall Saddle Mountain. From the top of the peak, on clear days, mountains in the Cascade Range far to the east can be seen, as well as the Pacific Ocean to the west and the mouth of the Columbia River to the north. Amenities at the park include primitive campsites, restrooms, trails, and picnic facilities. The campground is closed from October 31 to March 1.

Natural features in the park include forests and a year-round spring near summit of the mountain. Tree species include cedar, hemlock, and spruce. Other flora include the rare Cardamine pattersonii. A herd of elk have been seen in the park.
