= Tillamook Bay =

Bay in Oregon, USA

Coordinates: 45°31′32″N 123°55′09″W

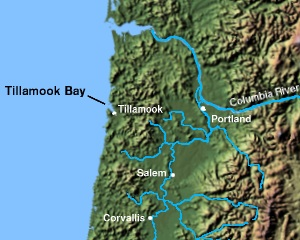
Tillamook Bay on the Oregon Coast

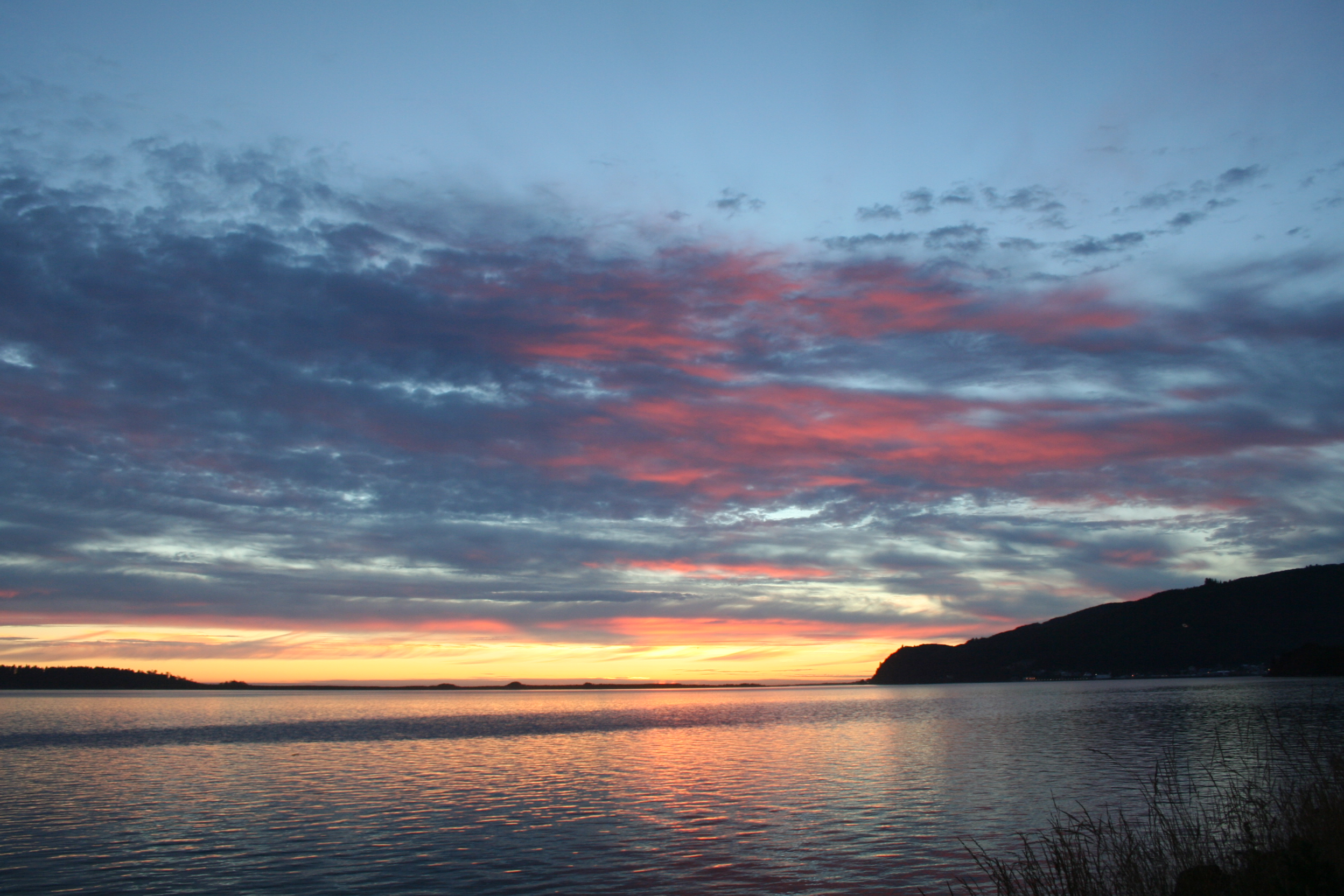
Sunset over Tillamook Bay from US 101

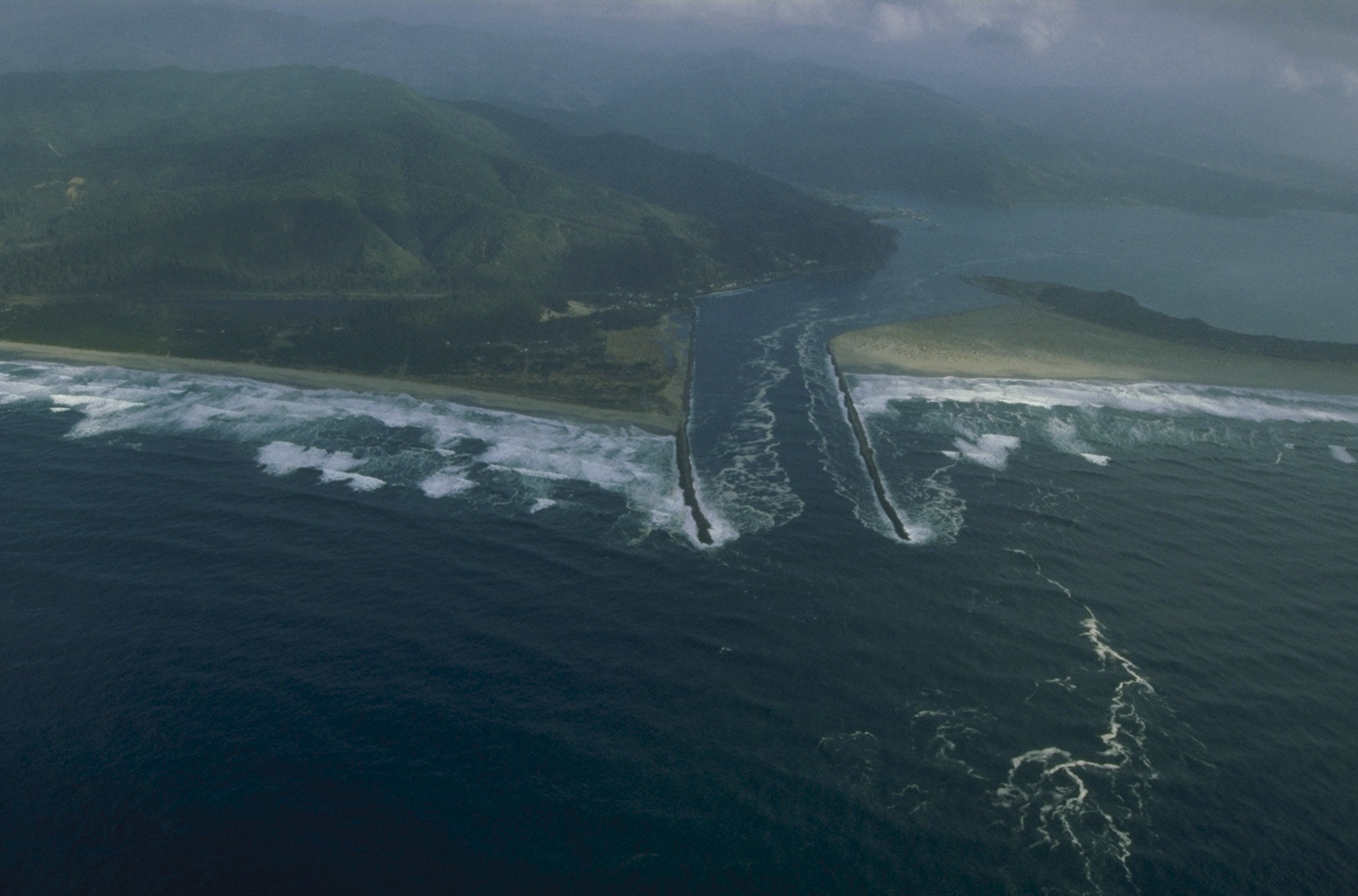
The outlet of Tillamook Bay on the Pacific Ocean

Tillamook Bay is a small inlet of the Pacific Ocean, approximately 6 mi (10 km) long and 2 mi (3 km) wide, on the northwest coast of the U.S. state of Oregon. It is located just north of Cape Meares in western Tillamook County approximately 75 mi (120 km) west of Portland.

== Description and history ==
The bay is protected from the open ocean by shoals and a 3 mi (5 km) sandbar called the Bayocean Peninsula. It is surrounded closely by the Coastal Range except at its southeast end, where the town of Tillamook sits near the mouths of the Kilchis, Wilson, Trask and Tillamook rivers, which flow quickly down from the surrounding timber-producing regions of the Coastal Range to converge at the bay. The short Miami River enters the north end of the bay. The small fishing village of Garibaldi sits near the cliffs opening of the bay in the ocean. The rivers that feed the bay are known for their prolific steelhead and salmon runs. The mixing of freshwater from the rivers with the ocean's saltwater makes the bay an estuary.

The name "Tillamook" is Coast Salish word meaning "The many people of the Nehelim", as opposed to the popular belief of its meaning as "The land of many waters". At the time of the arrival of Europeans, the area along the coast was inhabited by the Tillamook and other related Coast Salish tribes. Historians believe they entered the area around the year 1400 and Lewis and Clark estimated the population south of the Columbia River along the coast at approximately 2,200.

The first American at Tillamook Bay was Captain Robert Gray who in August, 1788 arrived and explored the surrounding area. He was the first known American to set foot on Oregon shore. Gray at first thought he had landed at the Columbia River, but after discovering his mistake and a hostile encounter with the local natives, where one of Gray's crew and several natives were killed, he left the area after one week's stay.

The bay was settled in 1848 by Elbridge Trask, who journeyed overland to the bay, and subsequent trials of early settlement were described in the 1960 historical novel Trask by Don Berry. The novel and two sequels are collectively known as the "Trask novels".

In 1911 an Oregon Municipal corporation called the Port of Bayocean was formed by a special election to manage land at the entrance to the bay. During World War II, the United States Navy operated blimp patrol station near the bay at Naval Air Station Tillamook. The station was decommissioned in 1948. In 1953 the Port of Bayocean acquired the former station and began operating it as the Port of Tillamook Bay. A 5.5 mi (9 km) railroad spur, originally built by the Navy, connects the coastal communities along the bay to the Southern Pacific Railroad at Tillamook. In 2003, an employee of the Port of Tillamook Bay started a heritage railroad to display the coastal beauty. This railroad was named the Oregon Coast Scenic Railroad which operates passenger trains on the 13 miles between Garibaldi, OR and Wheeler, OR. In 2017, a touring company called Oregon Coast Railriders makes use of 6 miles of The Port of Tillamook Bay Rail Road (originally known as the Pacific Railway), where visitors peddle a multi-person cycle-transport that runs on the rails. The bay is within easy driving distance of Portland and is one of the most popular gateways to the Oregon Coast. Planning and slow and steady progress are underway with The Salmonberry Trail, which intends to eventually connect four coastal towns, with passage through the Coastal Mountain Range to Banks, OR; hiking, biking, and horseriding would be possible on this route. The town of Tillamook is the location of the famous Tillamook Cheese Factory.

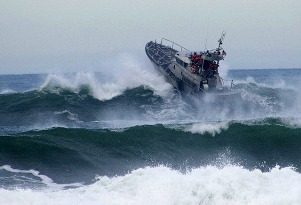
Waves can be dangerous off Tillamook Bay.

The stone breakwater at the mouth of Tillamook Bay is only 400 meters wide. During heavy weather the waves off the harbor entrance can be 10 metres (33 ft) high, making entering the harbor dangerous. During the July 4th weekend of 1980 Richard Dixon, the United States Coast Guard coxswain of a 44-foot Motor Lifeboat, led two daring rescues off the Tillamook Bay breakwater, for which he was awarded two Coast Guard Medals.

== See also ==
- Nestucca Bay
- Tillamook Head
