= Trask River =

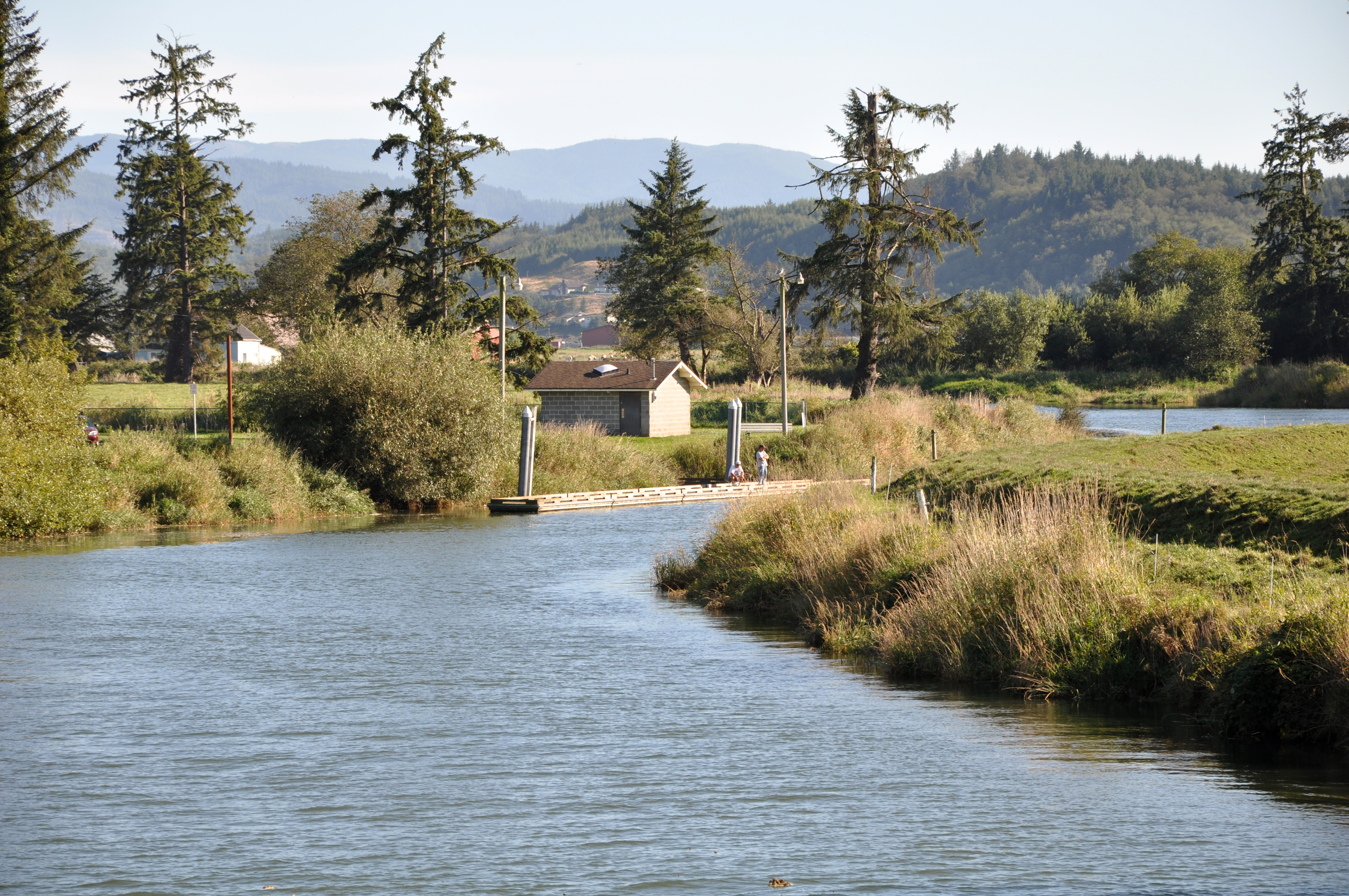
- Trask River from Oregon Route 131 bridge at Tillamook

- Location of the mouth of the Trask River in Oregon

Location
- Country: United States
- State: Oregon
- County: Tillamook County

Physical characteristics
- Source: Northern Oregon Coast Range
  - location: Tillamook State Forest, East of Tillamook
  - coordinates: 45°26′23″N 123°36′41″W
  - elevation: 281 ft (86 m)
- Mouth: Tillamook Bay
  - location: Oregon
  - coordinates: 45°28′13″N 123°52′57″W
  - elevation: 3 ft (0.91 m)
- Length: 18 mi (29 km)
- Basin size: 175 sq mi (450 km^{2})
- Discharge
  - location: 10.95 miles (17.62 km) from the mouth
  - average: 989 cu ft/s (28.0 m^{3}/s)
  - minimum: 49 cu ft/s (1.4 m^{3}/s)
  - maximum: 25,800 cu ft/s (730 m^{3}/s)

The Trask River is in northwestern Oregon in the United States. It drains a mountainous timber-producing area of the Northern Oregon Coast Range west of Portland into Tillamook Bay and the Pacific Ocean. It is one of five rivers—the Tillamook, the Trask, the Wilson, the Kilchis, and the Miami—that flow into the bay.

The main stem of the river is 18 miles (29 km) long from where its two forks join at 45.439830°N 123.611505°W. The North Fork, 30 miles (48 km) long, rises in several forks itself in the Tillamook State Forest in western Washington County, west of Forest Grove, Oregon. It flows generally west into eastern Tillamook County. The South Fork, 10 miles (16 km) long, rises in southern Tillamook County at 45.3489972°N 123.6534486°W and flows generally northward.

The river is known for its runs of Steelhead and Chinook salmon.

The river is named for Elbridge Trask who settled on the shores of Tillamook Bay in 1848. Trask's overland journey was described in the 1960 historical novel Trask by Don Berry, as well as two sequels. The novels are collectively known as the "Trask novels."

== Course ==
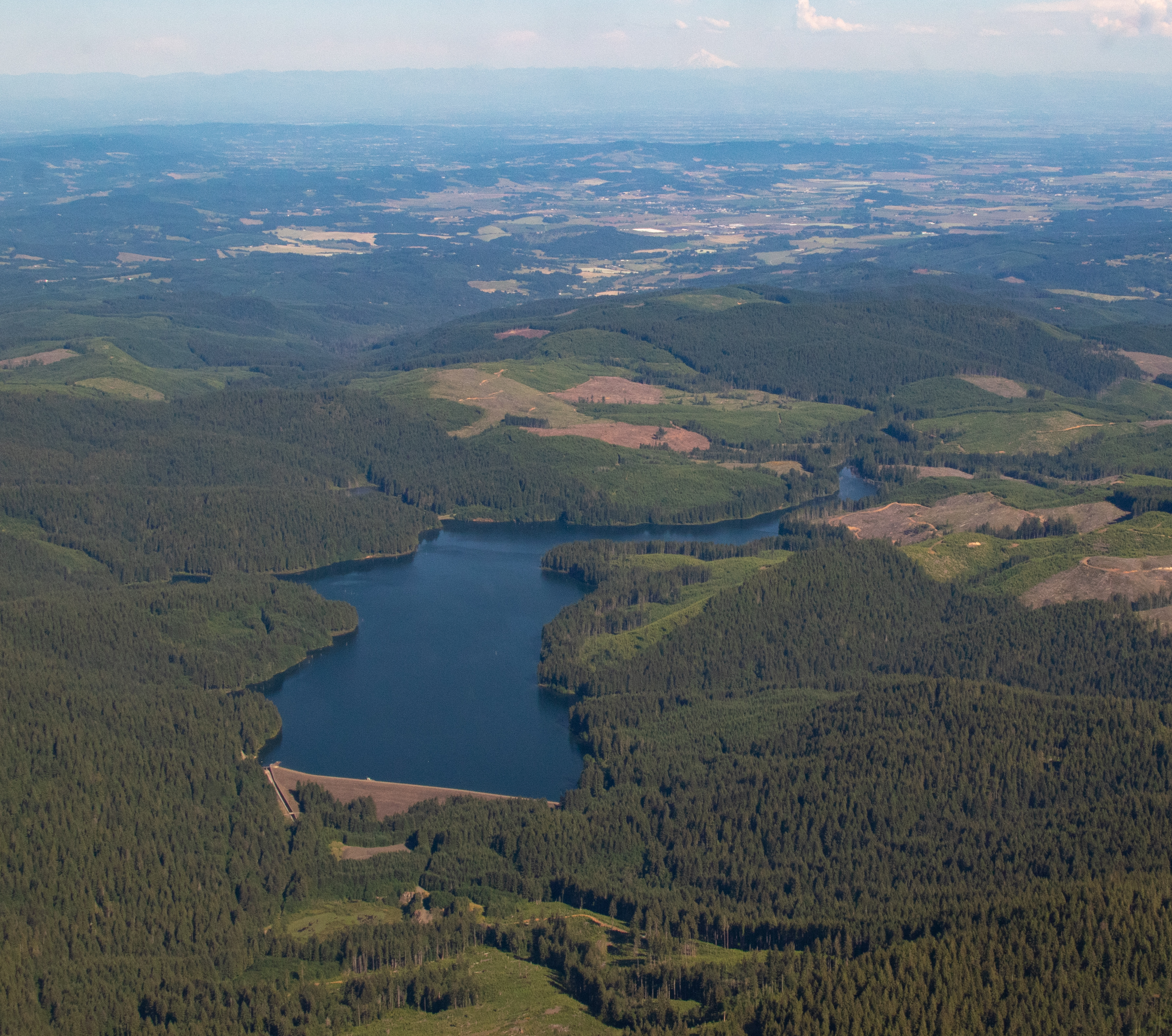
Barney Reservoir

The Trask River is formed by the confluence of North Fork Trask River and South Fork Trask River near Trask County Park in the Tillamook State Forest. It is paralleled for much of its length by Trask River Road. Flowing generally west, the river receives Rowe Creek from the left about 16 miles (26 km) from the mouth, then Samson Creek from the right about 1 mile (1.6 km) later. Over the next 4 miles (6.4 km) Burton, Blue Ridge, Hatchery, Trowbridge, Little Rock, and Panther creeks all enter from the right. The river passes a United States Geological Survey stream gauge at river mile (RM) 10.95 or river kilometer (RK) 17.62, just before receiving Cedar Creek from the right.

Thereafter, Gold and Hanenkrat creeks enter from the left and Green Creek from the right. The river receives Mill Creek from the left about 5 miles (8.0 km) from the mouth. About 1 mile (1.6 km) later, the stream passes under U.S. Route 101 and flows around the southwestern edge of Tillamook. Receiving Hoquarten and Nolan sloughs from the right, it merges with the Tillamook River and flows into Tillamook Bay near Memaloose Point.

=== Discharge ===
The United States Geological Survey (USGS) monitors the flow of the Trask River at a stream gauge 10.95 miles (17.62 km) inland from the mouth of the river. Based on data collected from April 1996 through 2008, the average flow at this gauge is 985 cubic feet per second (27.9 m^{3}/s). This is from a drainage area of 156 square miles (404 km^{2}), about 89 percent of the total Trask River watershed. The maximum flow recorded there was 22,500 cubic feet per second (640 m^{3}/s) on November 25, 1999, and the minimum flow was 49 cubic feet per second (1.4 m^{3}/s) on September 11, 2007.

== See also ==
- List of rivers of Oregon
