= Kilchis River =

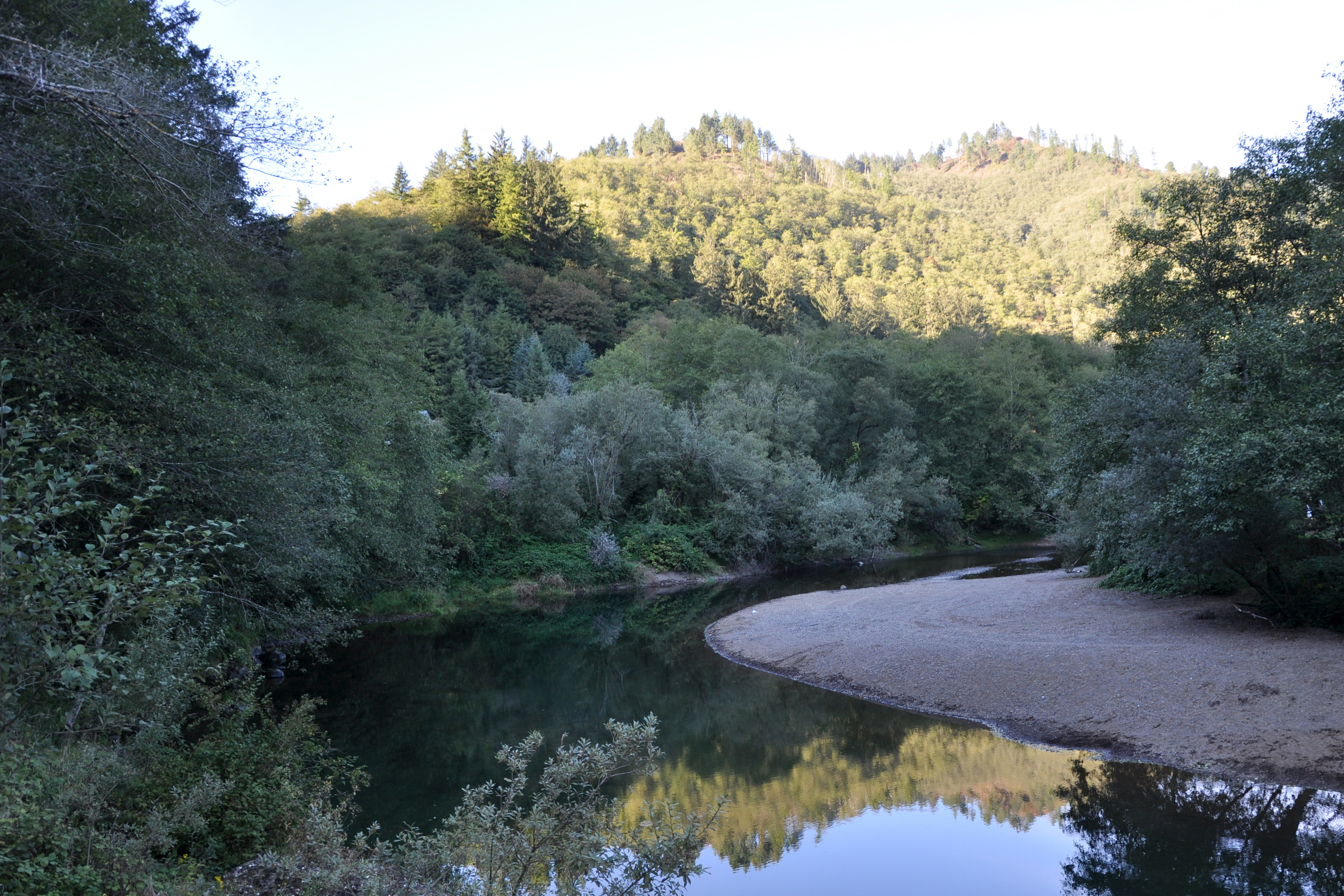
- Lower Kilchis River near Idaville

- Location of the mouth of the Kilchis River in Oregon

Location
- Country: United States
- State: Oregon
- County: Tillamook County

Physical characteristics
- Source: Northern Oregon Coast Range
  - location: East of Tillamook
  - coordinates: 45°36′15″N 123°45′14″W
  - elevation: 305 ft (93 m)
- Mouth: Tillamook Bay
  - location: Oregon
  - coordinates: 45°29′46″N 123°51′53″W
  - elevation: 13 ft (4.0 m)
- Length: 14 mi (23 km)
- Basin size: 65 sq mi (170 km^{2})
- Discharge
  - average: 422 cu ft/s (11.9 m^{3}/s)

The Kilchis River is a stream, about 14 miles (23 km) long, near the coast of northwest Oregon in the United States. It drains a mountainous timbered region of about 65 square miles (170 km^{2}) in the Northern Oregon Coast Range west of Portland.

The Kilchis River begins at the confluence of its North Fork and South Fork in northern Tillamook County in the Tillamook State Forest northeast of Bay City. It flows southwest, entering the southeast end of Tillamook Bay approximately 4 miles (6.4 km) northwest of the city of Tillamook. The mouth of the river is about 1 mile (1.6 km) north of the mouth of the Wilson River and about 2 miles (3.2 km) north of the mouth of the Trask River. It is one of five rivers—the Tillamook, the Trask, the Wilson, the Kilchis, and the Miami—that flow into the bay.

The river has good runs of steelhead and fall Chinook salmon. Because much of the land along the lower stretches is private, fishing is often done by drift boat launched from boat ramps at Kilchis County Park, County Park, and Mapes Creek. Anglers may also fish from stream banks on public land in the Tillamook State Forest.

The Kilchis River was named for the 19th century Tillamook leader Chief Kilchis, whose Tillamook name was [gə́lšəs] or [gə́lčəs].

== Course ==
Starting at the confluence of the North Fork Kilchis River and the South Fork Kilchis River, the river flows generally southwest through the Tillamook State Forest near Kilchis River Road. Sharp Creek enters from the right at about 9 miles (14 km) from the mouth and just upstream of Kilchis River County Park, which is on the right. Shortly thereafter, School Creek and Washout Creek enters from the right and Little South Fork Kilchis River from the left. Below this, the river receives Clear Creek from the left at about river mile (RM) 6 or river kilometer (RK) 9.7. Thereafter, Myrtle Creek and Murphy Creek enter from the right, and the river passes under U.S. Route 101 before entering Tillamook Bay near Idaville.

== Reserve ==
The Tillamook County Pioneer Museum owns Kilchis Point Reserve, about 200 acres (81 ha) of land along Tillamook Bay. The reserve has about 2 miles (3 km) of interpretive trails related to the site's Native American and pioneer heritage as well as its flora and fauna. The largest Native American village on the North Oregon Coast was located here as was the home of the first white settler, Joe Champion, who arrived in 1851.

== See also ==
- List of rivers of Oregon
