= Saddle Mountain (Clatsop County, Oregon) =

Mountain in Clatsop County, Oregon, USA

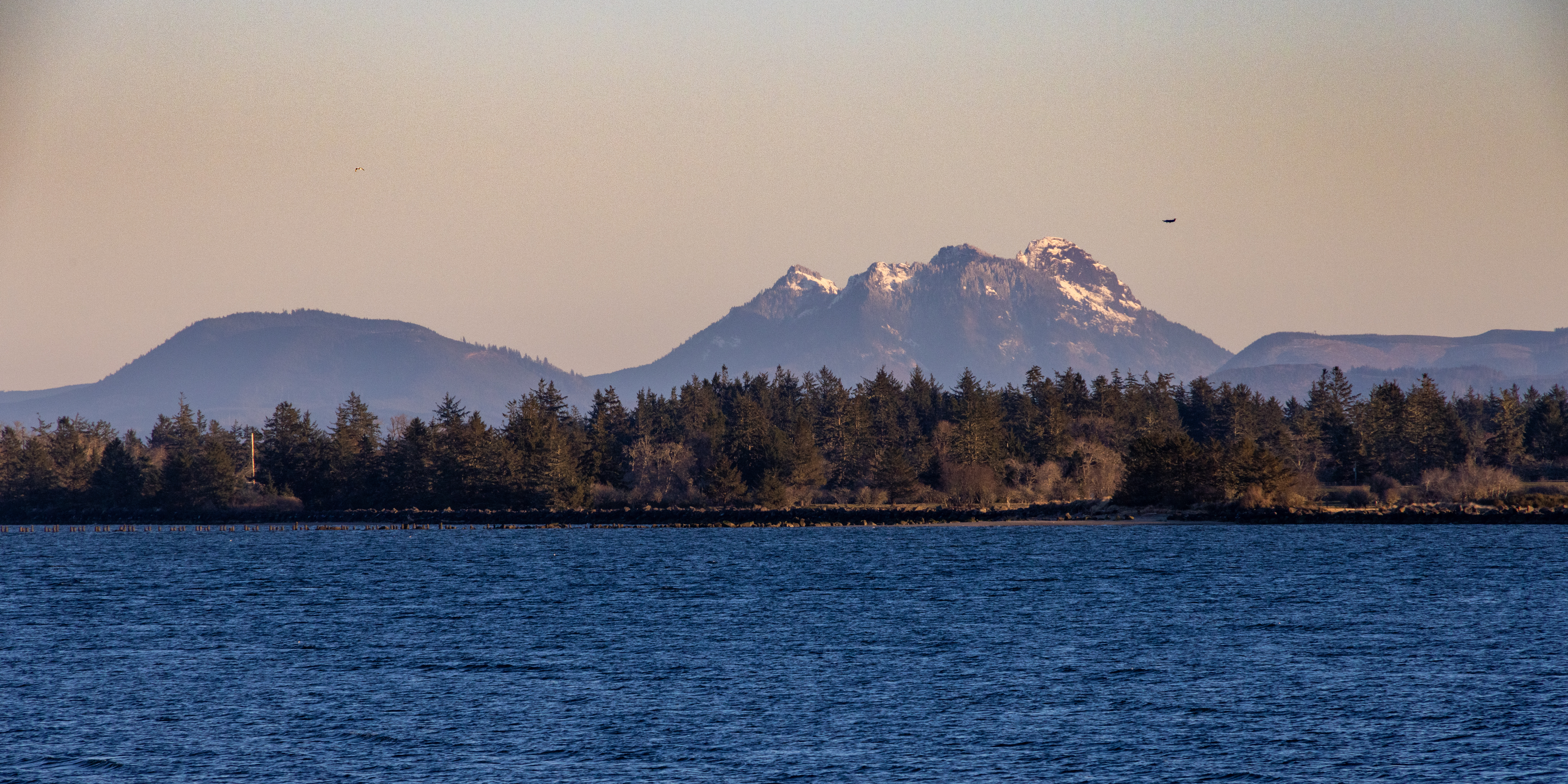

Highest point
- Elevation: 3,288 ft (1,002 m) NAVD 88
- Prominence: 2,323 ft (708 m)
- Listing: Oregon county high points
- Coordinates: 45°58′09″N 123°41′07″W

Geography
- Location within Oregon
- Location: Clatsop County, Oregon, U.S.
- Parent range: Northern Oregon Coast Range
- Topo map: USGS Saddle Mountain

Climbing
- First ascent: 1841 by James Dwight Dana
- Easiest route: Trailhead from state park

Saddle Mountain is the tallest mountain in Clatsop County in the U.S. state of Oregon. Part of the Oregon Coast Range, Saddle Mountain is in Saddle Mountain State Natural Area in the northwest corner of Oregon. The peak is listed on Oregon's Register of Natural Heritage Resources.

== Geology ==
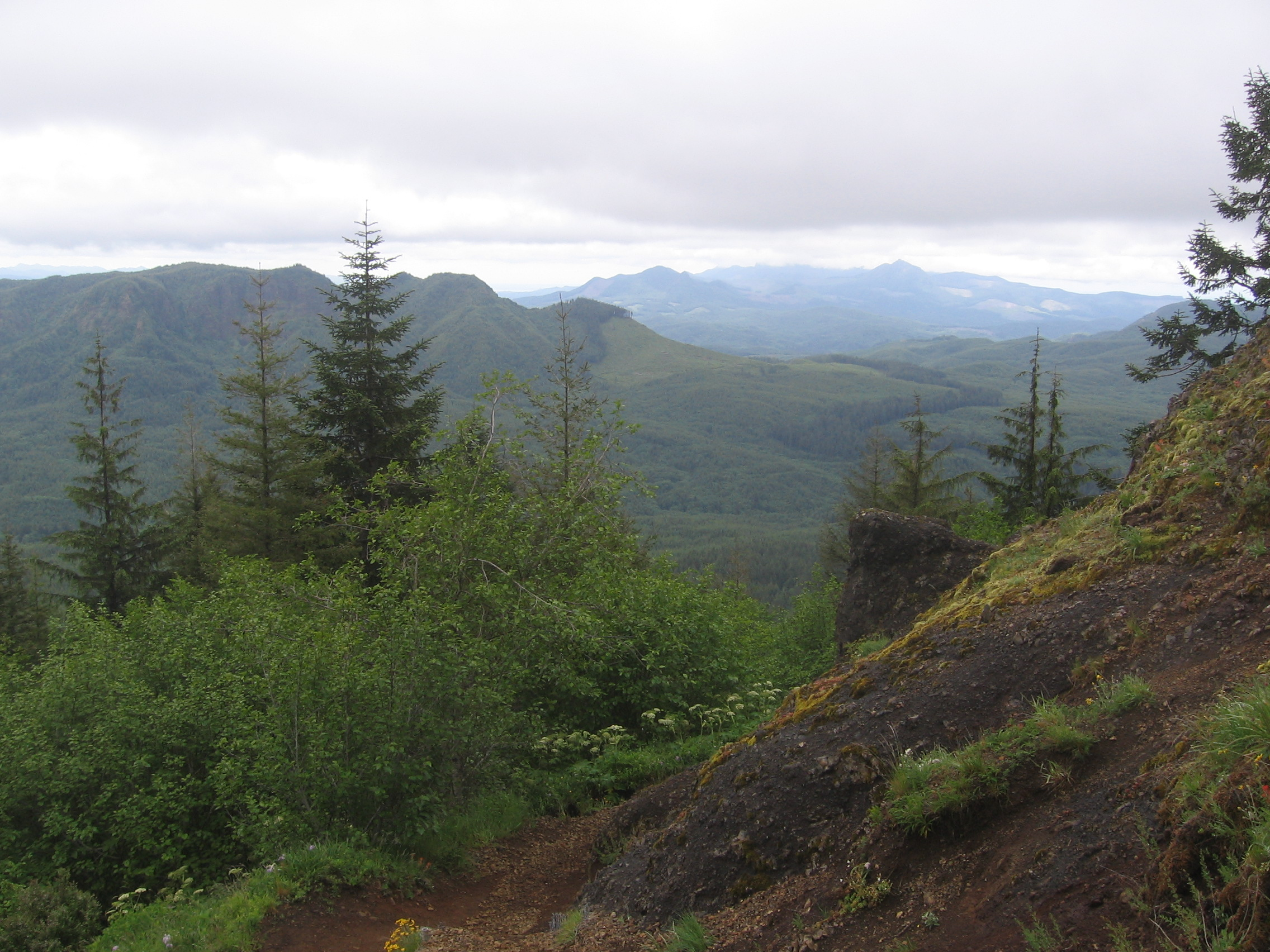
A view from the Saddle Mountain trail.

Saddle Mountain was created around 15 million years ago in the Miocene epoch when lava flows poured down the old Columbia River valley. When the lava encountered the water at the Astoria Sea, great steam explosions and thermal shocks occurred to create a large pile of basalt rocks. The mountain consists of this volcanic breccia, which is a rock made up of broken basalt fragments that are fused together in a fine-grained matrix.

== History ==
In modern time, the mountain has been viewed and described by a variety of European and American explorers. Beginning in 1788, these explorers included British captain John Meares, Lewis and Clark in 1805, and the Wilkes Expedition in 1841. Meares named the peak Mont de la Selle in 1788.

== Access ==
The hike to the taller of the two peaks is a 6-mile (9.7 km) round trip consisting of challenging terrain. Elevation gain is 1,603 feet (489 m) and leads to a 360-degree view to the Pacific Ocean, Cascade Mountain peaks such as Mount Hood, Mount St. Helens, Mount Rainier, Mount Adams, and other peaks in the Coast Range. The lower peak—elevation 3,200 feet (980 m)— to the east and south does not have trail access. The trail is steep at times along rock outcroppings, but does offer views that include wildflowers in bloom in the springtime. Beside the trailhead is a picnic area.

Saddle Mountain is 7 miles (11 km) off U.S. Route 26 about 65 miles (105 km) west of Portland. The access road to the mountain and state park is paved. The area contains dense forests of spruce and hemlock, and some ancient lava flows.

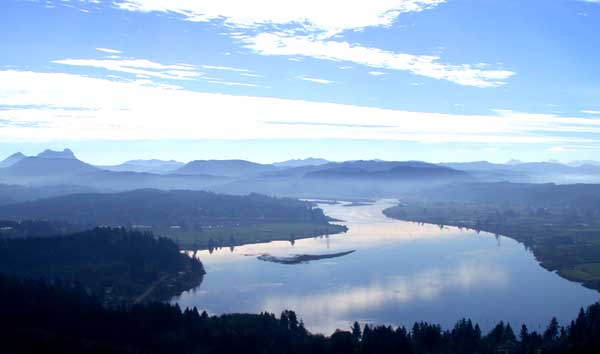
Saddle Mountain on the left overlooking Youngs River.

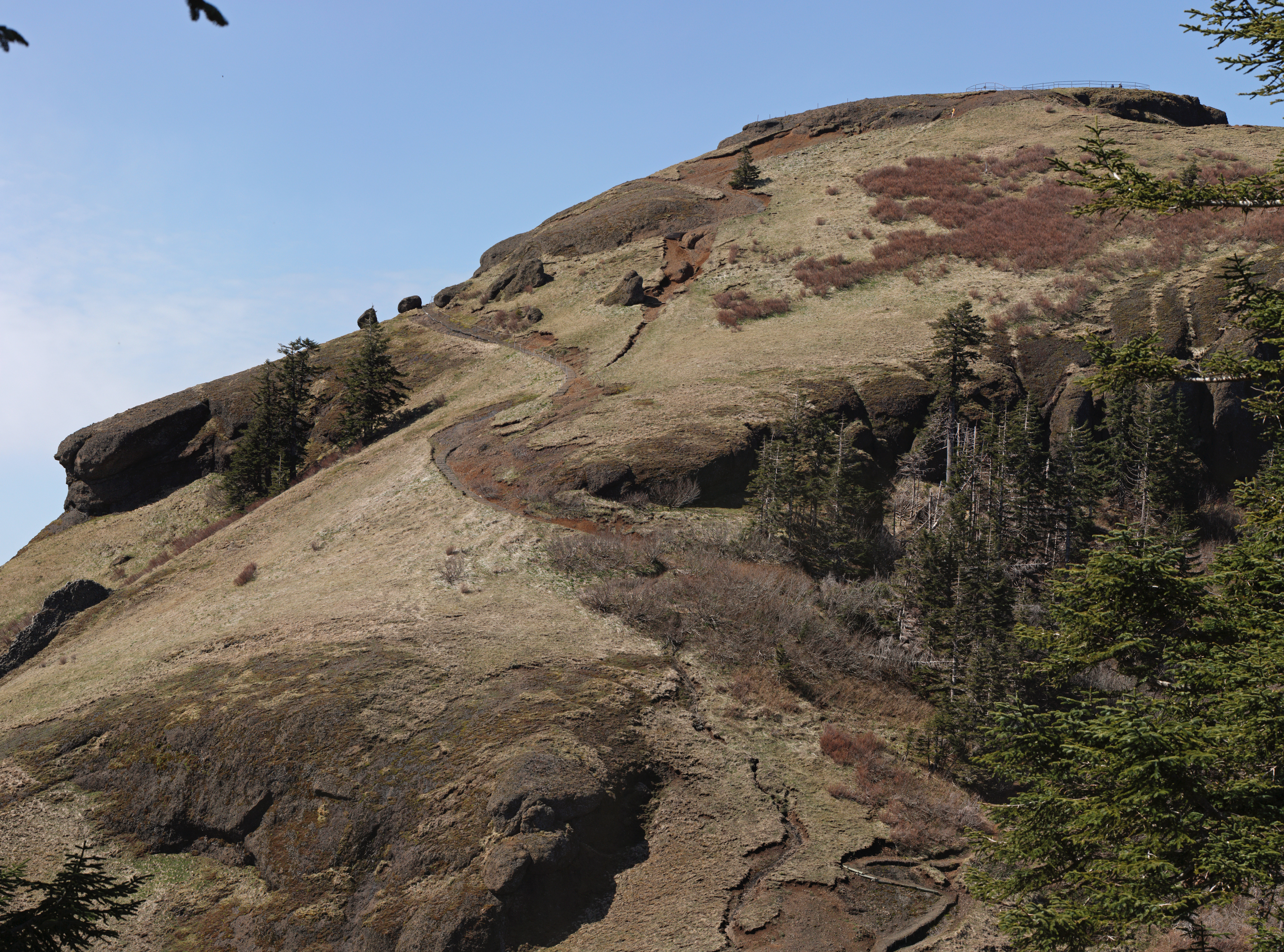
Saddle Mountain Summit

== See also ==
- South Saddle Mountain
