= Miami River (Oregon) =

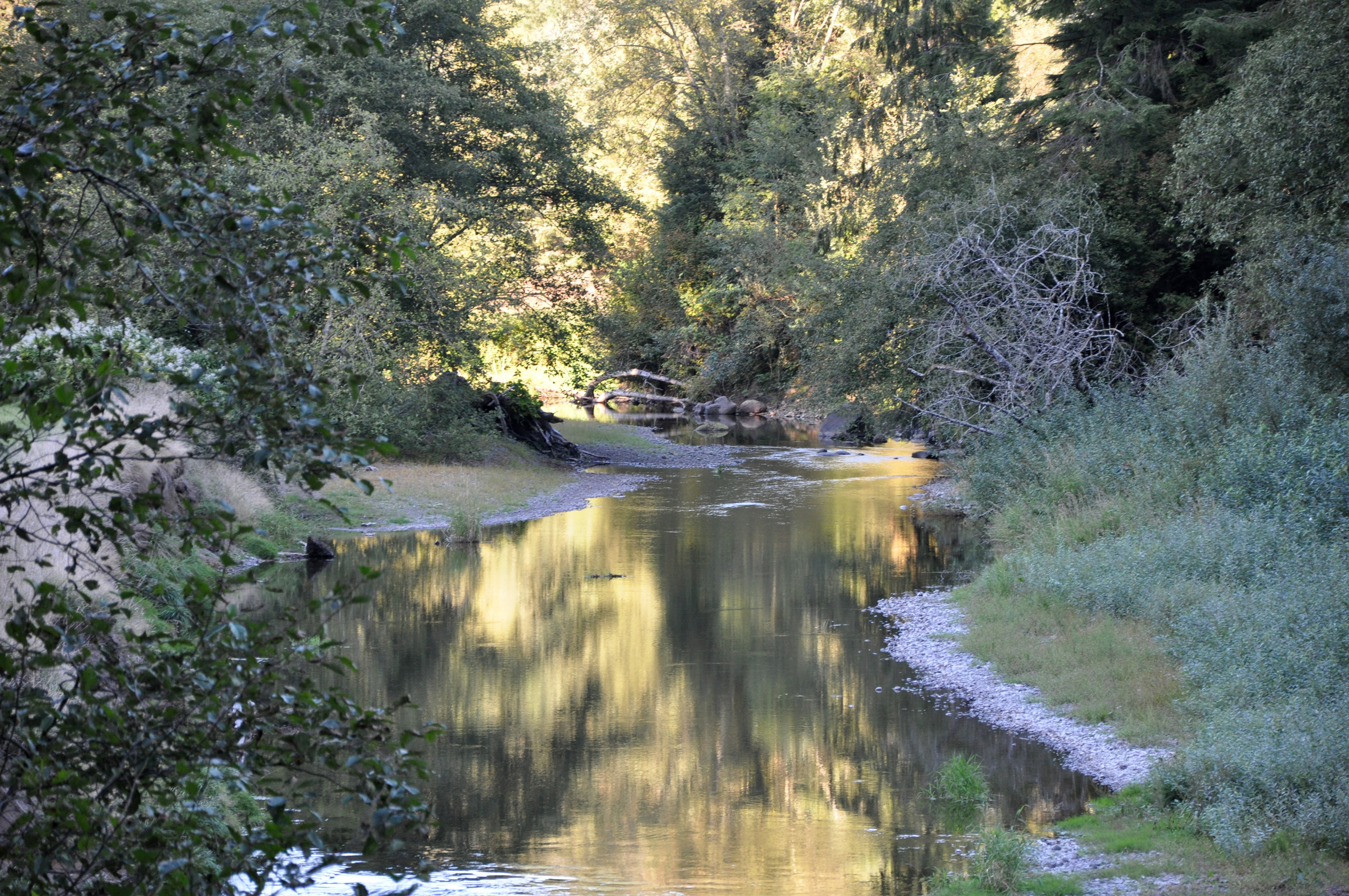
- Lower Miami River

- Location of the mouth of the Miami River in Oregon

Location
- Country: United States
- State: Oregon
- County: Tillamook County

Physical characteristics
- Source: Northern Oregon Coast Range
  - location: Northeast of Tillamook
  - coordinates: 45°38′51″N 123°43′44″W
  - elevation: 1,782 ft (543 m)
- Mouth: Tillamook Bay
  - location: Oregon
  - coordinates: 45°33′35″N 123°53′37″W
  - elevation: 7 ft (2.1 m)
- Length: 13 mi (21 km)
- Basin size: 36.7 sq mi (95 km^{2})

The Miami River is a stream, approximately 13 miles (21 km) long, on the coast of northwest Oregon in the United States. It drains a mountainous timbered region of the Northern Oregon Coast Range west of Portland, into Pacific Ocean.

The river rises in northern Tillamook County in the Tillamook State Forest and flows generally southwest, entering the north end of Tillamook Bay near Garibaldi. Descending swiftly from 1,782 feet (543 m) to near sea level, the Miami does not pass through any communities. It is one of five rivers—the Tillamook, the Trask, the Wilson, the Kilchis, and the Miami—that flow into the bay.

The river's name is based on the Chinook Jargon phrase Mi-me Chuck, meaning a tributary or downriver stream. Over time the expressive became corrupted into Miami, the familiar place name used in Ohio, Florida, and elsewhere.

== Course ==
Flowing generally southwest through the forest, the Miami River receives Prouty Creek from the right about 5.5 miles (8.9 km) from the mouth. Further downstream, Peterson Creek and Minich Creek enter from the right before the river receives Moss Creek from the left slightly more than 1 mile (1.6 km) from the mouth. Illingsworth Creek enters from the left and Struby Creek and Hobson Creek from the right just before the river passes under U.S. Route 101. Electric Creek enters from the left as the river enters Miami Cove on Tillamook Bay. At this point, Garibaldi is to the river's right. Miami Road runs along the lower stretches of the river.

== See also ==
- List of rivers of Oregon
