= Wilson River (Oregon) =

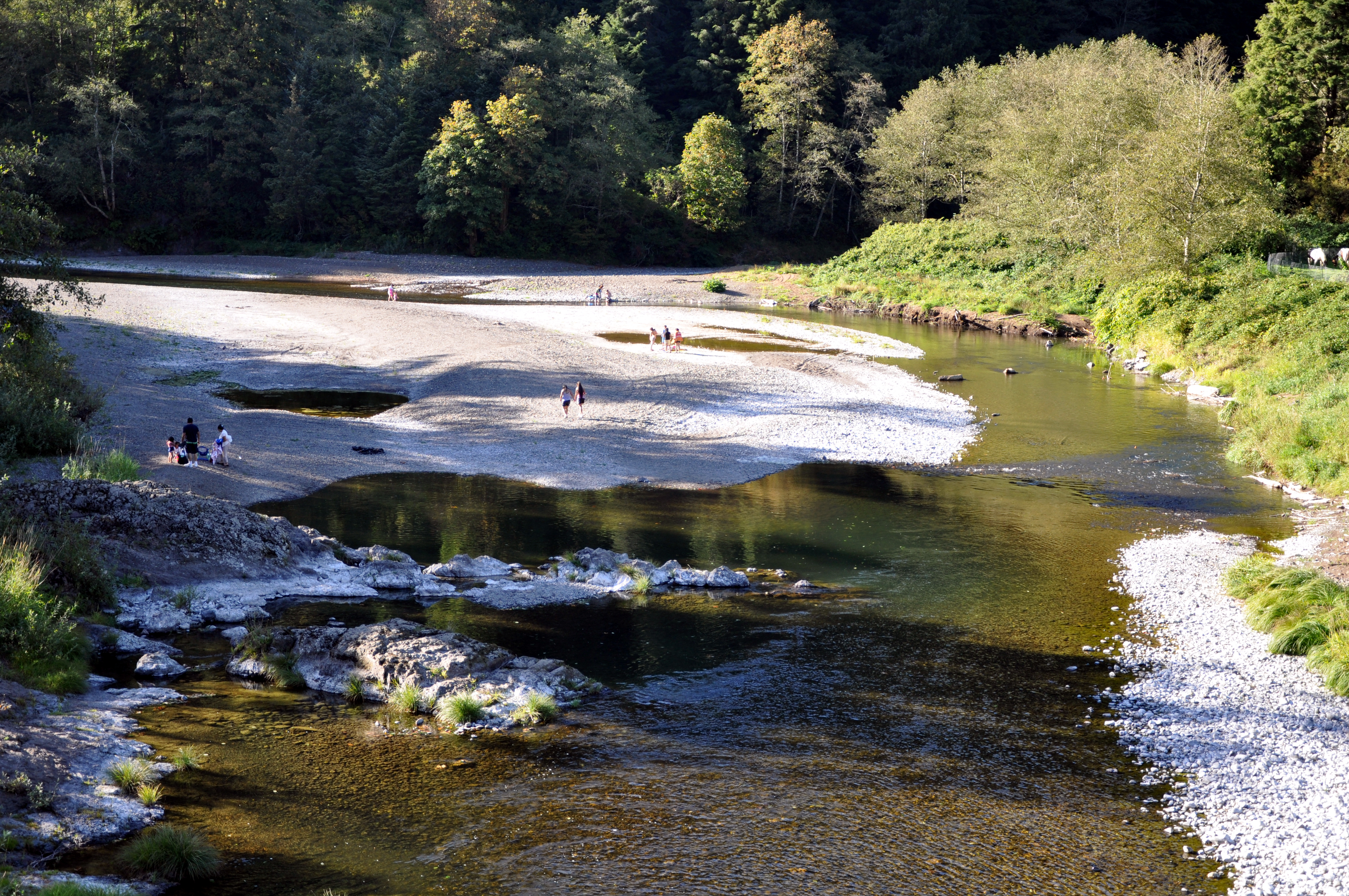
- Wilson River from Oregon Route 6 bridge near Tillamook

- Location of the mouth of the Wilson River in Oregon

Location
- Country: United States
- State: Oregon
- County: Tillamook County

Physical characteristics
- Source: Northern Oregon Coast Range
  - location: East of Tillamook
  - coordinates: 45°36′22″N 123°27′45″W
  - elevation: 871 ft (265 m)
- Mouth: Tillamook Bay
  - location: Oregon
  - coordinates: 45°28′44″N 123°53′24″W
  - elevation: 0 ft (0 m)
- Length: 33 mi (53 km)
- Basin size: 194 sq mi (500 km^{2})
- Discharge
  - average: 1,177 cu ft/s (33.3 m^{3}/s)
  - minimum: 32 cu ft/s (0.91 m^{3}/s)
  - maximum: 38,600 cu ft/s (1,090 m^{3}/s)

The Wilson River, about 33 miles (53 km) long, flows from the Northern Oregon Coast Range to Tillamook Bay in the U.S. state of Oregon. Formed by the confluence of its Devil's Lake Fork and its South Fork, it runs generally west through the Tillamook State Forest to its mouth near the city of Tillamook. It is one of five rivers—the Tillamook, the Trask, the Wilson, the Kilchis, and the Miami—that flow into the bay.

== Course ==
The river rises in the Tillamook State Forest in the mountains of northeastern Tillamook County. The river's North Fork rises in northern Tillamook County and flows south. Its South Fork rises in eastern Tillamook County and western Washington County and flows west to merge with Devils Lake Fork. Further downstream, the Wilson River receives the North Fork near Lees Camp. It then flows southwest to Tillamook, entering the southeast end of Tillamook Bay about 3 miles (5 km) northwest of the city. The mouth of the river is about 1 mile (1.6 km) north of the mouth of the Trask River and slightly south of the mouth of the Kilchis River. Oregon Route 6, also known as the Wilson River Highway, runs parallel to the river and links the Tualatin Valley and the Portland metropolitan area with the Oregon Coast.

=== Discharge ===
The United States Geological Survey (USGS) monitors the flow of the Wilson River at a stream gauge 9.3 miles (15.0 km) from the mouth of the river. The average flow at this gauge is 1,177 cubic feet per second (33.3 m^{3}/s). This is from a drainage area of 161 square miles (417 km^{2}), about 83 percent of the total Wilson River watershed. The maximum flow recorded there was 38,600 cubic feet per second (1,090 m^{3}/s) on November 6, 2006, and the minimum flow was 32 cubic feet per second (0.91 m^{3}/s) on September 5, 1973, although it might have been less for a short while after a landslide on January 31, 1965.

=== Floods ===
The Wilson River was part of the Willamette Valley flood of 1996 when it rose to 19.51 inches on February 8, damaging roads and farms and houses in Tillamook. Since then it has risen to its highest recorded reading of 22.84 inches on November 7, 2006.

== Fishing ==
According to Fishing Oregon: An Angler's Guide to Oregon, the Wilson River is "one of the state's best steelhead and Chinook salmon fisheries". Spring Chinook average about 20 pounds (9.1 kg), fall Chinook from 25 to 28 pounds (11 to 13 kg), and Steelhead from 10 to 12 pounds (4.5 to 5.4 kg). County-owned boat launches on the lower reaches and public access via Route 6 through the Tillamook State Forest make the river easily accessible to anglers. State regulations govern the seasons and methods of fishing.

== See also ==
- List of rivers of Oregon
