= Wallooskee River =

- Location of the mouth of the Wallooskee River in Oregon
- Etymology: Wallooska, who in 1851 was the sole surviving member of a small band of Chinookan Indians who lived nearby

Location
- Country: United States
- State: Oregon
- County: Clatsop County

Physical characteristics
- Source: Northern Oregon Coast Range
  - location: Clatsop County, Oregon
  - coordinates: 46°06′29″N 123°40′29″W
  - elevation: 886 ft (270 m)
- Mouth: Youngs River
  - location: near Astoria, Clatsop County, Oregon
  - coordinates: 46°08′49″N 123°48′40″W
  - elevation: 3 ft (0.91 m)
- Length: 10 mi (16 km)

The Wallooskee River (also known as the Walluski River) is a tributary of the Youngs River, about 10 miles (16 km) long, in northwest Oregon in the United States. It drains a small area of the foothills of the Coast Range near the mouth of the Columbia River. The Youngs River is a tributary of the Columbia River.

It rises southwest of Astoria in a northern Clatsop County at 46.108165°N 123.674857°W. It flows generally west in a winding course. About a mile (1.6 km) before its mouth, it receives the Little Wallooskee River from the right at 46.1423303°N 123.780417°W which flows about 2 miles (3.2 km) from its source at 46.1395532°N 123.735971°W. The Wallooskee enters Youngs River from the east at the south end of Youngs Bay, approximately 2 miles (3.2 km) south of Astoria.

== Walluski ==
The name of the river was formerly spelled "Walluski" but the Board on Geographic Names changed it to "Wallooskee" in 1975. Although there is not a formal settlement by the name of Walluski, Oregon, the Olney-Walluski area is considered a community by local residents and the Walluski area was a census precinct as recently as 1950. As of 1892, there was a Walluski School. The school was located near Oregon State University's John Jacob Astor Agricultural Experiment Station, that was later used as the Clatsop Community College farm and today is the site of the Clatsop County Fairgrounds.

There is also a Walluski soil series named for the area.

== See also ==
- Klaskanine River
- List of rivers of Oregon
