= Tillamook River =

River in Oregon, United States

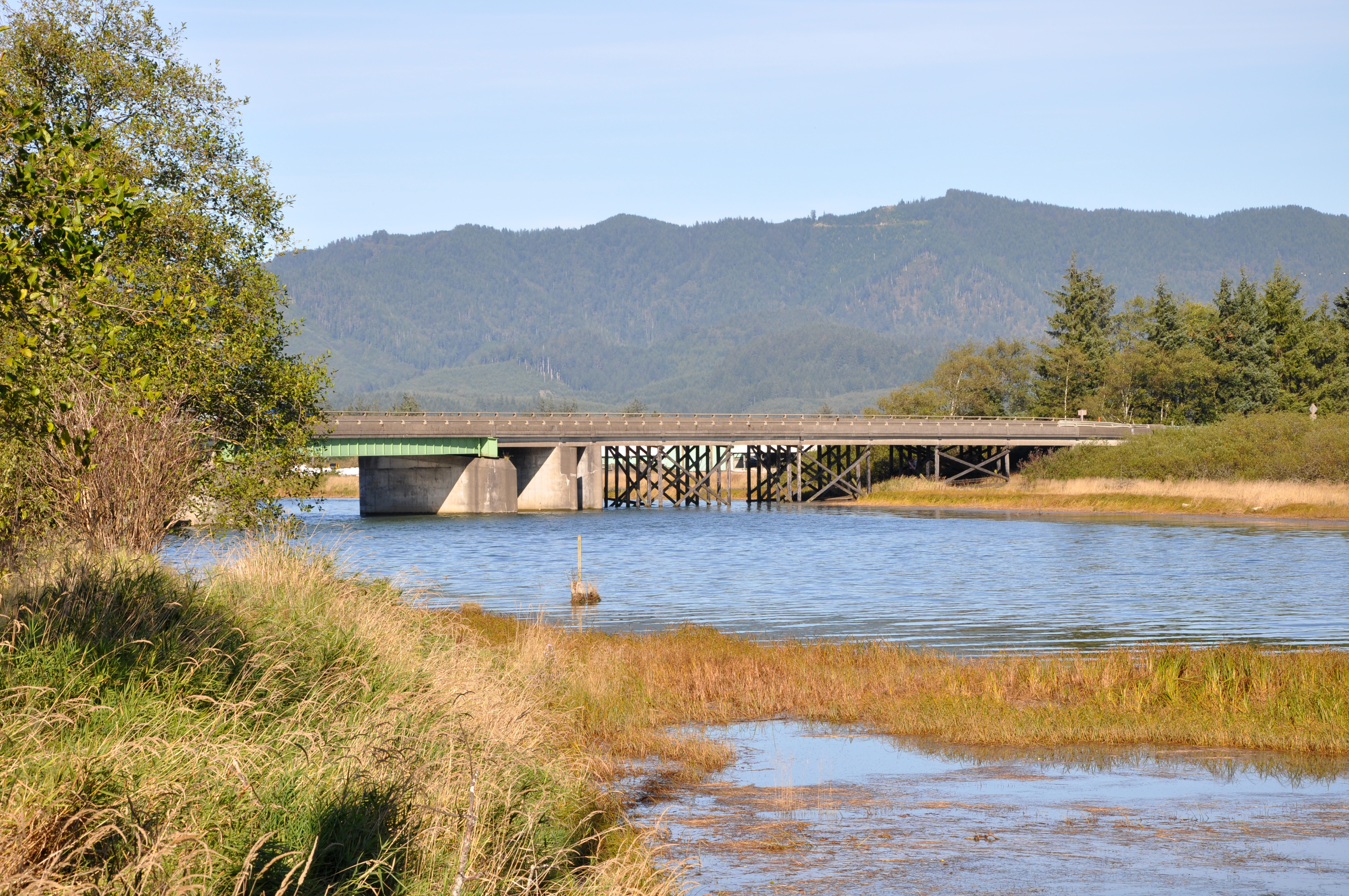
- Lower Tillamook River at Oregon Route 131 bridge

- Location of the mouth of the Tillamook River in Oregon

Location
- Country: United States
- State: Oregon
- County: Tillamook County

Physical characteristics
- Source: Northern Oregon Coast Range
  - location: low coastal hills southwest of Tillamook
  - coordinates: 45°21′50″N 123°54′58″W
  - elevation: 744 ft (227 m)
- Mouth: Tillamook Bay
  - location: Oregon
  - coordinates: 45°29′15″N 123°54′06″W
  - elevation: 0 ft (0 m)
- Length: 17 mi (27 km)
- Basin size: 61 sq mi (160 km^{2})

The Tillamook River is a stream, about 17 miles (27 km) long, near the coast of northwest Oregon in the United States. It drains an oceanside valley in the foothills of the Northern Oregon Coast Range west of Portland and empties into the Pacific Ocean via Tillamook Bay. It is one of five rivers—the Tillamook, the Trask, the Wilson, the Kilchis, and the Miami—that flow into the bay.

Rising in southern Tillamook County about 4 miles (6.4 km) east of Cape Lookout, it flows initially east, then generally north, through a long broadening farming valley, passing west of Tillamook and entering the south end of Tillamook Bay. For its lower 1 mile (1.6 km), it shares a channel with the Trask River.

Although much of the upper watershed of about 61 square miles (160 km^{2}) is forested, much of the lower valley consists of drained pasture land.

== Tributaries ==
Named tributaries from source to mouth are Mills, Munson, Joe, Simmons, Fawcett, Killam, and Bewley creeks. Then come Sutton, Beaver, Anderson, Fagan, Esther, Tomlinson, Memaloose, and Dick creeks.

== See also ==
- List of rivers of Oregon
