= Northern Oregon Coast Range =

Mountain in United States of America

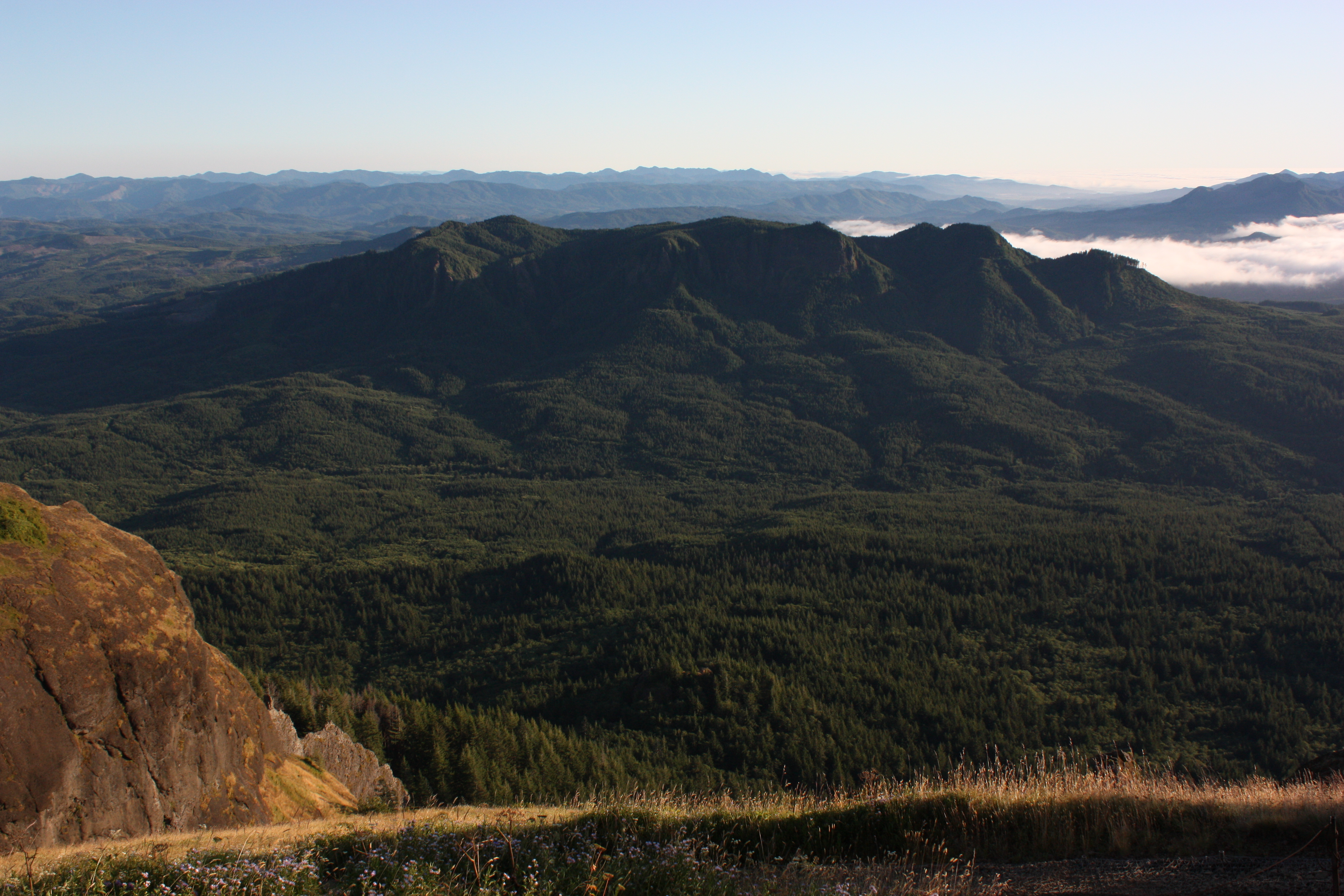
- The Northern Coast Range, seen from Saddle Mountain in Clatsop County

Highest point
- Peak: Rogers Peak
- Elevation: 3,706 ft (1,130 m)
- Coordinates: 45°39′53″N 123°32′53″W

Dimensions
- Length: 100 mi (160 km) north–south

Geography
- Country: United States
- State: Oregon
- Subdivision: Tualatin Mountains
- Parent range: Oregon Coast Range, Pacific Coast Ranges
- Borders on: Central Oregon Coast Range

Geology
- Orogenies: Geologic fault, basalt flows
- Rock ages: Paleocene and Eocene
- Rock types: volcanic and forearc basin

The Northern Oregon Coast Range is the northern section of the Oregon Coast Range, in the Pacific Coast Ranges physiographic region, located in the northwest portion of the state of Oregon, United States. This section of the mountain range, part of the Pacific Coast Ranges, contains peaks as high as 3,710 feet (1,131 m) for Rogers Peak. Forests in these mountains are considered to be some of the most productive timber land in the world. The Central Oregon Coast Range is directly south of this section with the Southern Oregon Coast Range beyond the central range.

== Geology ==
The origins of these mountains began approximately 40 million years ago during the Eocene age. During this time-period, sandstone and siltstone formed in the area. Additionally, igneous rocks and basalt flows combined with basaltic sandstone to create many of the mountainous formations. Other sedimentary rock in the area formed more recently, around 20 million years ago. It is hypothesized that portions of the northern section of the range were islands during parts of the Eocene era. Other portions of the mountains consist of marine sedimentary rock. The entire coast range sits on a convergent tectonic margin interacting with the Juan de Fuca Plate that is subducting beneath North America tectonic plate. Also, weathering and erosion of the region is a major factor in shaping the landscape. Heavy rainfall and landslides have worked to alter the mountains.

The range is part of a broad, plunging structural arch of sedimentary and Tertiary volcanic strata that is being uplifted. Eocene and Miocene sections form the flanks of the uplifted sections. Some of the oldest rocks are submarine tholeiitic basalts from the Eocene era. The basalt came from the basalt flows that covered much of Oregon and originated from volcanoes in the central portion of the state. Other rocks include sandstone, mudstone, and siltstone. It was during the middle Miocene period that the range was uplifted in the broad, northeast-plunging arch.

== Flora and fauna ==
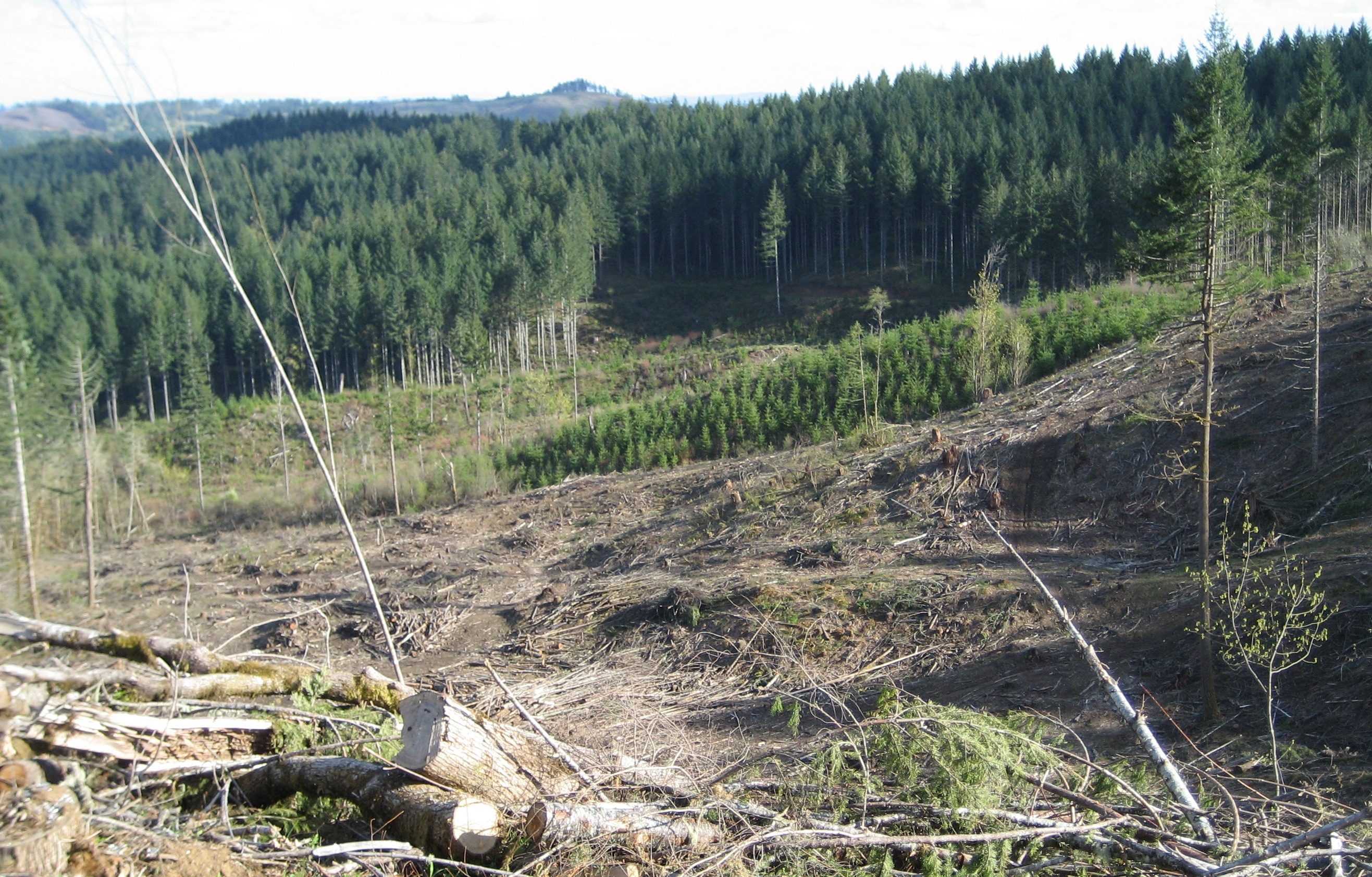
Logging in the mountains

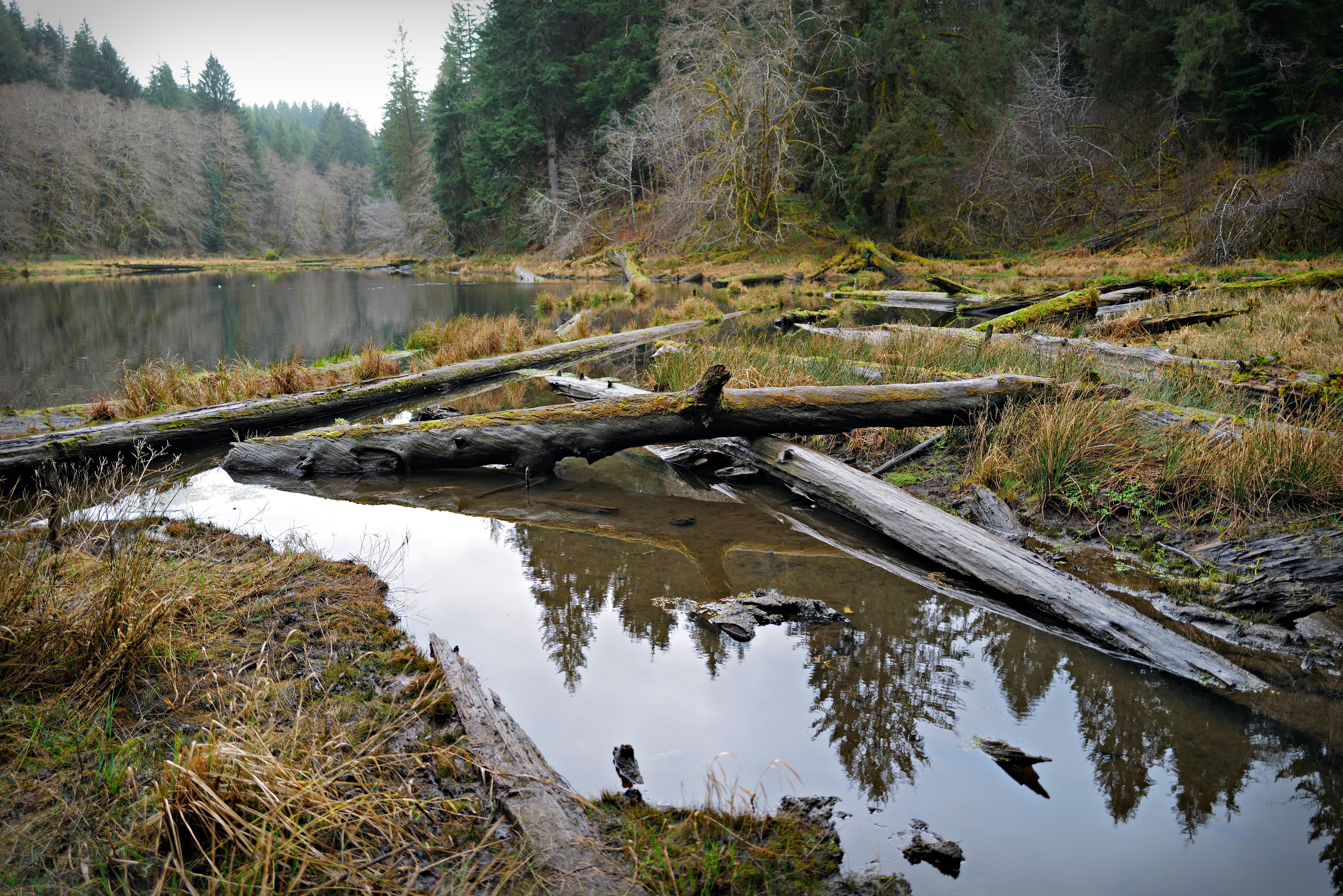
Fallen logs over the outflow from Soapstone Lake.

Portions of the range are in the Siuslaw National Forest and Tillamook State Forest, and large sections of the range were burned in forest fires during the 1930s and 1940s as part of the Tillamook Burn. In the forested areas trees include Sitka spruce, western redcedar, Douglas fir, and western hemlock. Other plants that grow in the region are huckleberry, salmonberry, thimbleberry, salal, vine maple, sword and bracken ferns and Oregon grape to name a few.

Arthropods and molluscs found include collembolans, spiders, beetles, slugs, millipedes, weevils, and various centipedes. Animals that inhabit the Northern Coast range are the rough-skinned newt, chipmunks, bears, rabbits, white-footed deer mice, Columbian black tail deer and others. Birds include chickadees, red-breasted nuthatches, kinglets, Western pileated woodpeckers, Oregon Canada jays, California creepers, and Sitka red crossbills among others.

== Location and climate ==
The range begins at the Columbia River, with some mountainous features on the north side of the river, and continues south roughly 100 miles (160 km) to the Salmon River where Oregon Route 18 traverses the range from the Willamette Valley to the Oregon Coast. The width of the range varies but is roughly 35 miles (56 km).

The climate of the range is moderate because of marine influences, and annual precipitation is heavy, varying from 60 to 180 inches (1,500 to 4,600 mm).

== Peaks ==
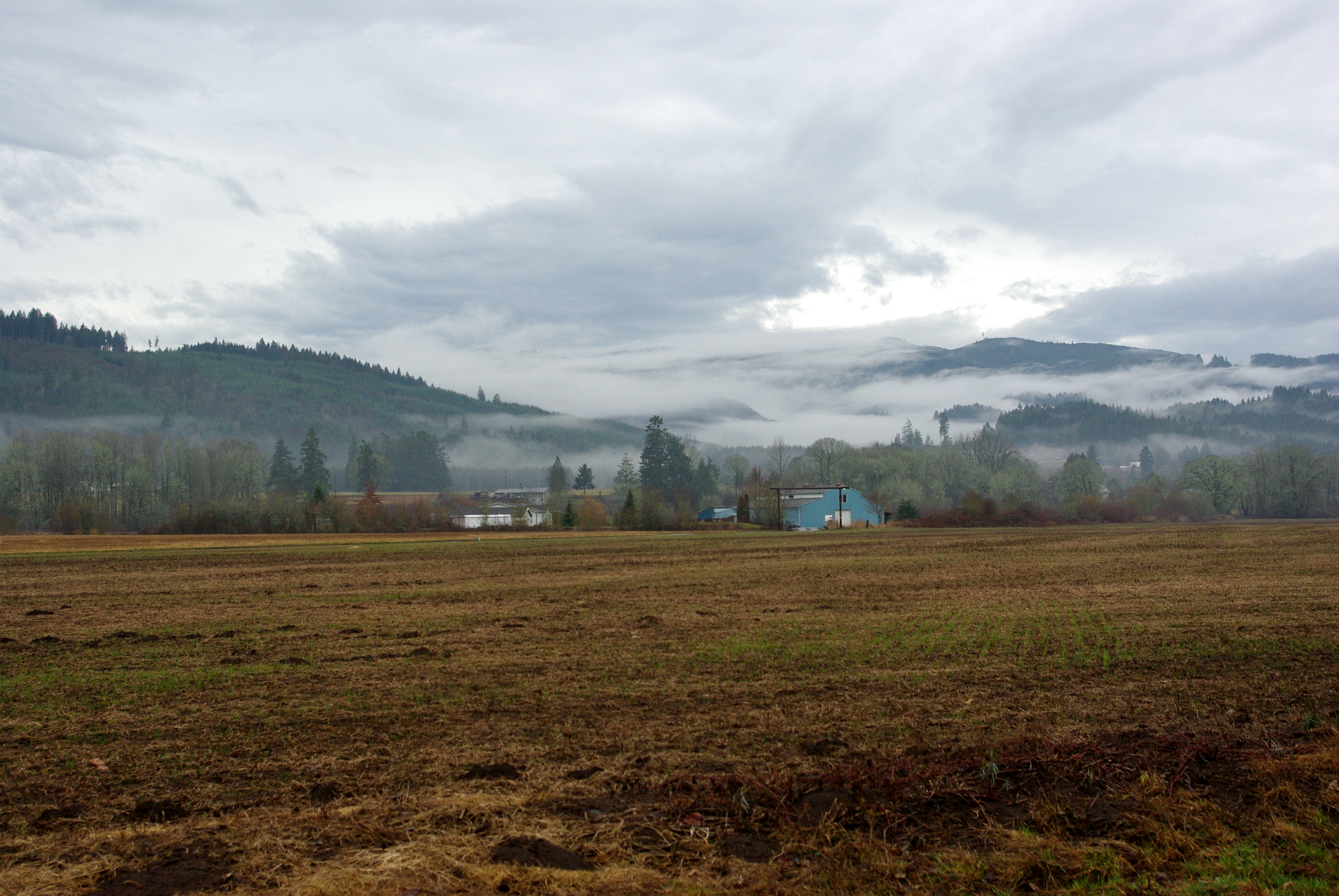
Fog covering the mountains near Balm Grove

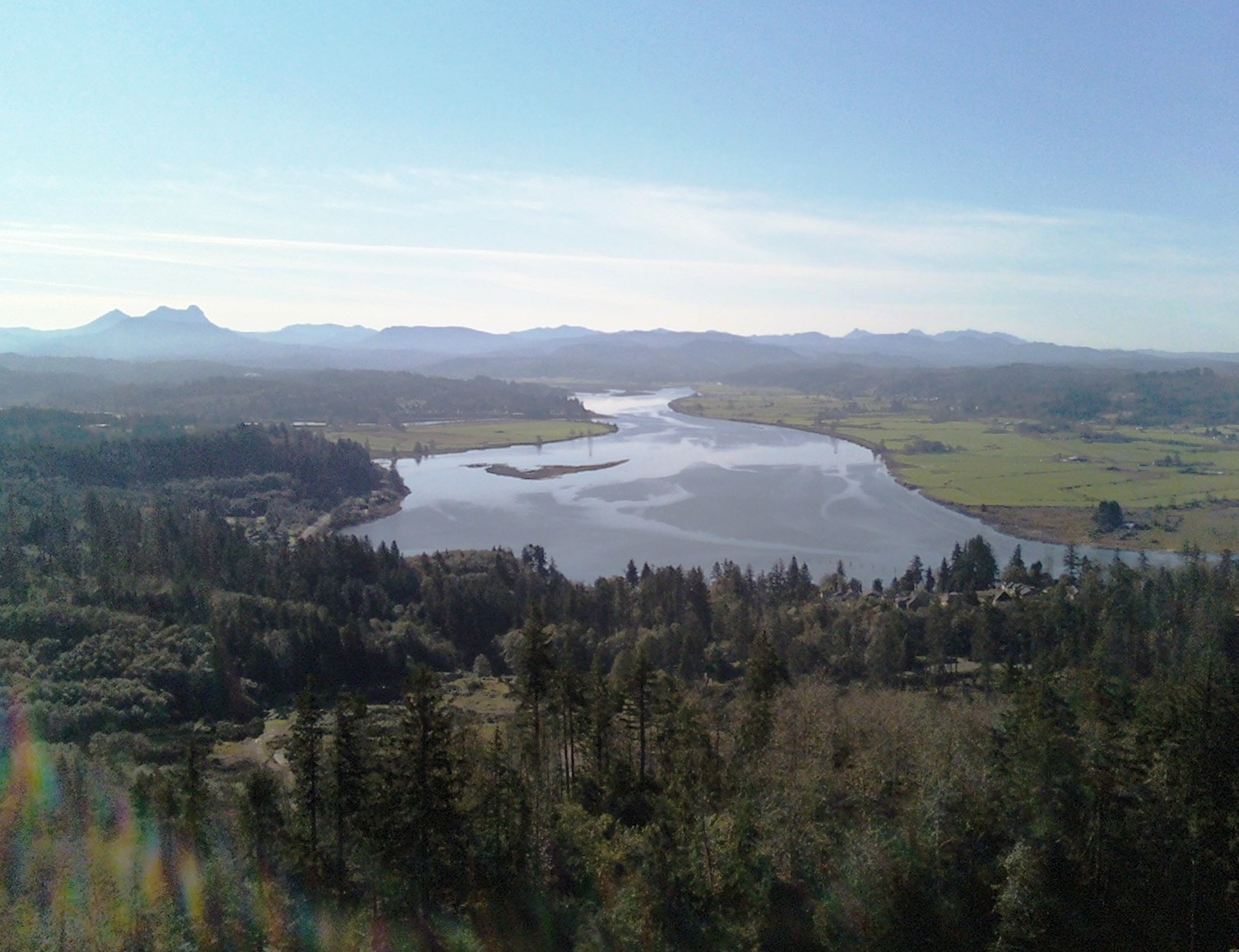
Youngs River, Saddle Mountain and the Northern Oregon Coast Range from the Astoria Column

All mountains over 3,000 feet (910 m) in elevation in the Northern Coast Range.

Mountain Name	Elevation		County
	feet	metres	
Rogers Peak	3,706	1,130	Tillamook
South Saddle Mountain	3,465	1,056	Washington
Larch Mountain	3,452	1,052	Washington
Trask Mountain	3,426	1,044	Yamhill
Saddle Mountain	3,288	1,002	Clatsop
Triangulation Point	3,235	986	Tillamook
Kings Mountain	3,226	983	Tillamook
Mount Hebo	3,154	961	Yamhill
Edwards Butte	3,136	956	Tillamook
Buck Mountain	3,097	944	Tillamook
Sheridan Peak	3,091	942	Yamhill
Woods Point	3,084	940	Tillamook
Gobblers Knob	3,058	932	Tillamook
Onion Peak	3,057	932	Clatsop

=== Other peaks ===
- Round Top (Oregon) 2,982 feet (909 m)
- Neahkahnie Mountain 1,634 feet (498 m)

== Rivers ==
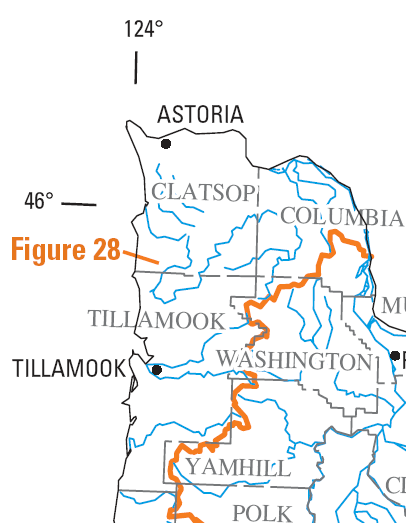
Map of the region with major rivers in blue. Orange line shows divide between watersheds flowing to the east and those flowing north or west.

The following rivers have their headwaters in the Northern Oregon Coast Range:

- Drains to Columbia River:
  - Clatskanie River
  - John Day River
  - Klaskanine River
  - Lewis and Clark River
  - Skipanon River
  - Wallooskee River
  - Youngs River
- Drains to Willamette River:
  - Tualatin River
  - Yamhill River
- Drains to Pacific Ocean:
  - Kilchis River
  - Miami River
  - Necanicum River
  - Nehalem River
  - Nestucca River
  - Salmonberry River
  - Salmon River
  - Tillamook River
  - Trask River
  - Wilson River
