= Tillamook State Forest =

State forest in Oregon, United States

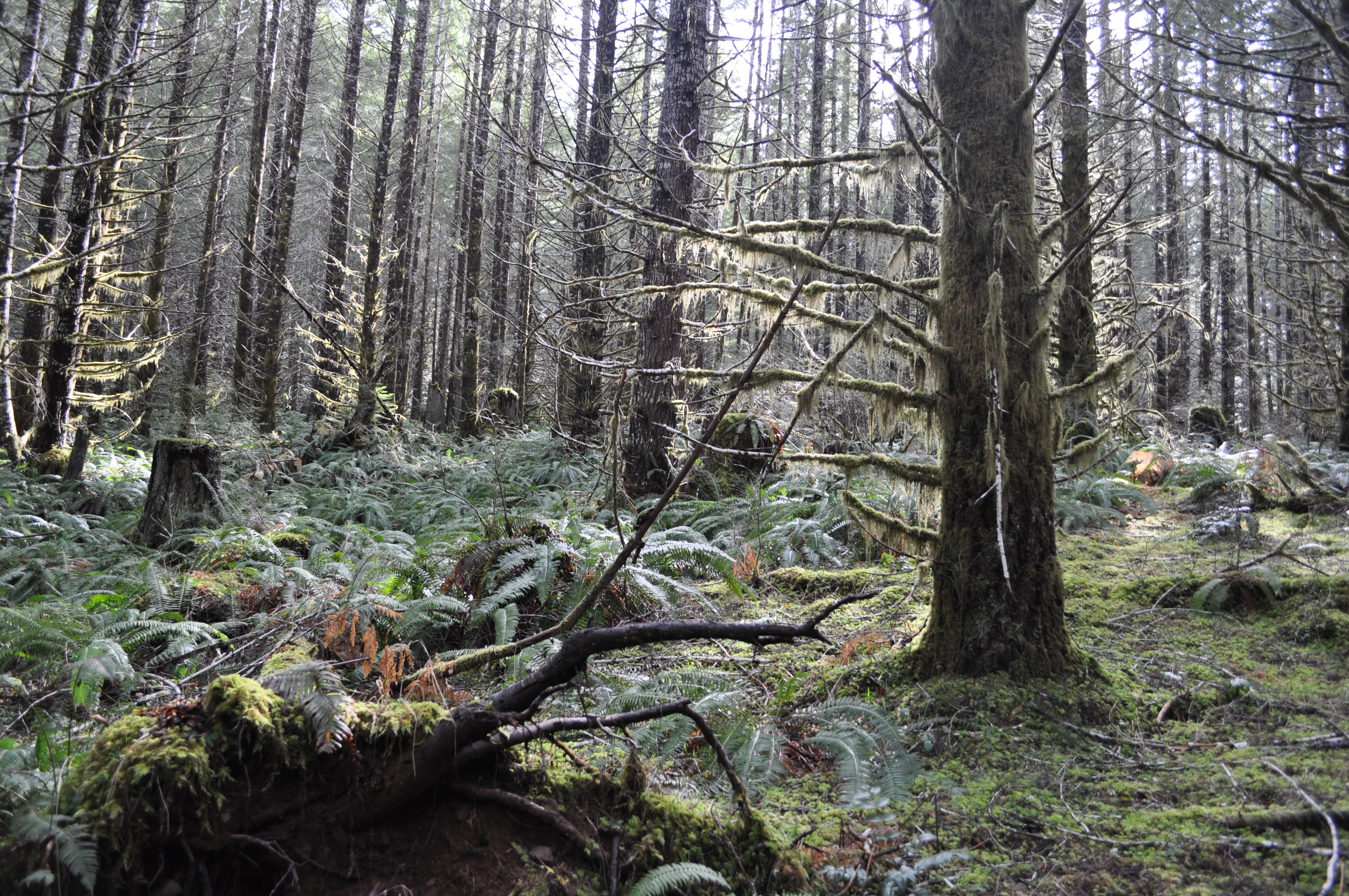
- Tillamook State Forest, February 2010
- Interactive map of Tillamook State Forest
- Type: Public, state
- Location: Oregon, United States
- Coordinates: 45.539278°N 123.289001°W
- Area: 364,000 acres (1,470 km^{2})
- Created: 1973
- Operator: Oregon Department of Forestry

The Tillamook State Forest is a 364,000-acre (1,470 km^{2}) publicly owned forest in the U.S. state of Oregon. Managed by the Oregon Department of Forestry, it is located 40 miles (64 km) west of Portland in the Northern Oregon Coast Range, and spans Washington, Tillamook, Yamhill, and Clatsop counties. The forest receives large amounts of precipitation and is dominated by Douglas-fir trees. Activities include commercial logging, recreation, and other commercial resource extraction activities such as mushroom hunting. It is by far the largest of Oregon's state forests, comprising 49.7% of state forest land.

== History ==
The area was extensively burned in a series of forest fires between 1933 and 1951. Collectively known as the Tillamook Burn, the forest was replanted between 1949 and 1972 with a billion Douglas-fir seeds dropped from helicopters and more than 72 million seedlings planted by hand, about a million of them by young volunteers. In 1973 Oregon governor Tom McCall officially designated "The Burn" a State Forest.

== Operations ==
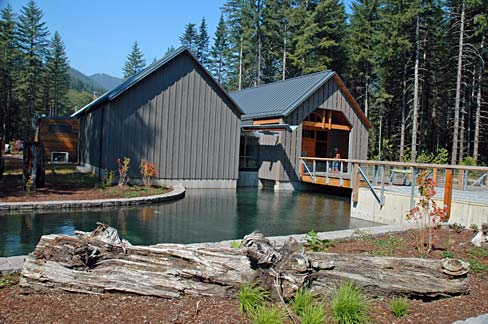
Tillamook Forest Center

The forest's recreation sites include campgrounds, hiking and backpacking trails, fishing, swimming and an interpretative center. Some of the trails are open to horses and pack animals, mountain bikes and motorized vehicles in various combinations. In 2006, the Tillamook Forest Center opened on Oregon Route 6 between Portland and Tillamook. The Forest Center's features include a short film about the Tillamook Burn, and a suspension bridge crossing the Wilson River. With exhibits designed by AldrichPears Associates and architecture by MillerHull Partnership, the Center won the Oregon Tourism Achievement Award in 2007.

Commercial activities include timber harvesting managed by the Department of Forestry that benefits county governments. In addition to logging, other commercial activities include mushroom hunting, and moss and salal harvesting. The forest is managed by the department's Forest Grove and Tillamook districts.

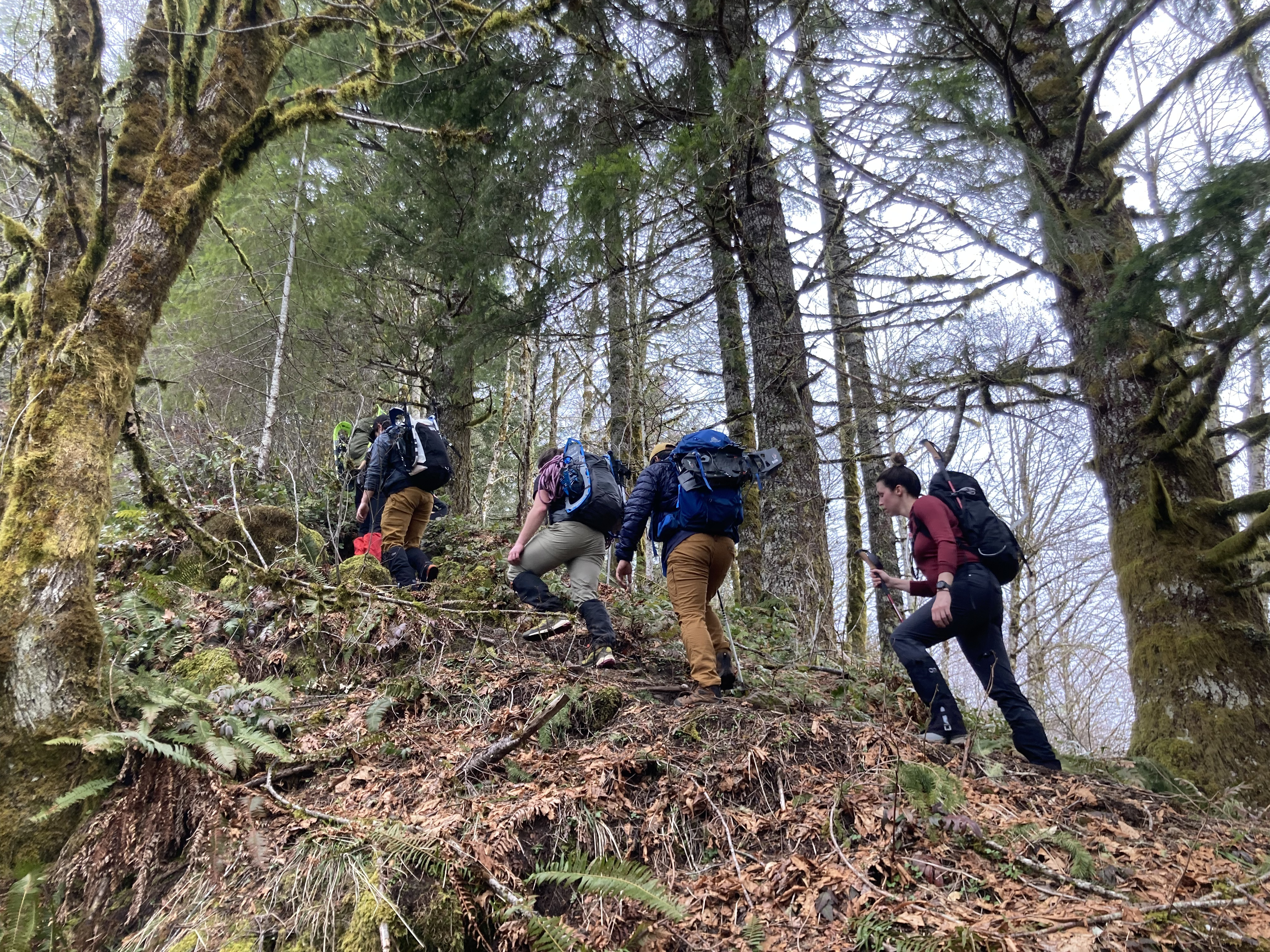
Hikers in Tillamook State Forest

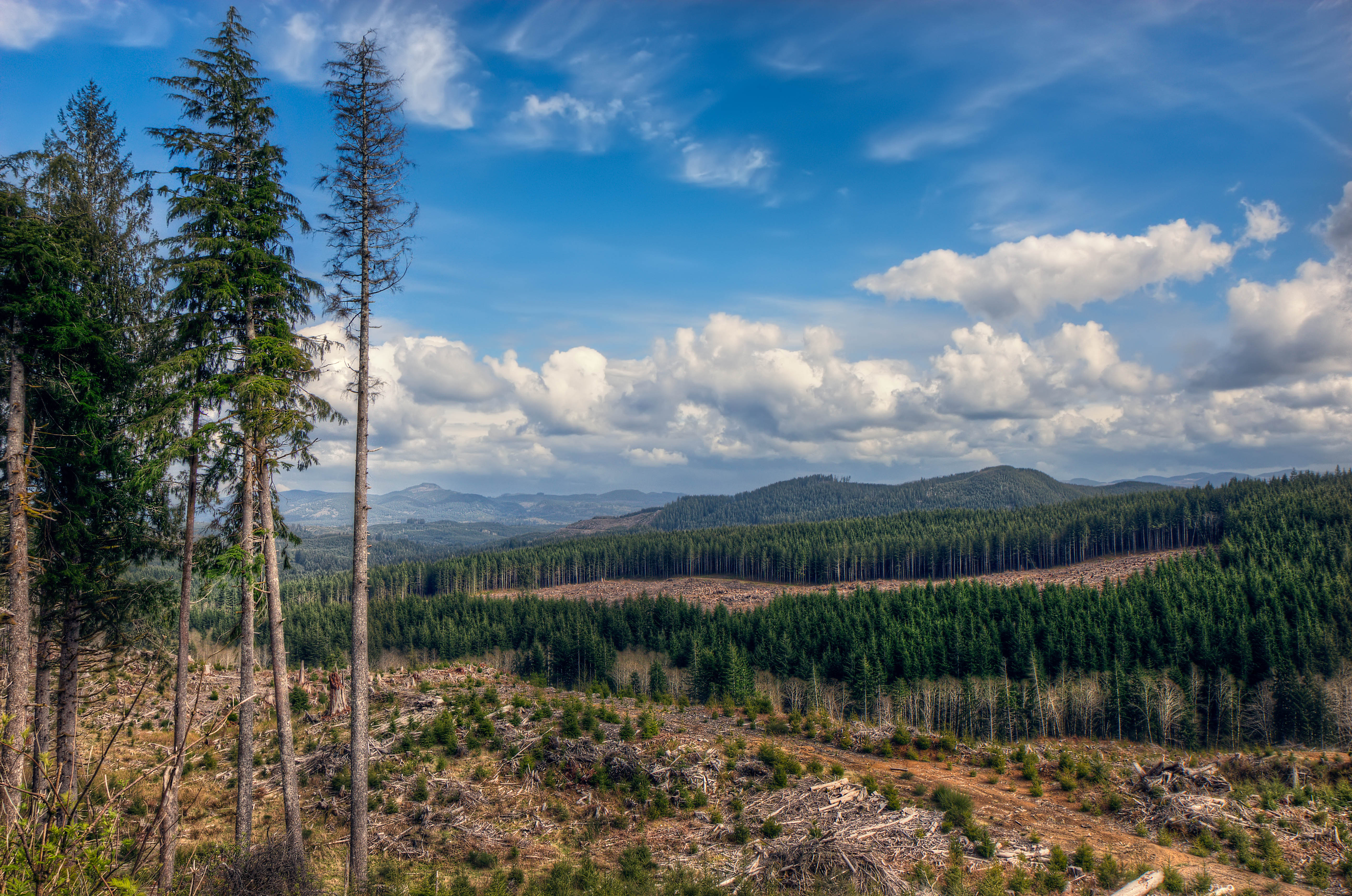
Tillamook state forest - logging area

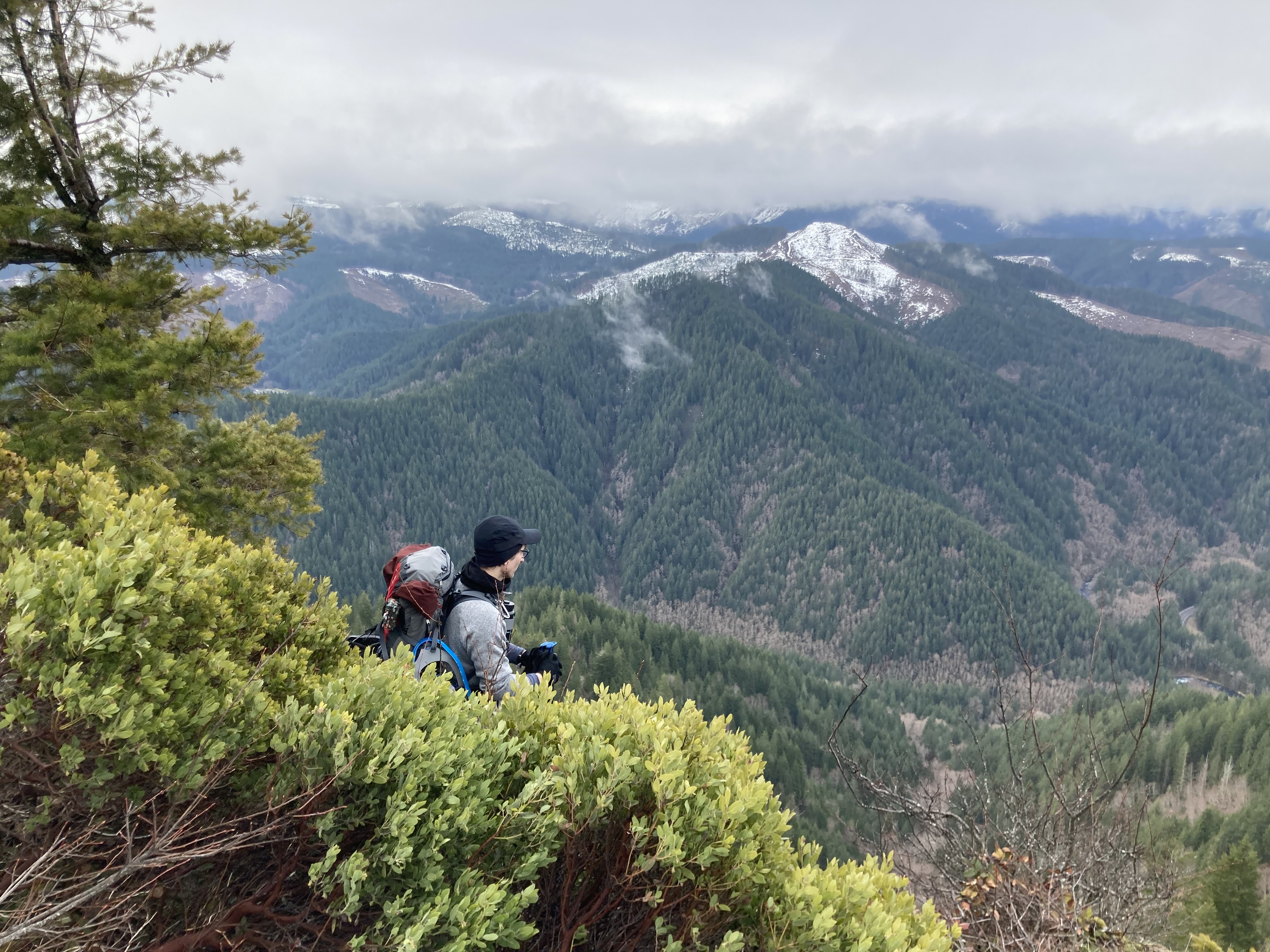
Hiker looking out on Tillamook State Forest

== Tillamook Rainforest ==
The Tillamook Rainforest is a temperate rainforest located in the Coast Range of northwestern Oregon, United States, between Hillsboro and Tillamook in Washington and Tillamook counties. Part of the forest is administered as part of the Tillamook State Forest.

Weather in the Tillamook Rainforest is variable but can total more than 100 inches (2,500 mm) from late fall through early spring. Precipitation may accumulate as snow at higher elevations.

The western part of the forest has coastal varieties of trees, while the east is dominated by Douglas-fir. Much of the forest is young, as early deforestation was rampant and the Tillamook Burn, a large wildfire, passed through the area in 1933.

== See also ==
- List of Oregon state forests
- Ki-a-Kuts Falls
- Rogers Peak
- South Saddle Mountain
