= Meriwether (name) =

Meriwether has been used as both a given name and surname. Notable people with the name include:

== Surname ==
- Chuck Meriwether (1956–2019), American Major League Baseball umpire
- Colyer Meriwether (1858–1920), American historian, educator and writer
- David Meriwether (disambiguation), multiple people, including:
  - David Meriwether (Georgia politician) (1755–1822), Congressional Representative from Georgia
  - David Meriwether (Kentucky politician) (1800–1893), Senator from Kentucky and Governor of New Mexico
- Delano Meriwether (born 1943), American doctor and track and field athlete
- Elizabeth Meriwether (born 1981), American playwright and screenwriter
- Elizabeth Avery Meriwether (1824–1916), American author, publisher and activist in the women's suffrage movement
- James Meriwether (1789–1854), American politician and lawyer from Georgia
- James Archibald Meriwether (1806–1852), American politician and lawyer from Georgia
- John Meriwether (born 1947), American hedge fund executive and a pioneer of fixed income arbitrage
- Lee Meriwether (born 1935), American actress who was Miss America 1955
- Lee Meriwether (author) (1862–1966), American author and government official
- Lide Meriwether (1829–1913), American feminist leader and women's rights activist
- Louise Meriwether (1923–2023), American novelist, essayist, journalist and activist
- Nana Meriwether (born 1985), American beauty pageant winner who was Miss USA 2012
- Nicholas Meriwether (1665–1744), wealthy land owner of Colony of Virginia
- Porter Meriwether (1940–2009), American basketball player

== Given name ==
- Meriwether Clark (disambiguation), multiple people, including:
  - Meriwether Lewis Clark Sr. (1809–1879), U.S. Army officer and Confederate general in the American Civil War
  - Meriwether Lewis Clark Jr. (1846–1899), American businessman and horse racing manager
- Meriwether Lewis (1774–1809), American explorer, soldier, and public administrator
- Meriwether Smith (1730–1790), American planter from Essex County, Virginia
- Meriwether Lewis Walker (1869–1947), Governor of the Panama Canal Zone from 1924 to 1928

== See also ==
- Meriwether (disambiguation)
- Meriweather
