= Camp Lewis (Washington) =

Scout camp in Washington, United States

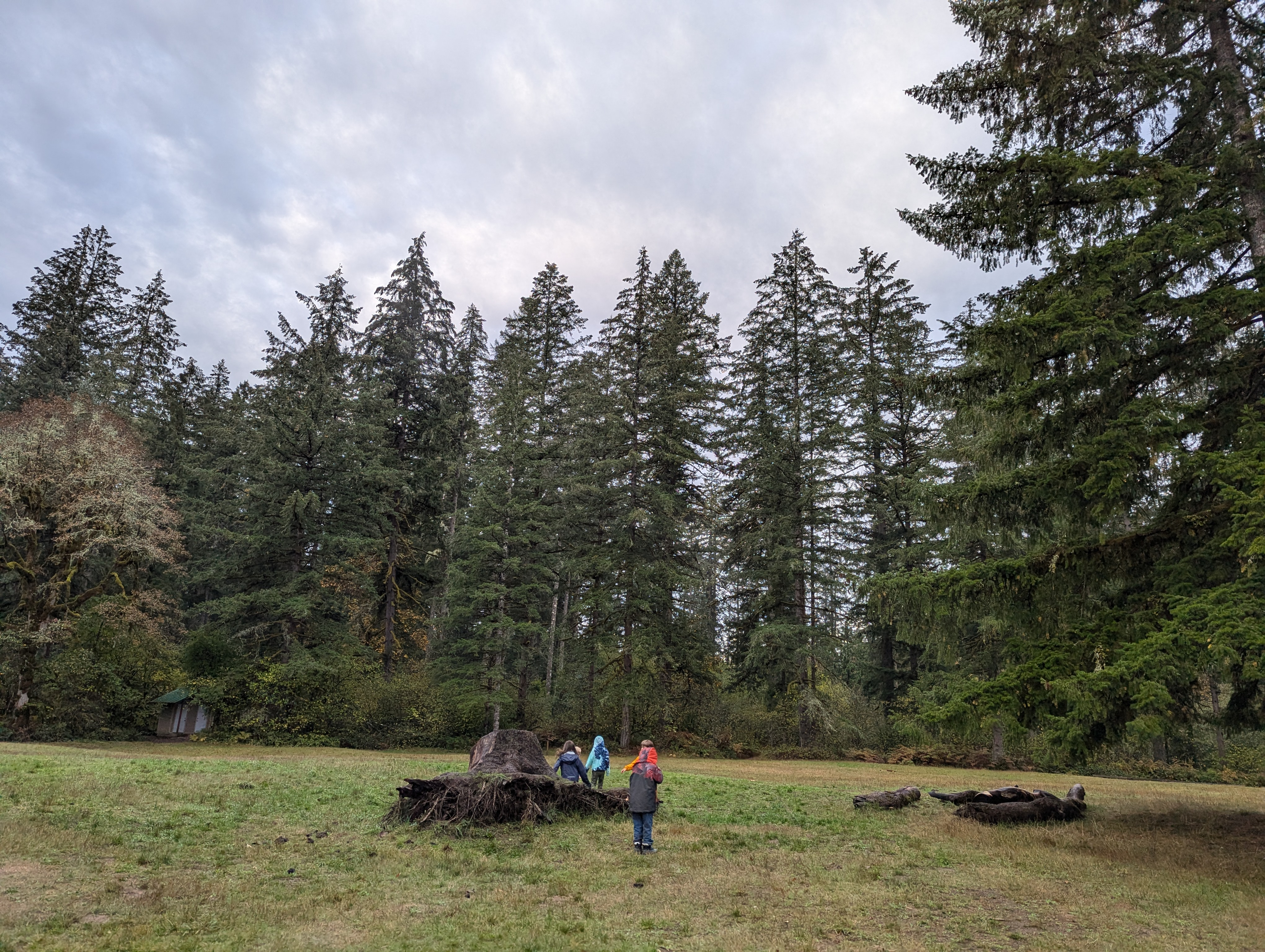
- Scouts play around the stump of a fallen tree in the large meadow at Camp Lewis
- Owner: Cascade Pacific Council
- Location: Battle Ground, Washington
- Country: United States
- Coordinates: 45.823425°N 122.531124°W
- Camp size: 116 acres (47 ha)
- Founded: 1958
- Website cpcscouting.org/project/camp-lewis/

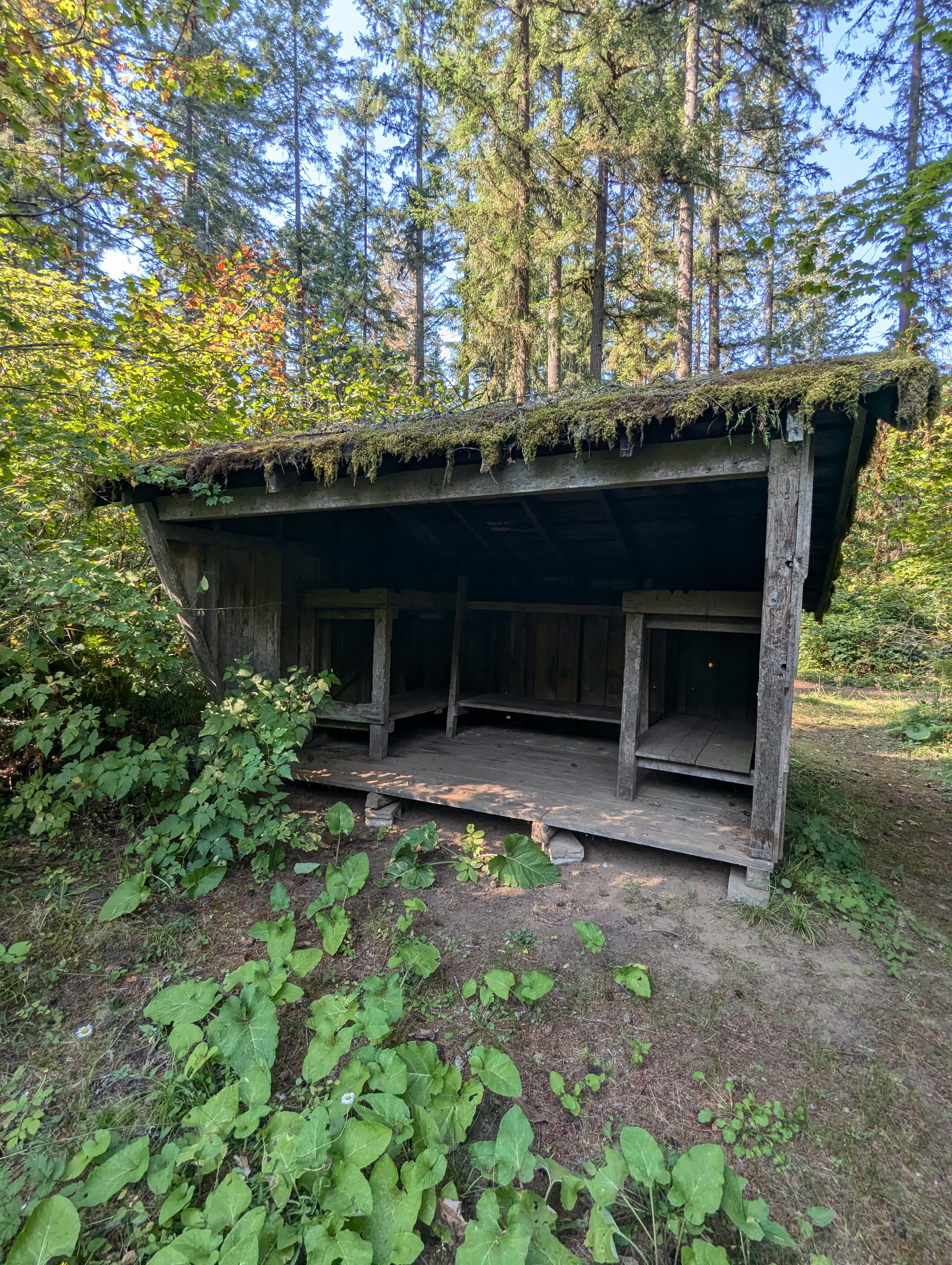
An adirondack lean-to cabin at Camp Lewis

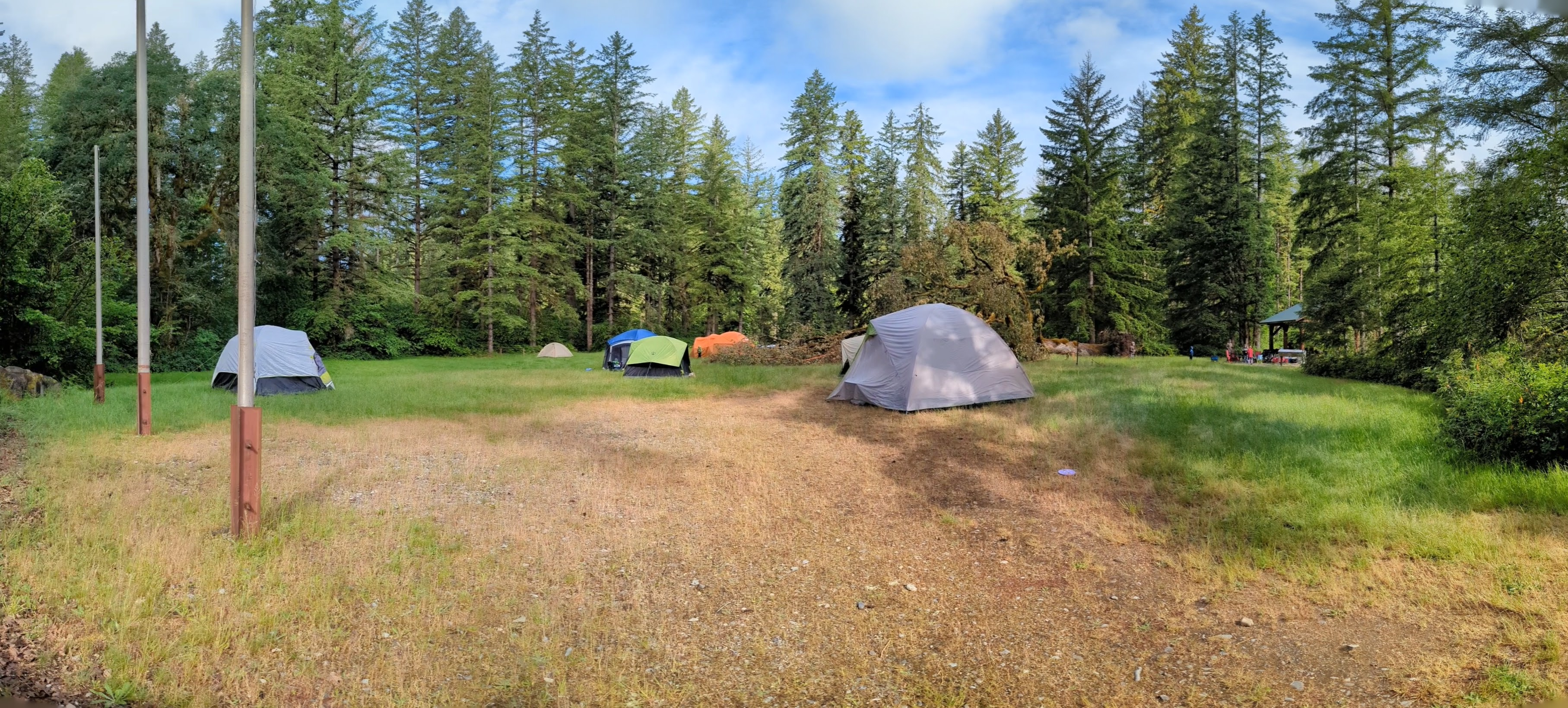
Tents set up near flagpoles in Camp Lewis' large meadow

Camp Lewis is a 116-acre Scouting America camp located near Battle Ground, Washington, United States. While it is located in Washington, it is under the ownership and management of the Cascade Pacific Council, based in Beaverton, Oregon. It is the only Cascade Pacific Council camp in the state of Washington.

== History ==
The site was donated for Scouting by Clark County in the 1930s, but remained undeveloped until the 1950s. In 1958, three major improvements transformed the camp: construction of a one-mile access road, 37 adirondack sleeping shelters, and covered cooking areas.

In 1969, the Clark County Foundation for Scouting granted camp land to the Boy Scouts' Columbia Pacific Council (predecessor of today's Cascade Pacific Council).

In 1995, the camp's name was reportedly changed to Camp Teter, in honor of a former Clark County commissioner and Vancouver City councilman, Ken Teter, a lifelong Scouter who donated $100,000 for the camp's development and maintenance. The change did not last, as the name Camp Lewis was back in use the next year.

== Location and geography ==
Butte Creek Scout Ranch is located in southwest Washington near the city of Battle Ground, Washington. It is roughly half an hour north of Vancouver, Washington. The camp occupies the east bank of the East Fork of the Lewis River, across from Lewisville Park. It sits at roughly 200 feet of elevation.

== See also ==
- Butte Creek Scout Ranch
- Camp Meriwether
- Camp Pioneer
- Scouting in Oregon
