= Meriwether =

Meriwether may refer to:

== People ==
- Meriwether (name), includes a list of people with the name
- Meriwether Lewis (1774–1809), American explorer, soldier, and public administrator

== Places ==
- Meriwether, Louisville, a neighborhood in Kentucky, United States
- Meriwether, Georgia, an unincorporated community, United States
- Meriwether County, Georgia, United States

== Other ==
- SS Meriwether Lewis, a Liberty ship built in the US during World War II
- Meriwether (band), American rock band, and the title to their 2004 EP
- Meriwether National Golf Club, located near Hillsboro, Oregon
- The Meriwether, a pair of condominium towers in Portland, Oregon

== See also ==
- Camp Meriwether (disambiguation)
- Merryweather (disambiguation)
- Merriweather
