= Meriwether Clark =

Meriwether Clark may refer to:

- Meriwether Lewis Clark (1809–1879), U.S. Army officer and Confederate general in the American Civil War
- Meriwether Lewis Clark Jr. (1846–1899), American businessman and horse racing manager
