= Samuel Churchill Clark =

Confederate officer (1842–1896)

- Born: September 12, 1842; St. Louis, Missouri
- Died: March 8, 1862 (aged 19); Pea Ridge, Arkansas
- Burial place: Fairview Cemetery
- Relatives: William Clark (grandfather); George Rogers Clark (granduncle); Meriwether Lewis Clark (father); Meriwether Lewis Clark Jr. (brother); Thomas James Churchill (uncle)
- Military career
- Allegiance: Confederate States of America
- Branch: Missouri State Guard; Confederate States Army
- Service years: 1861–1862
- Rank: Captain
- Nickname: Churchy
- Unit: First Missouri Confederate Brigade
- Commands: 2nd Missouri Light Battery
- Conflicts: American Civil War; First Battle of Lexington; Battle of Pea Ridge †

Samuel Churchill Clark (September 12, 1842 – March 8, 1862) was a Confederate military officer who was killed during the American Civil War in the Battle of Pea Ridge.

== Early life ==
Samuel Churchill Clark was born in St. Louis, Missouri on September 12, 1842.

He was born to Major Meriwether Lewis Clark and Abigail Churchill. His grandfather was famed American explorer William Clark of the Lewis and Clark Expedition whose brother was George Rogers Clark. His brother was prominent St. Louis citizen Meriwether Lewis Clark Jr. and the founder of Churchill Downs. On his mother's side of the family, his uncle was the 13th Governor of Arkansas Thomas James Churchill.

== American Civil War ==
In 1859, Samuel Churchill Clark was admitted to the United States Military Academy at West Point, New York. Missouri Governor Trusten Polk was one of the several advocates who appealed to President James Buchanan on his behalf.

When he asked his father's permission to resign from the Military Academy due to the "probable secession of South Carolina from the Union," he was refused and made to assure him the idea was given up. The onset of the American Civil War led to his eventual resignation as a cadet, prompting his departure on July 1, 1861.

=== Missouri State Guard ===
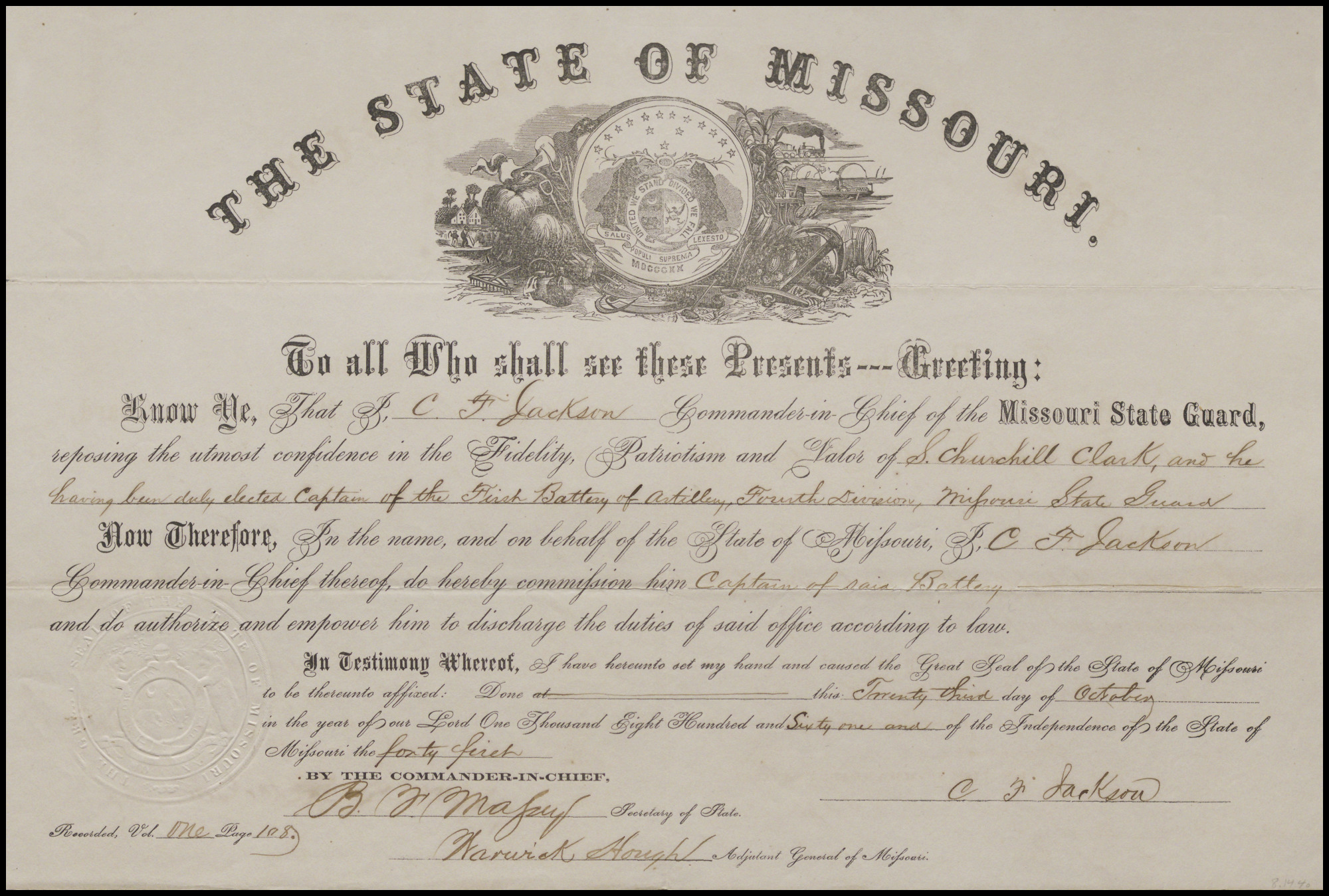
Appointment of Samuel Churchill Clark as captain of the First Battery of Artillery, 4th Division, Missouri State Guard

Enlisting as a private, Clark joined the Missouri State Guard in Lexington, Missouri. He was first assigned to the 8th Division of the MSG under James S. Rains. At the First Battle of Lexington in September 1861, he fought as an artilleryman within the Missouri forces of Major General Sterling Price. In command of two pieces of field artillery, he targeted the Masonic College building and grounds, where Union Colonel James A. Mulligan's forces had their Federal headquarters. On October 23, 1861, he was appointed captain of the 1st Battery of Artillery in the 4th Division of the State Guard under General William Y. Slack.

=== Confederate States Army ===
On January 16, 1862, the battery was reorganized by General Price for service in the Confederate States Army. Captain Clark's battery, part of the First Missouri Confederate Brigade under Colonel Henry Little, and armed with four field pieces, was the first brigade in the division overseen by Price.

=== Battle of Pea Ridge ===
During the Battle of Pea Ridge on March 7 and 8, 1862, he led the 2nd Missouri Light Battery and was among the State Guard and Confederate forces killed in action. He was killed by a Union round shot while limbering up his last gun for retreat, having already withdrawn his other guns as ordered.

== Death ==
Captain Samuel Churchill Clark died on March 8, 1862, in Pea Ridge, Arkansas. Clark's final resting place is Fairview Cemetery in Van Buren, Arkansas.

== Honors ==
In Van Buren, Arkansas, his name is engraved on the Van Buren Confederate Monument.
