= Camp Lewis =

Camp Lewis may refer to:

- Joint Base Lewis–McChord
- Camp Lewis (Montana), a former U.S. Army camp in Montana
- Camp Lewis (New Jersey), part of the Northern New Jersey Council of Scouting America
- Camp Lewis (Washington), part of the Cascade Pacific Council of Scouting America
