= Medford Council =

Medford Council may be:

- Medford Council (Oregon)
- Medford Council (Massachusetts)
