= Merryweather =

Merryweather may refer to:

== People ==
- Alice Merryweather (born 1996), American alpine skier
- Andrew Merryweather (born 1961), Australian rules footballer
- George Merryweather (1794–1870), English inventor of the tempest prognosticator, a leech-based weather predicting gadget
- James Merryweather (1929–2000), English cricketer
- John Merryweather (1932–2019), Aruban landscape architect and politician
- Julian Merryweather (born 1991), American baseball player
- Neil Merryweather (born 1945), Canadian singer, bass player and songwriter

== Others ==
- Merryweather (band), a Canadian rock band from the 1960s
- Merryweather helmet, a firefighter's helmet used by British Victorian era fire brigades
- Merryweather, a character in Disney's Sleeping Beauty
- Merryweather & Sons, British builders of steam fire engines and steam tram engines
- Irene Merryweather, fictional character appearing in the Marvel Comics universe

== See also ==
- Merriweather
- Meriwether (disambiguation)
