= Cape Lookout State Park =

State park in Oregon, United States

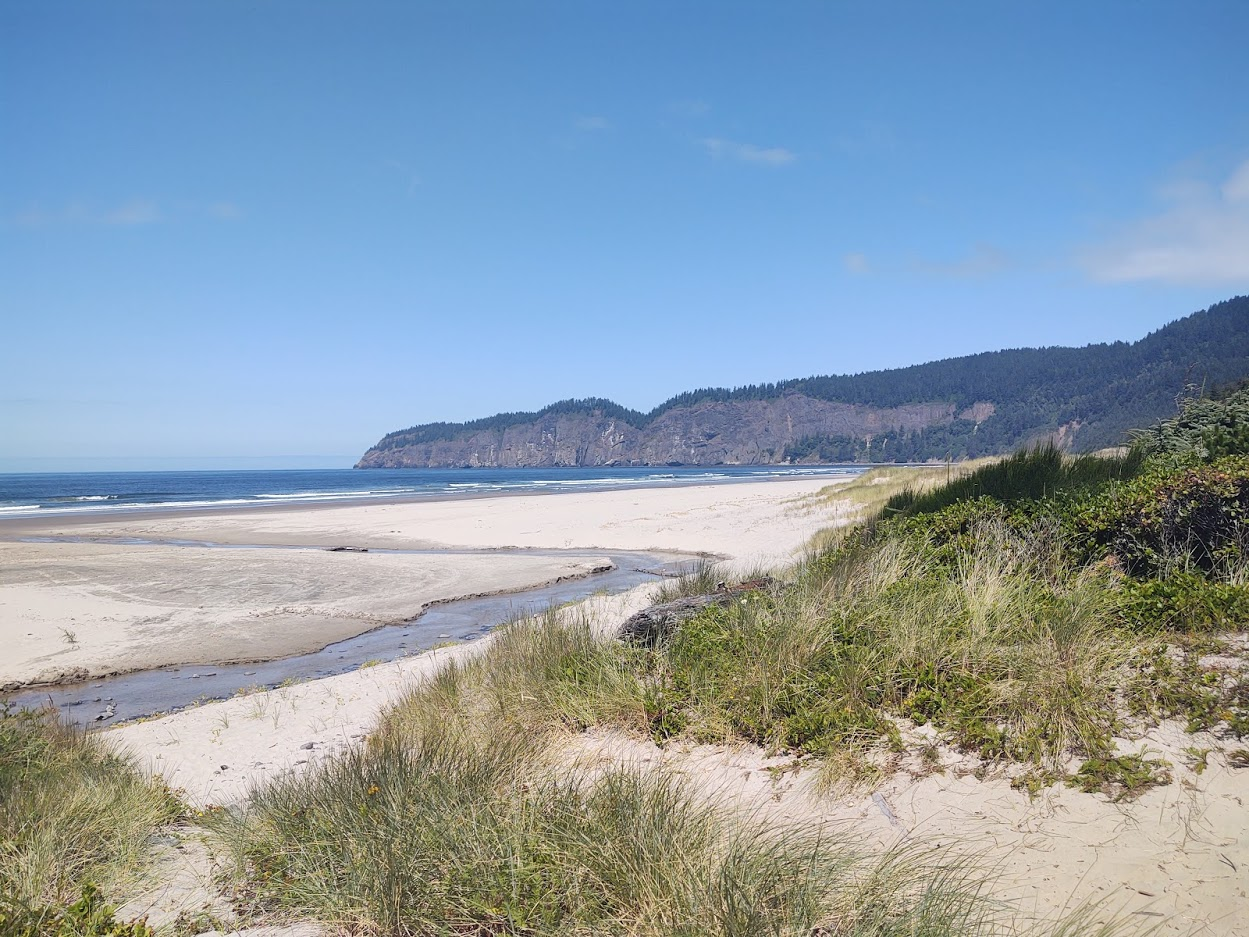
- Cape Lookout as seen from Camp Meriwether Boy Scout Camp.

- Location within Oregon Location within the United States
- Interactive map of Cape Lookout State Park
- Type: Public, state
- Location: Tillamook County, Oregon
- Nearest city: Pacific City
- Coordinates: 45°21′09″N 123°58′20″W
- Operator: Oregon Parks and Recreation Department

Cape Lookout State Park is a state park on Cape Lookout in the U.S. state of Oregon. It is located in Tillamook County, south of the city of Tillamook, on a sand spit between Netarts Bay and the Pacific Ocean.
