= Meriweather =

Meriweather is an English surname. Notable people with the surname include:

- Brandon Meriweather (born 1984), American football player in the National Football League
- Joe Meriweather (1953–2013), American basketball player

== See also ==
- Meriwether (name)
- Merriweather
