= Camp Meriwether =

Camp Meriwether may refer to:

- Camp Meriwether (Oregon), a Boy Scout summer camp south of Cape Lookout in Cloverdale, Oregon
- Camp Meriwether (Georgia) a Girl Scout summer camp in Luthersville, Georgia
