= Scouting in Oregon =

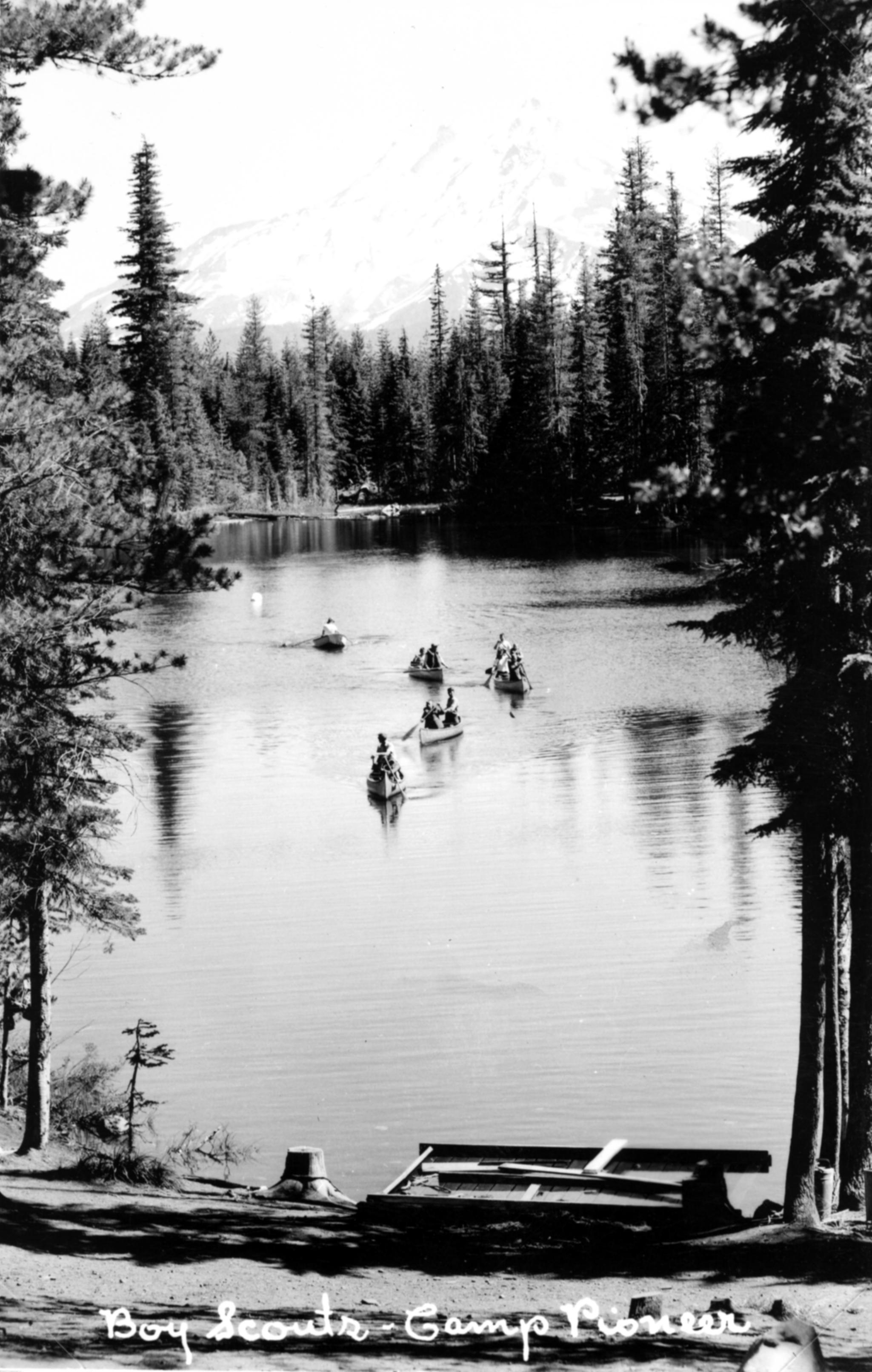
- Camp Pioneer

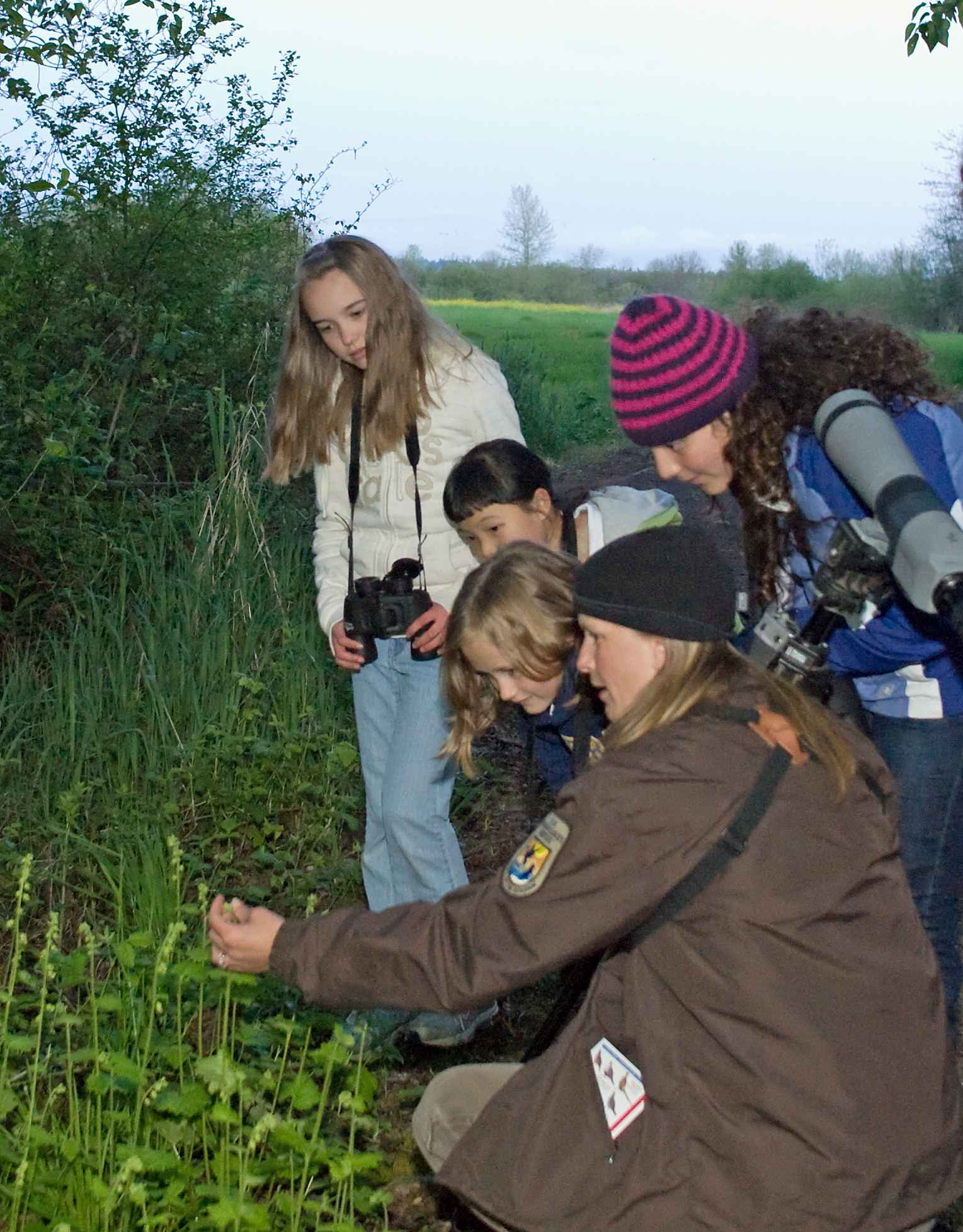
- Girl Scouts in Oregon

Scouting in the U.S. state of Oregon includes the Boy Scouts of America (BSA) and Girl Scouts (GSUSA) youth organizations, as well as newer organizations like the Baden-Powell Service Association and Vegan Scouts.

== Scouting America ==
=== History ===
The Portland Council(#492) was founded in 1916. In 1929, it changed its name to the Portland Area Council (#492), and in 1966, it changed its name again to the Columbia Pacific Council (#492). Finally, in 1993, it merged into the Cascade Pacific Council .

The Salem Council (#493) was founded in 1918. In 1923, Salem Council changed its name to the Willamette District Council (#493). Then in 1926, it changed its name once again to the Cascade Area Council (#493).

In 1926, the Umatilla Council (#738) was formed, and in 1927 it merged with the Blue Mountain Council. In 1926, the Eastern Oregon Area Council (#760) was formed, merging with Blue Mountain in 1932.

In 1921, the Lagrande Council (#494) was founded. It closed in 1924.

In 1922, the Astoria Council (#489) was founded. It changed its name to the Clatsop County Council (#489) in 1923. In 1927, the Clatsop County Council merged into the Portland Area Council (#492).

In 1922, the Corvallis Council (#493) was founded. It closed in 1924.

In 1922, Linn County Council (#491) was formed. It closed in 1924.

In 1924, the Bend Council (#651) was founded. It changed its name to the Central Oregon Council (#651) in 1925. It merged into Mid-Columbia Council (#494) in 1927.

In 1924, the Coos County Council (#490) was founded. It merged into the Douglas-Coos Council (#682) in 1926.

In 1924, The Dalles Council (#494) was founded. It changed its name to the Mid-Columbia Council (#494) in 1925. It changed its name to the Mid-Columbia-Deschutes Area Council (#617) in 1929. The council disbanded in 1934 and the area was served by Direct Service.

In 1924, the Douglas County Council (#682) was founded. It merged into the Douglas-Coos Council (#682) in 1926.

In 1924, the Klamath County Council (#746) was founded. It merged into Crater Lake Council (#491) in 1932.

In 1924, the Medford Council (#491) was founded. It changed its name to the Crater Lake Council (#491) in 1925.

In 1925, the Lane County Council (#697) was founded. It changed its name to the Wallamet Council (#697) in 1933. It changed its name again to the Oregon Trail Council (#697) in 1944.

In 1926, the Cascade Area Council (#493) was founded. It merged into the Cascade Pacific Council (#492) in 1993.

In 1926, the Douglas County Council (#490) was founded from the merger of the Coos County Council (#682) and the Douglas County Council (#682). It merged into the Willamette Council (#697) in 1933.

In 1927, the Benlinncoln Council (#490) was founded. In 1931 it was split with one half of the council going to the Cascade Area Council (#493) and the other half going to the Lane County Council (#697).

In 1936, the Modoc Area Council (#494) was founded. It merged into Crater Lake Council (#491) in 1993.

The Columbia Pacific Council (#492) merged with the Cascade Area Council (#493) to make the Cascade Pacific Council (#492) in 1993.

On September 20, 2024, it was announced that Crater Lake Council (#491) would be merging with the Oregon Trail Council (#697) to form the Pacific Crest Council (#697).

=== Blue Mountain Council ===
Blue Mountain Council (#604)
- Headquarters: Kennewick, Washington
- Country: United States
- Founded: 1923
- Website bluemountainscouts.org

With headquarters in Kennewick, Washington, the Blue Mountain Council serves Scouts in Washington and Oregon.

==== History ====
In 1923, the Blue Mountain Council (#604) was formed. In 1926, the Umatilla Council (#738) (in Oregon) was formed, merging into Blue Mountain in 1927. In 1926, the Eastern Oregon Area Council (#760) (in Oregon) was formed, merging into Blue Mountain in 1932.

==== Organization ====
The council has six districts:

- Columbia River District serves Kennewick and Finley, Washington
- Eastern Oregon District serves Baker, Wallowa, Union, Grant, and Wheeler counties, Oregon
- Oregon Trail District serves Umatilla, Wheeler, Gilliam, and Morrow counties, Oregon
- Pioneer District serves Walla Walla and Columbia Counties, Washington
- Rattlesnake Ridge District serves Richland, West Richland, and Benton City, Washington
- White Bluffs District serves Franklin County, Washington

==== Camps ====
The Council does not operate a summer camp.

- Camp Wallowa in Joseph, Oregon
- Martin Scout Camp near Pendleton and Pilot Rock, Oregon

==== Order of the Arrow ====
- Wa-La-Moot-Kin Order of the Arrow Lodge

=== Cascade Pacific Council ===
Cascade Pacific Council #492
- Owner: Boy Scouts of America
- Headquarters: Beaverton, Oregon
- Country: United States
- Founded: 1993
- Website

In 1932, the Mount Saint Helens Council (#704) merged with the Portland Area Council.

==== Organization ====
- Spirit Lake District (serving the Southern Washington Area)
- Pacific Trail District (serving the Beaverton and Hillsboro areas)
- Cascadia District (serving Portland)
- Rivers' Edge District (serving Newberg, Sherwood, and Canby)
- Santiam River District (serving the Greater Salem area)
- Timberline District (serving the area around Mount Hood)
- Mid Columbia District (serving the area around the eastern Columbia River)
- Pacific Shores District (serving the northern Oregon Coast)

==== Camps ====
The council operates a number of camps, including;

- Aubrey Watzek Lodge, a winter recreation lodge on 12 acres of property leased from the US Forest Service
- Camp Baldwin, 680 acre property 17 miles (27 km) west of Dufur in the Mount Hood National Forest
- Butte Creek Scout Ranch, a 670-acre working horse ranch south of Scotts Mills
- Camp Clark, a second camp on the Meriwether Reservation near Tillamook
- Camp Cooper, 240 acres property northwest of Willamina in the coastal forest
- Camp Ireland, 12-acre property in Hillsboro
- Camp Meriwether, 790 acre beachfront property south of Cape Lookout near Tillamook
- Nanitch Lodge, a winter recreation lodge on 8 acres of property leased from the US Forest Service
- Camp Lewis, 116 acre property near Battle Ground, Washington
- Camp Pioneer, 48 acre property east of Salem in the Mount Jefferson Wilderness, leased from the US Forest Service
- Camp Royce-Finel, 17 acre property near Astoria

==== Order of the Arrow ====
- Wauna La-Mon'tay Lodge #442 Members provide thousands of hours of service every year to Cascade Pacific Council's camps.

=== Mountain West Council ===
Mountain West Council (#106)
- Headquarters: Boise, Idaho
- Country: United States
- Website www.mountainwestcouncil.org

Mountain West Council was created with the merger of Ore-Ida Council #106 and Snake River Council #111. It serves Scouts in Idaho, Oregon, Nevada and Utah.

==== Organization ====
===== District =====
- Owyhee District
- Tapawingo District
- Snake River District

==== Camps ====
- Camp Morrison
- Camp Bradley
- Culimore High Adventure Camp
- Salmon River High Adventure Base

=== Pacific Crest Council ===
Pacific Crest Council #697
- Owner: Boy Scouts of America
- Headquarters: Eugene, Oregon
- Country: United States
- Founded: 2024
- Website

The Pacific Crest Council was formed in 2024 via a merger of the Oregon Trail Council (#697) and the Crater Lake Council (#491) The Pacific Crest serves scouts in 13 counties in Oregon and Washington.

==== Organization ====
- Chintimini District serves Benton County, Lincoln
- Cascade District serves Springfield, Cottage Grove, and eastern Lane County
- Chinook-Wacoma District serves Coos County, Curry
- Eastern District serves Deschutes, Crook, Jefferson
- Doug Fir District serves Douglas County
- Klamath District serves Klamath, Lake County
- Oregon Trail District serves Lane
- Wild River District serves Jackson, Josephine

==== Camps ====
- Camp Baker
- Camp Melakwa
- Camp Makualla is located on the shores of Crescent Lake in the heart of the Cascades and the Deschutes National Forest.
- Camp McLoughlin is located on the northwestern shoreline of Lake of the Woods of the Fremont-Winema National Forests.

==== Order of the Arrow ====
- Tsisqan Lodge #253
- Lo La'Qam Geela Lodge #491
- Future: Kunamokst Lodge #697

== Girl Scouting in Oregon ==
Girl Scouting in Oregon
- Map of Girl Scout Councils in Oregon

There are two Girl Scout councils serving girls in Oregon.

=== Girl Scouts of Silver Sage ===
Serves girls in Malheur County, Oregon with headquarters in Boise, Idaho.

=== Girl Scouts of Oregon and Southwest Washington ===
Girl Scouts of Oregon and Southwest Washington
- Owner: Girl Scouts of the USA
- Headquarters: Portland, Oregon
- Country: United States
- Founded: 2008
- Website girlscoutsosw.org

Formed by the merger of Girl Scouts - Columbia River Council, Girl Scouts of Santiam Council, Girl Scouts of Western Rivers Council, and Girl Scouts of Winema Council in October 2008.

==== Service centers in Oregon ====
- Bend
- Eugene
- Medford
- Portland

Program centers:

- Albany Program Center is located in a residential section of Albany.
- Lebanon Program Center is a converted schoolhouse located in Lebanon.
- Newport Program Center is located in residential Newport near the beach and the Oregon Coast Aquarium.
- Seaside Program Center is located in residential Seaside near the beach.

==== Summer resident camps ====
- Camp Arrowhead is 260 acres (1.1 km^{2}) located in the Gorge near Stevenson, Washington. Camp Arrowhead has 260 acres of forest, meadows, trails, and a lake. It was opened in 1948.
- Camp Cleawox is located two miles south of Florence in the Oregon Dunes National Recreation Area. This 47 acres (190,000 m^{2}) site is situated on a freshwater lake. Girl Scouts first started camping there before 1930 and in 1938/1939 substantial work was done by the Civilian Conservation Corps. The property was also leased by other groups until 1949.
- Camp Whispering Winds is located in the forested hills of Kings Valley. The camp includes 220 acres (0.89 km^{2}) and a central lake.

Outdoor Program Centers:

- The Homestead Outdoor Program Center is 32 acres (130,000 m^{2}) located on the historically significant Creighton Homestead in Rhododendron at the base of Mount Hood.
- Mountaindale Outdoor Program Center is located off Sunset Highway in North Plains. Mountaindale has 50 acres (200,000 m^{2}) of woods, a meadow, and a pond.
- Ruth Hyde Outdoor Program Center is 90 acres (360,000 m^{2}) about seven miles west of Grants Pass.

== Baden-Powell Service Association ==
The Baden-Powell Service Association has six chartered groups in the Portland, Oregon area—more than any other city in the United States.

== See also ==
- Scouting in Idaho
- The Scout (Portland, Oregon)
