= Pine Ridge Lake (Oregon) =

Lake in Oregon, United States

- OA Lake, Scout Lake
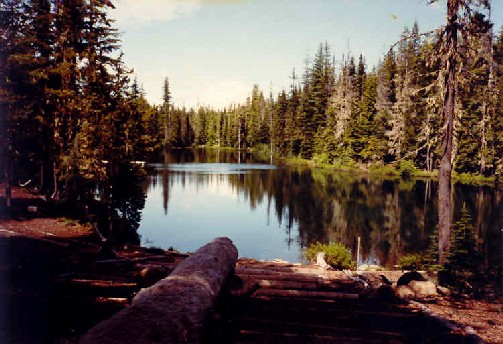
- Picture of Pine Ridge in 1983

- Location within Oregon Location within the United States Location within North America
- Location: Willamette National Forest, Linn County, Oregon
- Coordinates: 44°33′28″N 121°55′53″W
- Primary inflows: Glacial runoff and Rainfall
- Primary outflows: Evaporation
- Average depth: 19 ft (5.8 m)
- Surface elevation: 4,875 ft (1,486 m)

Pine Ridge Lake is a lake located near Camp Pioneer, a Scouts BSA camp, and is the trailhead for Pine Ridge Trail #3443, which connects to Marion Lake and other parts of the Mount Jefferson Wilderness, and is in close proximity to the Pacific Crest Trail.

The name Scout Lake is sometimes (incorrectly) used for Pine Ridge. In fact, Scout Lake is about 3 miles (4.8 km) from Pine Ridge, and was supposed to be the site of the summer camp. OA Lake is a significantly smaller lake, about 300 feet from Pine Ridge that is not stocked, and does not permit swimming.

While not usually open to the general public, this lake is still stocked with Rainbow trout, Cutthroat trout, and/or Brook trout. This lake is also known for its view of Mount Jefferson, located around 14 miles away. In the summertime, due to the stagnant nature of parts of the lake, it becomes heavily populated by Mosquitos.

A quirk of this lake is it has an emergency pumphouse that drains water straight from the lake, instead of the wells surrounding it. The lake (and surrounding camp) has been used as a basecamp for fighting the frequent forest fires in the area. In 2002, a forest fire temporarily closed the summer camp, with the United States Forest Service using the camp as a command post to fight the fire.
