= Cape Lookout (Oregon) =

Promontory in northwestern Oregon, US

Coordinates: 45.339546°N 123.992901°W

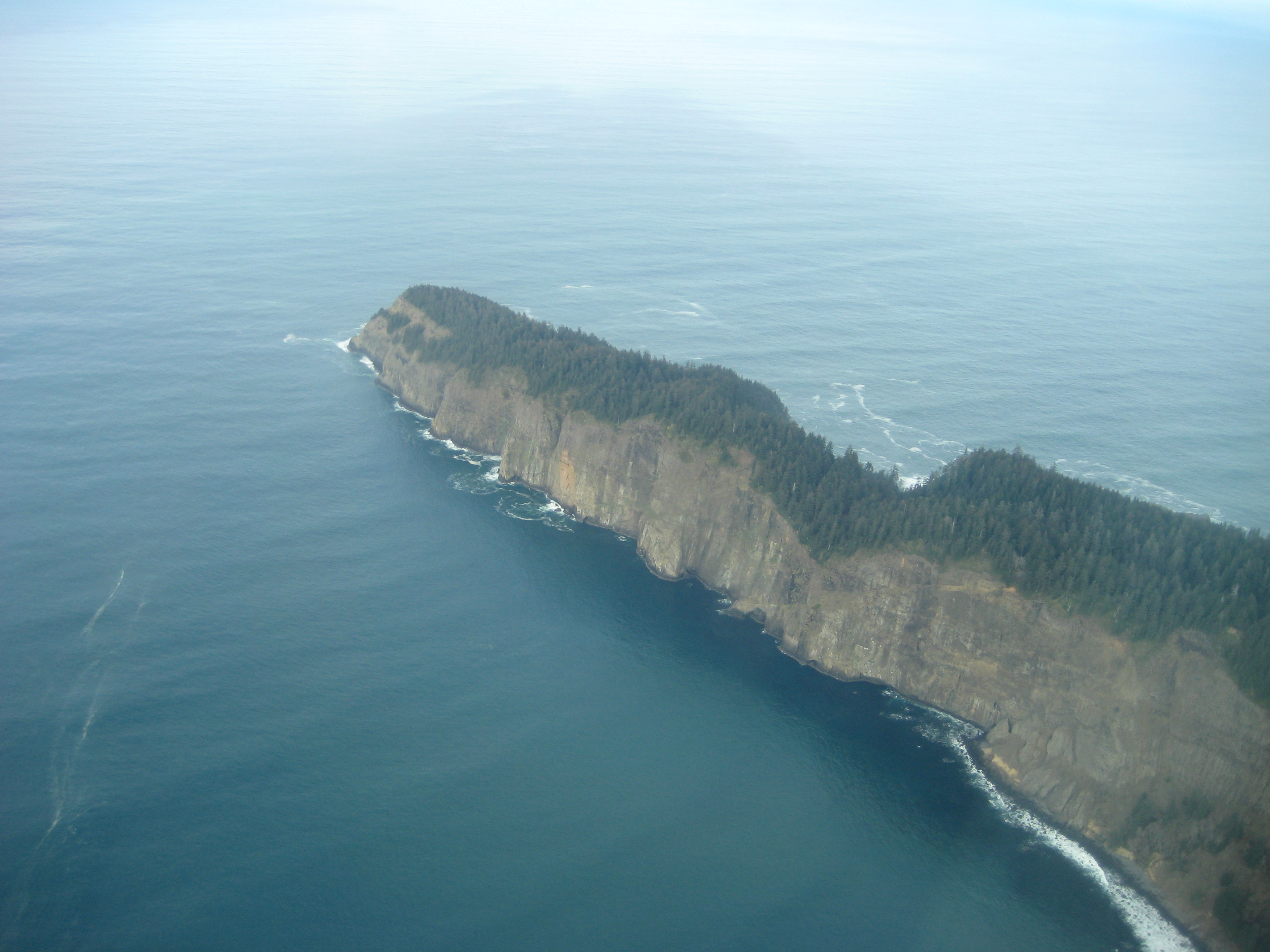
Cape Lookout from the Southeast

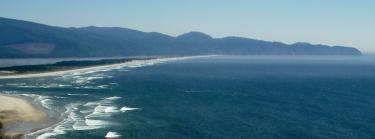
Cape Lookout from the north

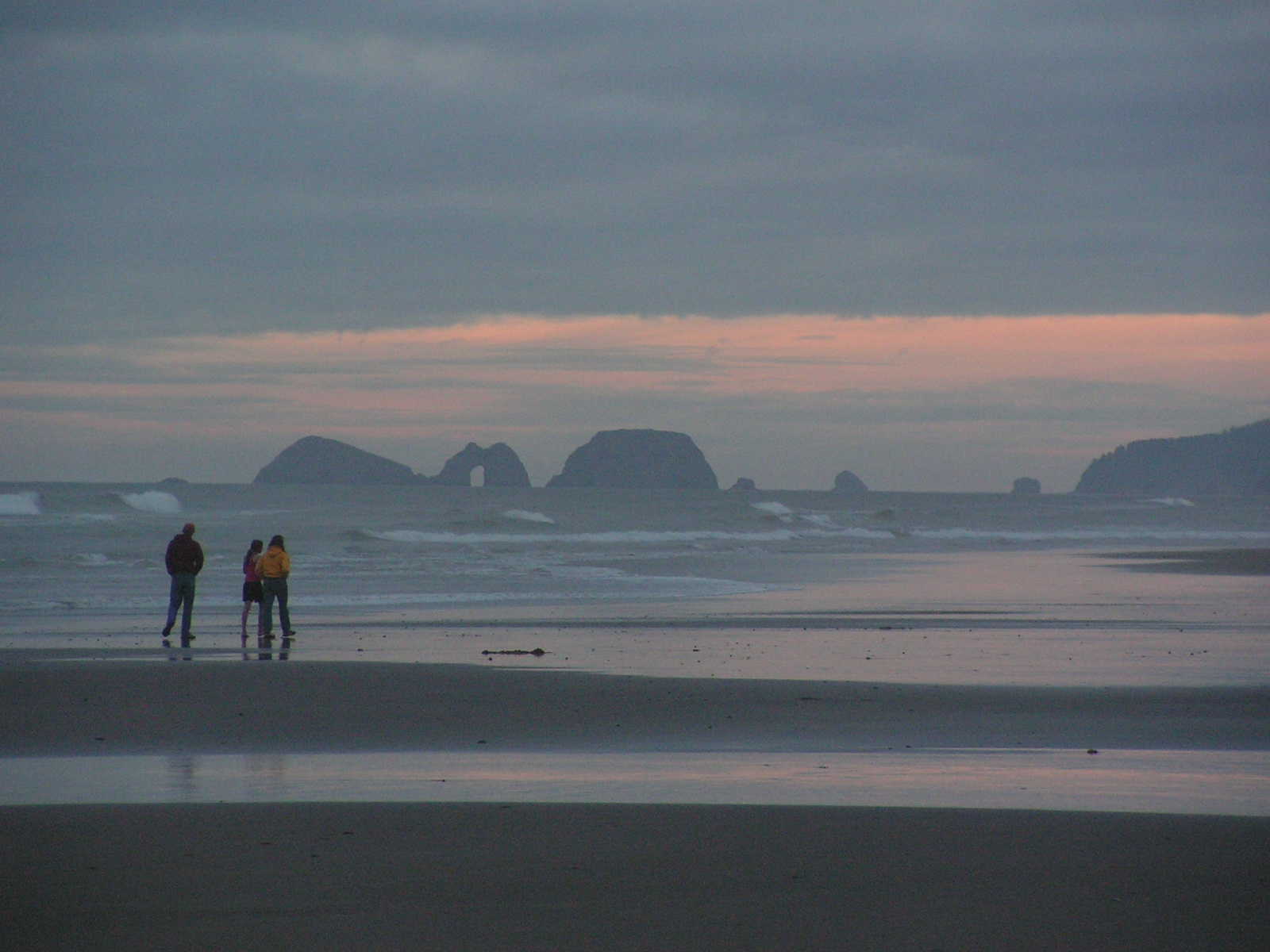
Dusk at Cape Lookout

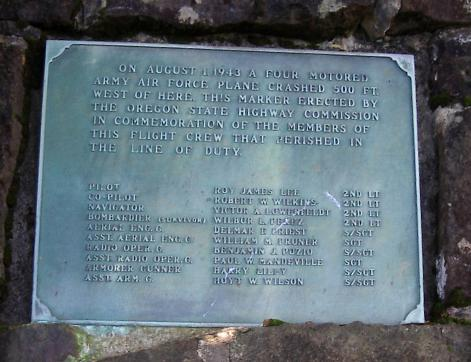
Plaque about the World War II B-17 aircraft that crashed on Cape Lookout

Cape Lookout is a sharp rocky promontory along the Pacific Ocean coast of northwestern Oregon in the United States. It is located in southwestern Tillamook County, approximately 10 miles (16 km) southwest of Tillamook, just south of Netarts Bay. The promontory extends 1.5 miles (2.4 km) perpendicular to the coast, and is approximately 0.5 miles (0.80 km) wide at its base, tapering as it extends outward from the coast. Cape Lookout State Park is located on the north side of the promontory, which is part of the Siuslaw National Forest. Cape Lookout Road travels past the base of the cape. Cape Lookout is a member of Tillamook's Three Capes Scenic Drive.

The Cape Lookout Trail is a popular hiking trail, extending 2.5 miles (4.0 km) through Sitka spruce forest to the tip of the promontory. The cliff-top hiking trail offers views of Cape Kiwanda and Cascade Head to the south as well as Cape Meares, Three Arch Rocks, and Neahkahnie Mountain to the north. Migrating whales can also be seen, generally from December through June, as they pass the end of the cape.

The cape was named on July 6, 1788, by British fur trader John Meares, who was sailing south from Nootka Island, Canada in search of trade. During World War II, the cape was the location of a notable crash of a B-17 Flying Fortress bomber. There was one survivor (the bombardier), Wilbur L. Perez. A plaque on the cape memorializes the victims of the crash, which occurred in 1943.

== See also ==
- Camp Meriwether (Oregon)
