= Camp Pioneer (Oregon) =

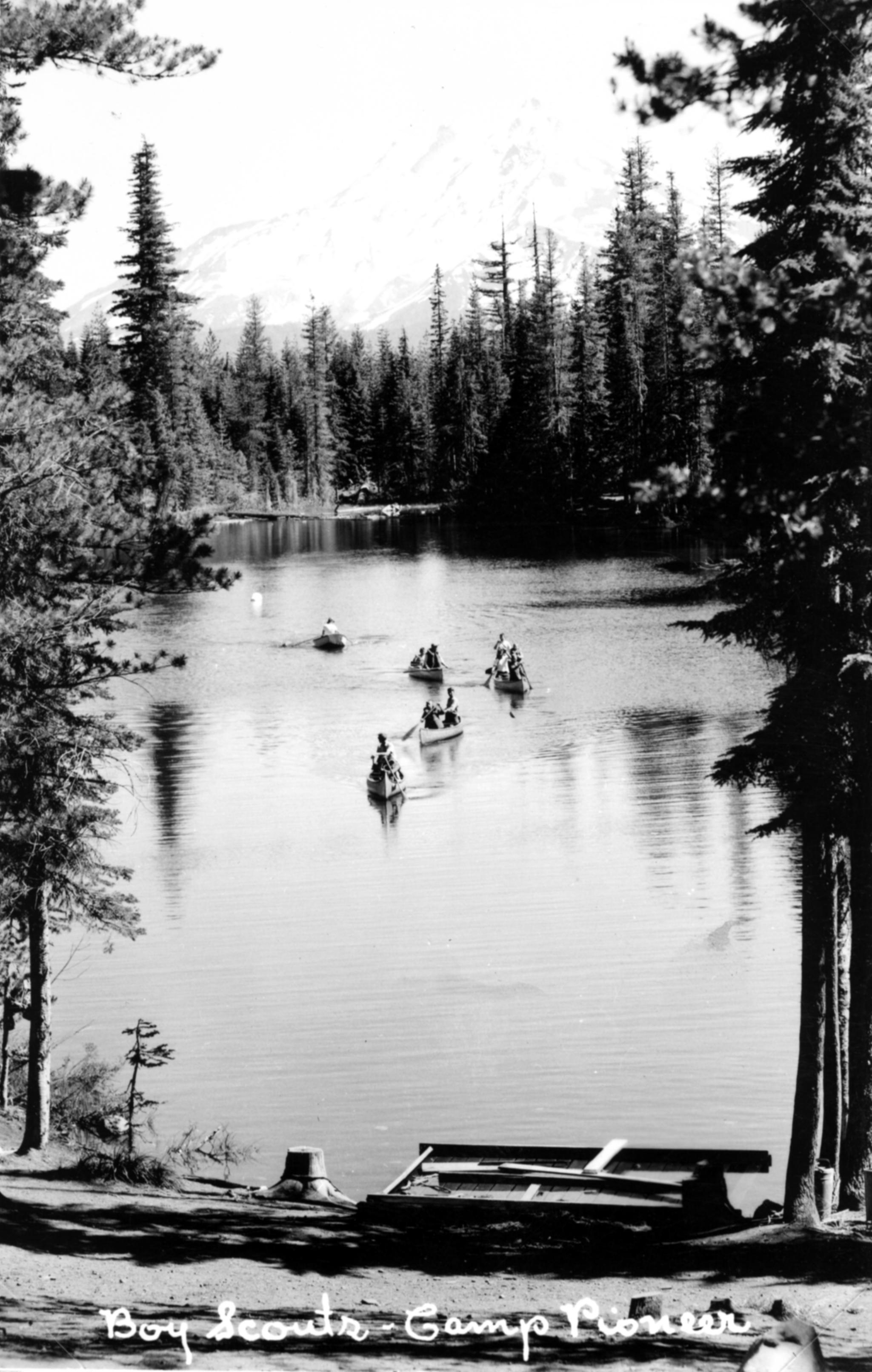
- Camp Pioneer circa 1953
- Owner: Cascade Pacific Council
- Location: Willamette National Forest
- Country: United States
- Founded: 1936
- Founder: Cap Monroe
- Website cpcbsa.org/project/camp-pioneer/

Camp Pioneer is a Boy Scouts of America camp located in the Mount Jefferson Wilderness area within the Willamette National Forest in Oregon. It is operated by the Cascade Pacific Council of Boy Scouts of America. The camp is located south of Marion Forks, east Oregon Route 22.

== History ==
Camp Pioneer was founded in 1936 by Cascade Pacific Council councilman Cap Monroe and a group of Eagle Scouts from a troop in Albany, Oregon. In 2002, a forest fire temporarily closed the camp, with the United States Forest Service using the camp as a command post to fight the fire. In 2003, the camp was threatened by the B&B Complex Fires. Fire fighting crews were able to protect the camp from damage.

== Camp ==
Pioneer is situated around Pine Ridge Lake, elevation 4,875 ft (1486 m) at the base of Mt. Jefferson, near the Pacific Crest Trail and Mount Jefferson Wilderness Area. Many of the camp employees are college and high school students working during their summer break. The name "Pine Ridge" can be seen at Camp Meriwether (Oregon) as the name of one of their campsites.

== See also ==
- Scouting in Oregon
- Butte Creek Scout Ranch
- Camp Meriwether
