= Camp Meriwether (Oregon) =

Scout camp in Oregon, United States

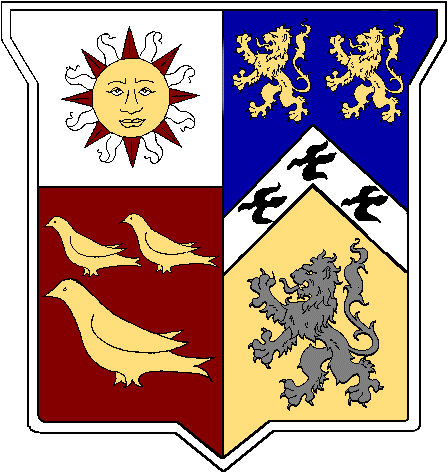
- The Camp Meriwether Crest
- Owner: Cascade Pacific Council
- Location: Cloverdale, Oregon Coast
- Country: United States
- Coordinates: 45.319167°N 123.963889°W
- Camp size: 695 acres (281 ha)
- Founded: 1926
- Founder: George Obertueffer
- Website www.cpcbsa.org/meriwether

Camp Meriwether is a 790-acre Scouts BSA summer camp founded in 1926 and located south of Cape Lookout near Cloverdale, Oregon, along the Oregon Coast. Camp Meriwether is the largest of the Cascade Pacific Council's four resident camps in Oregon. During World War II, the camp was closed for two years and served as a US Army outpost until 1943.

== Early years ==
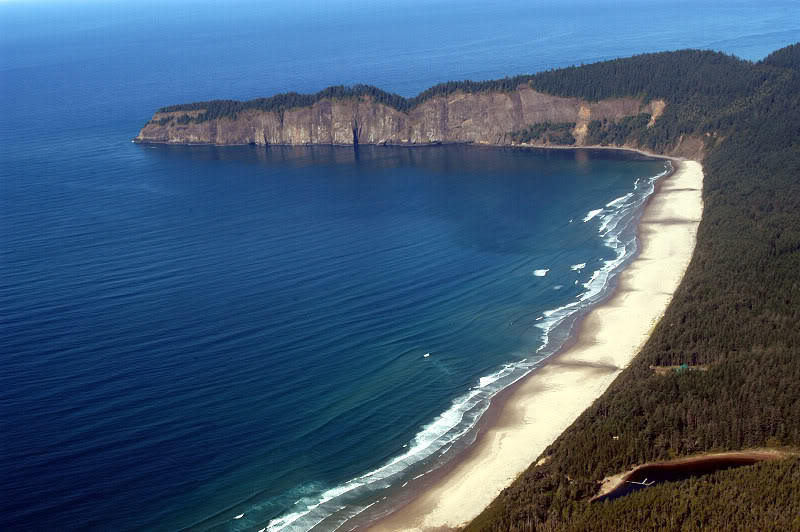
Camp Meriwether's Western Half

The land upon which Camp Meriwether sits was purchased in 1926 by Scout Executive George "Chief Obie" Obertueffer of the Portland Area Council. The site was owned by Ernst A. Chamberlain, who sold 408 acres (165 ha) of the land and donated an additional 80 acres (32 ha). Philanthropist and chairperson of the committee Aubrey R. Watzek provided the $5,000 down payment for the purchase. Following a fire and the destruction of the lodge at Camp Chinidere, near Wahtum Lake on Mt. Hood, the council began to look for a new property. Oberteuffer was able to persuade the council to purchase the land from the Chamberlain family for $21,000 (when the operating budget for the council was $26,000). The camp was named for Meriwether Lewis, of the Lewis and Clark Expedition of 1804. The camp to the north of Camp Meriwether is Camp Clark, which runs a similar program but for Cub Scouts. The combined camps make the Meriwether-Clark Scout Reservation and over 1,000 acres of land along with two miles of private access beach.

== Location and geography ==
Camp Meriwether is located between Cape Lookout (to the North) and Cape Kiwanda (to the South), along the Oregon Coast near the town of Cloverdale, Oregon. This location between the two capes creates a strong outward current that is also known as a rip current, which can make swimming in the area dangerous. The two miles of coastal beach adjacent to the Meriwether-Clark Scout Reservation can be accessed by hiking from a parking lot near the top of the cape or by walking North from Sand Lake Recreation Area. This makes for one of the most secluded beaches in Oregon. A weekly service project also makes this one of the cleanest beaches during the summer camp season.

=== Cape Lookout ===
Cape Lookout is a sharp rocky promontory along the Pacific Ocean coast of northwestern Oregon in the United States. It is located in the southwestern Tillamook County, approximately 10 mi (16 km) southwest of Tillamook, just south of Netarts Bay. The promontory extends 1 mi (1.6 km) perpendicular to the coast, and is approximately 0.25 mi (0.5 km) wide at its base, tapering as it extends outward from the coast. Cape Lookout State Park is located on the north side of the promontory, which is part of the Siuslaw National Forest and Camp Meriwether is located to the south. The Cape Lookout Trail is a popular hiking trail, extending 2.5 miles through Sitka spruce forest to the tip of the promontory. The cliff-top viewpoint offers views of Cape Kiwanda and Cascade Head to the south, and Cape Meares and Neahkahnie Mountain to the north. Migrating whales can also be seen, generally from December through June. During World War II, the cape was the location of a notable crash of a B-17 Flying Fortress bomber. There was one survivor (the bombardier), Wilbur L. Perez who died in 2009. A plaque on the cape memorializes the victims of the crash. Information is taken from Cape Lookout.

=== Wells Cove ===
Named after Kenneth Wells, one of the original staff members at Camp Meriwether and a staff member at Camp Chinidere when the dining hall burnt down in 1925, Wells was one of the first people to discover a small opening at the easternmost face of Cape Lookout that at low tide revealed a small cove that one could walk into and explore. Time and traffic have eroded the trail heading down to Wells Cove but with careful planning and keeping the tides in mind, one can still trek down to the cove. Apart from having a cove named after him, Kenneth Wells is the author of Camp Meriwether's only historical book entitled "An early history of Camp Meriwether: With some additional notes about Obie (G. H. Oberteuffer) and the Columbia Pacific Council's early years". His memoir of historical events and personal experiences was written for 60th anniversary of Camp Meriwether. In the Obie Rangers program (a leadership comprehensive Trail to First Class program at Camp Meriwether) the highest honor a Scout can receive is the "Kenneth Wells Award for Individual Excellence", which is awarded to Scouts that participated in the program and demonstrated the most leadership and initiative.

=== Chamberlain Lake ===
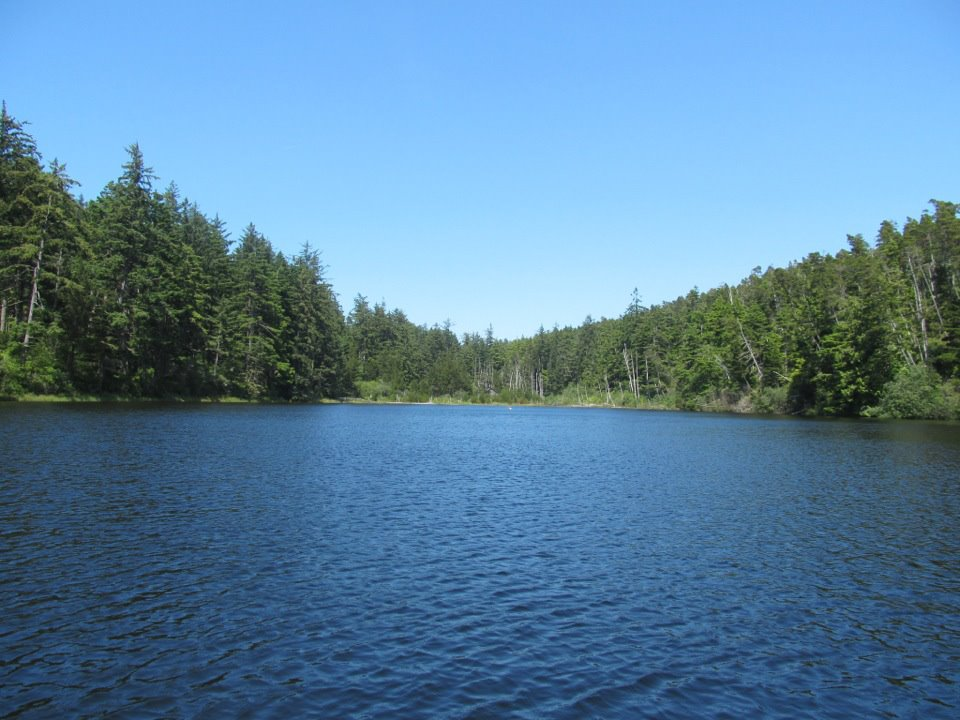
Chamberlain Lake, Camp Meriwether

Chamberlain Lake is the small coastal freshwater lake located on the Camp Meriwether property. It is the largest lake in Cascade Pacific Council and is the home to the waterfront area. In the early years of camp, the lake was home to the S.S.S. Lion, a building on the shore that was made to look like a ship. Complete with masts, pilothouse, and galley, the ship was home to Sea Scout campers who bunked and prepared meals on board. Other locations of importance near Chamberlain Lake include the campfire bowl, which is located on the west face of the lake, and an ecology learning center at the north end. Also on the north end is a rare self-sustaining poor fen populated with wild cranberries and carnivorous plants.

== Historical events ==
=== Military presence at Camp Meriwether ===
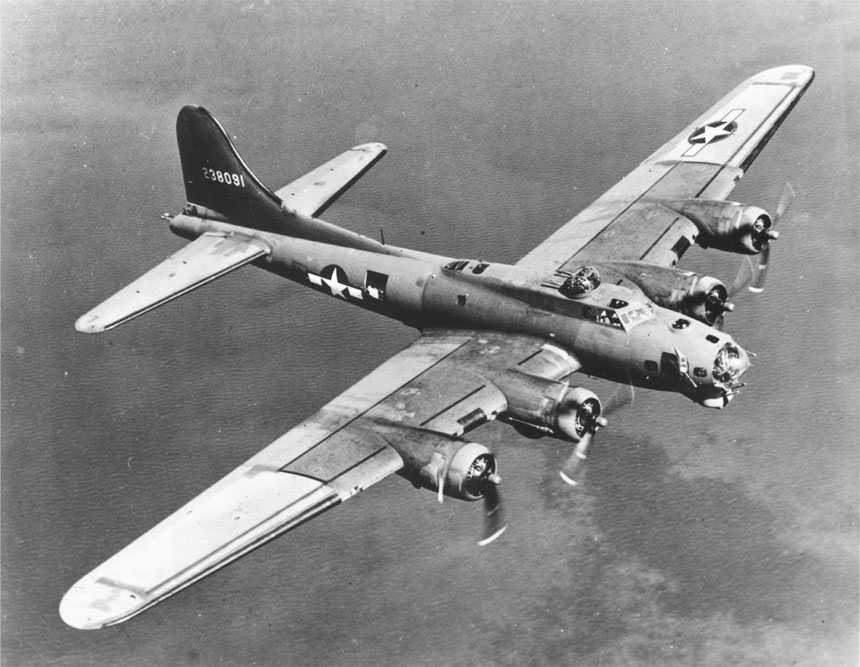
A B-17 bomber, similar to the one that crashed into Cape Lookout

From 1942 through 1943 during World War II, Camp Meriwether was shut down as a Boy Scout Camp and used as a United States Army outpost along with a temporary home for the United States Coast Guard. Roads constructed by the National Guard and Coast Guard still function as main roads at Camp Meriwether. Also, there is a distinctive slash through the trees that was cut for telegraph lines and there are turret mounts located at the top of the present day flagpole and parade grounds. Several alumni proclaim that the camp used to have the machine guns that were mounted there but those have since then been lost. These Browning M2 guns may have come from the wreckage noted in the following paragraph, and were located on top of the Big Lodge fireplace mantle piece.

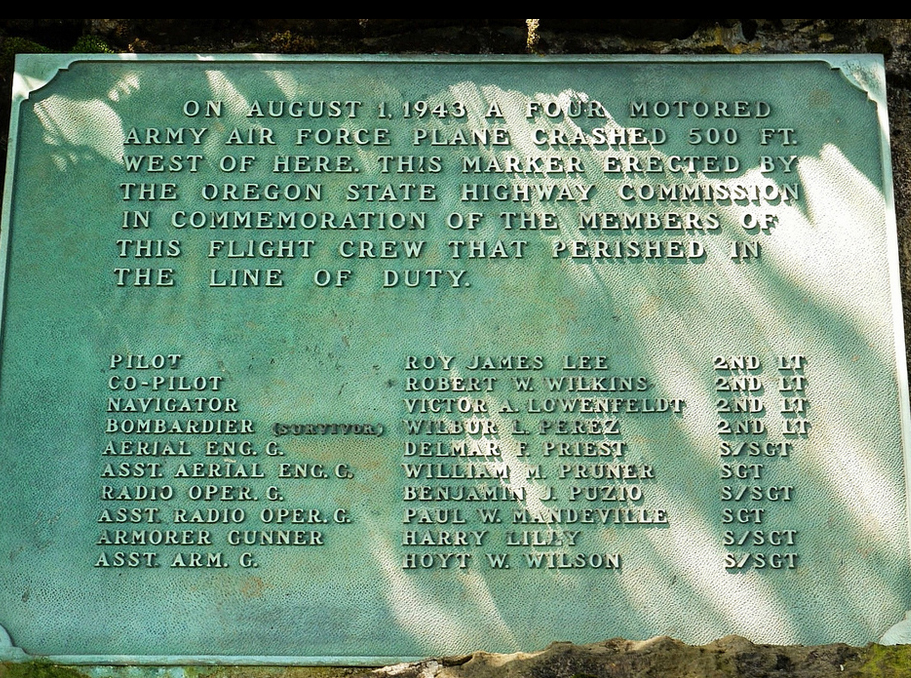
The plaque on Cape Lookout in memoriam of the B-17 Plane crash

On 1 August 1943 a Boeing B-17F-95-BO Flying Fortress, 42–30326, c/n 5440, of the 541st Bomb Squadron, 383d Bomb Group, piloted by Roy J. Lee, was headed north up the Oregon coast on a routine patrol flight. The plane had left Pendleton Field, near Pendleton, Oregon, at 0900 and was tasked with flying to Cape Disappointment on the Washington coast. They were then to fly 500 miles out to sea, followed by a direct flight back to Pendleton Field. On arriving at the coast, the crew found the entire area hidden in overcast clouds that extended to an elevation of 8000 feet. The pilot decided to locate Cape Disappointment by flying below the overcast. The overcast proved to reach almost to the level of the sea. The plane was flying at about 50–150 feet above the waves. Deciding that the risk was too great the crew began to climb back up into the overcast. Unfortunately, the plane crashed into the side of Cape Lookout at about 900 feet in elevation. The Aviation Archeological Investigation & Research website lists the crash date as 2 August. Parts of the bomber can still be seen today. The lone survivor Wilbur Perez lived for another sixty six years before dying on March 20, 2009 in Escondido, California.

=== Deaths ===
A 16 year-old camp staffer, Christopher Kroker, was killed on August 1, 2003 when a ceremonial saluting cannon he was attempting to fire exploded. A conclusive cause of the accident was not determined, but possible causes included metal fatigue, barrel corrosion, use of incorrect powder type, and improper loading. Contributing factors in the accident included a lack of written procedures, inconsistent training, and inadequate supervision. As a result of the incident, the Cascade Pacific Council was cited by the State of Oregon for several safety failures and fined $11,500. A 2021 change to the Guide to Safe Scouting removed an exception to the list of prohibited activities for the use of cannons at council camp ceremonies.

== Golf Course Controversy ==
In late 2015, council executive Matt Devore unveiled Cascade Pacific Council's plans in the works to lease 200 acres of the coastal property for 50 years to Mike Keizer, a golf course developer. The lease is due to a multimillion-dollar maintenance deferral for properties and operating costs of a council that has seen a drop of nearly 25,000 registered youth since 2004, when Camp Meriwether's current dining hall was built. The proposal was met with opposition from conservation groups like the Oregon Coast Alliance and the Oregon Shores Conservation Coalition along with several in the scouting community. Over 4,000 people signed a petition opposing the project on Change.org. In April 2017, the decision to develop a golf course was alleviated due to delays in the letter of intent signage, probability of the proposed project moving forward, and differences in ideas for the use of the property.

== See also ==
- Scouting in Oregon
- Butte Creek Scout Ranch
- Camp Pioneer
