= Butte Creek Scout Ranch =

Scout camp in Oregon, United States

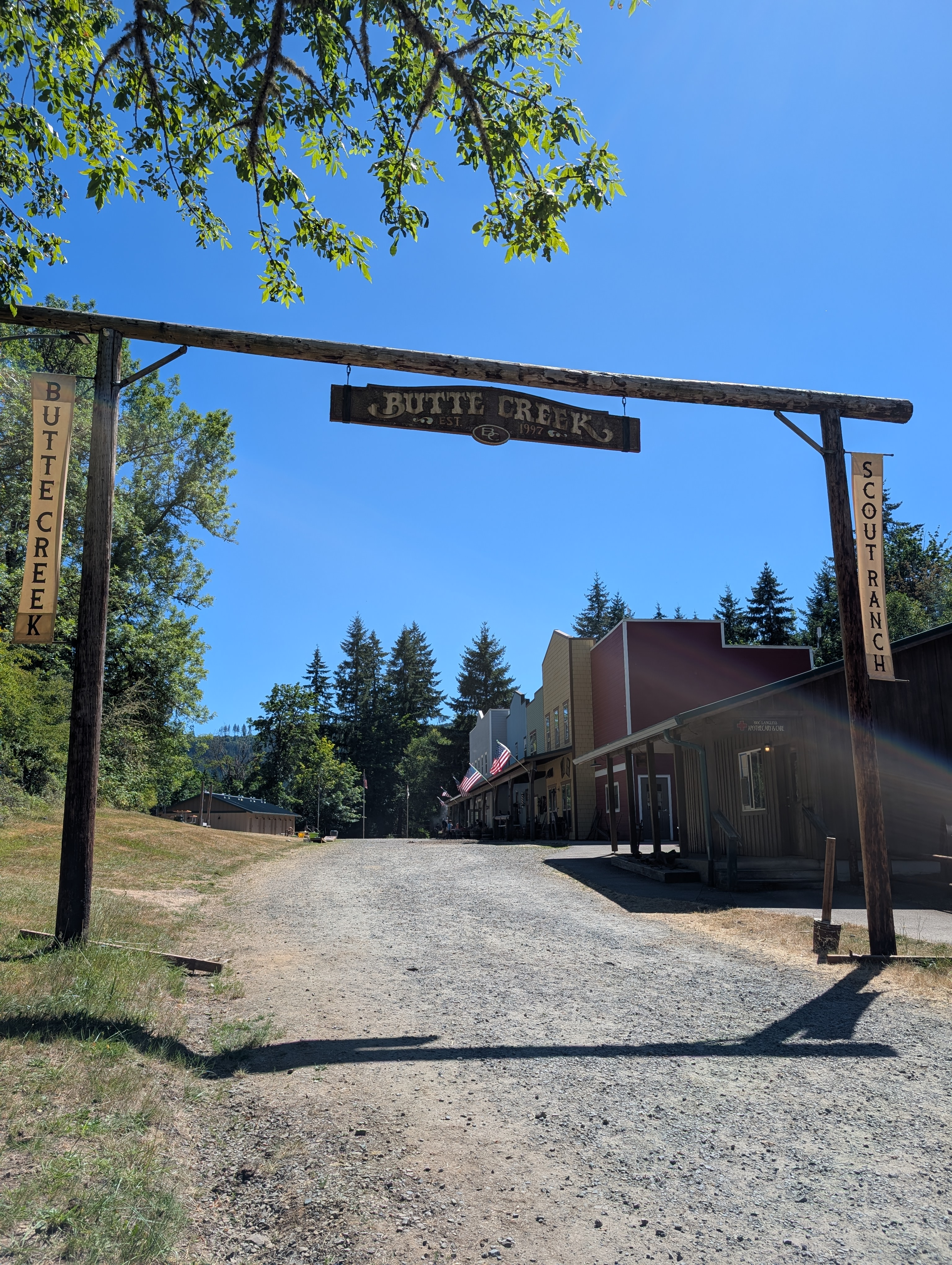
- Entrance arch to Butte Creek's Main Street
- Owner: Cascade Pacific Council
- Location: Scotts Mills, Oregon
- Country: United States
- Coordinates: 45.0036°N 122.592°W
- Camp size: 620 acres (250 ha)
- Founded: 1968
- Website cpcscouting.org/project/butte-creek/

Butte Creek Scout Ranch is a 620-acre Scouting America camp located near Scotts Mills, Oregon, United States.

== History ==
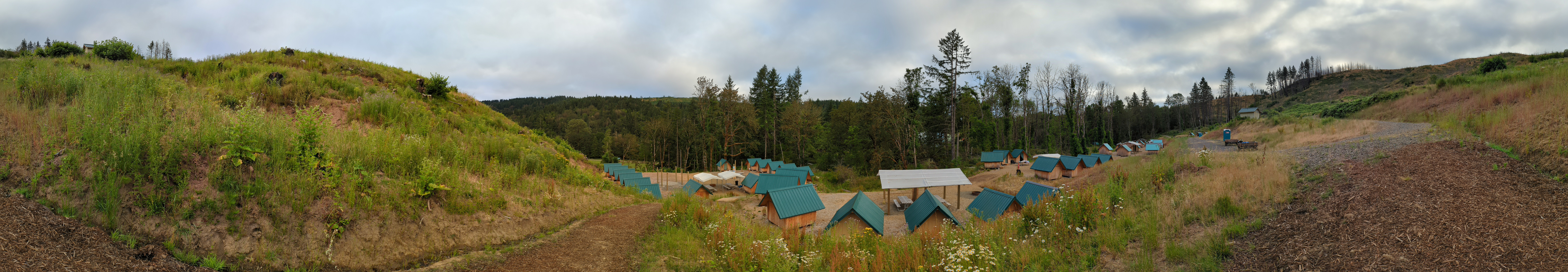
Butte Creek campsites with mini-Adirondack shelters

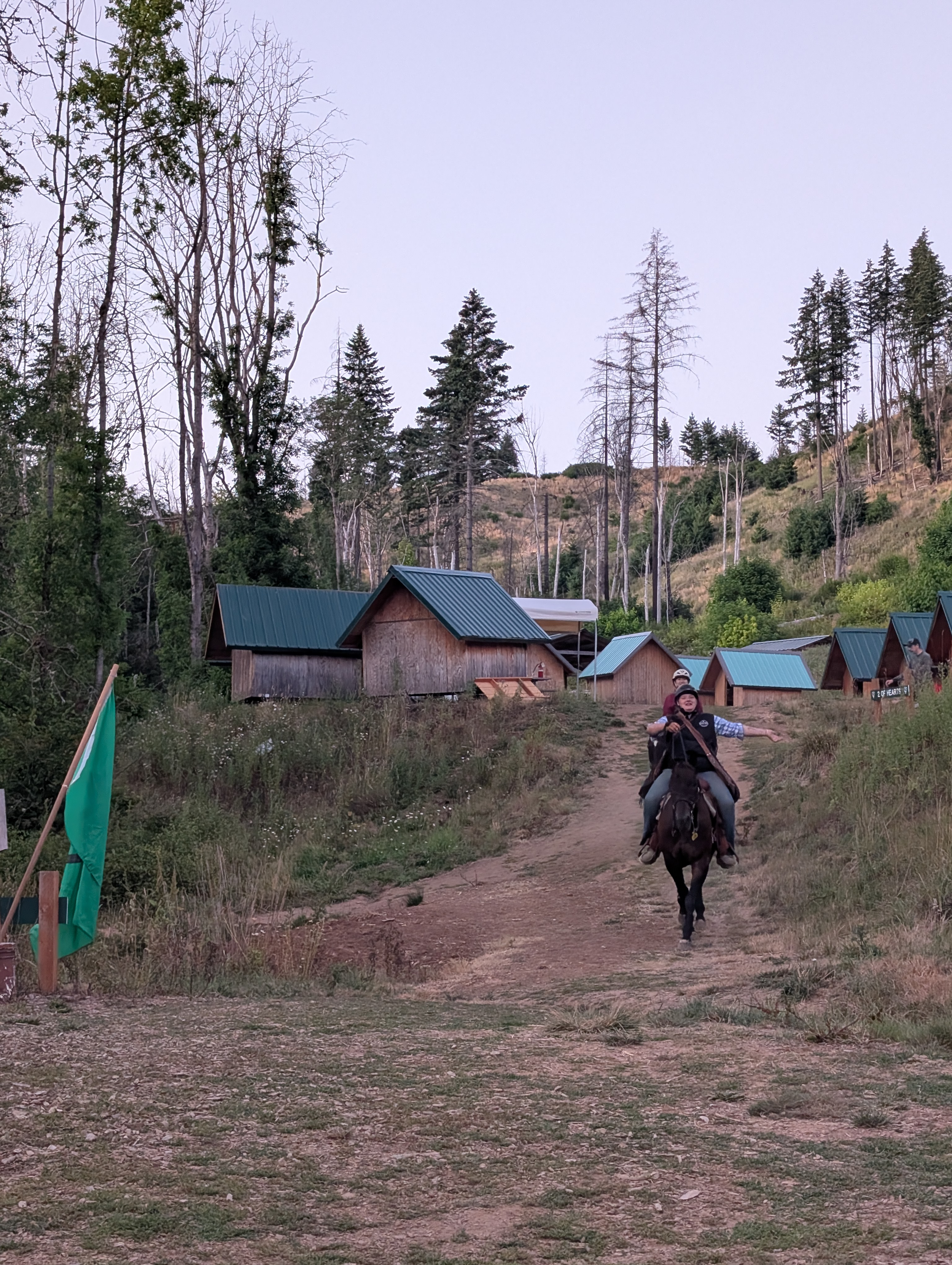
Butte Creek wranglers ride into a campsite to deliver mail, known at camp as Pony Express

The camp property was originally purchased in 1968 by Salishan Lodge developer John Gray and later donated to Scouting. In 1994, the Cascade Pacific Council began developing a 27-acre section of the ranch for use as a Cub Scout summer camp, originally planned to open for the summer of 1996 at a proposed cost of $1.1 million. This work included a 6,000 square foot dining hall with an Old-West style hotel facade, anchoring the camp's Main Street. In 2007, an indoor horse arena was built to expand the camp's horsemanship program.

The 2020 Beachie Creek Fire caused significant damage to campsites on the eastern side of the ranch, destroying structures and burning down trees. Fortunately, shifting winds stopped the fire at Main Street, preventing damage to the dining hall and other camp structures to the west. The fire also forced the relocation of 32 of the ranch's horses to Tangent, Oregon.

== Programs ==
Butte Creek Scout Ranch operates an annual summer camp for Cub Scouts, youth in kindergarten through fifth grade, and year-round camping for Scouting America and other groups. Campers stay in iconic, two-person mini-adirondack cabins (also known as "mini-daks"). The camp's Old-West theme and herd of horses anchor its year-round horse program which includes horsemanship training, riding, and equine-assisted therapy. Horse programs at the camp are operated by the Butte Creek Wranglers Association, a Scouting America Venturing crew focused on horsemanship.

The pinnacle of these horse programs are the annual horse treks. Around 50 horses from Butte Creek's herd spend the summer at Camp Baldwin, supporting horsemanship programs there. Rather than getting hauled between the camps via trailer, since the mid-1980s, the Cascade Pacific Council has organized week-long, 160-mile horseback rides to move the horses each summer. An eastbound trek in June brings the horses to Baldwin and a westbound August trek brings them home. Scouts, ages 13 and up, are eligible to participate in the treks and are responsible for all aspects of horse care including feeding, brushing, saddling, and bridling.

== Location and geography ==
Butte Creek Scout Ranch is located in northwest Oregon near the town of Scotts Mills, Oregon. It is roughly an hour east of Salem, Oregon. The camp occupies both sides of Butte Creek.

== See also ==
- Camp Meriwether
- Camp Pioneer
- Scouting in Oregon
