= David Meriwether =

David Meriwether may refer to:

- David Meriwether (Georgia politician) (1755–1822), Revolutionary War soldier and Representative from Georgia
- David Meriwether (Kentucky politician) (1800–1893), Senator from Kentucky and also Governor of Territorial New Mexico
