= Merriweather =

Merriweather is a surname derived from the Middle English merie, meaning 'merry pleasant' and wether, meaning weather.

== Notable people with the surname "Merriweather" include ==
- Alfred Merriweather (1918–1999), British missionary and politician
- Big Maceo Merriweather (1905–1953), American musician
- Brian Merriweather (born 1978), American basketball player
- Daniel Merriweather (born 1982), Australian singer-songwriter
- Ellis Merriweather (born 1999), American football player
- Kaevon Merriweather (born 1999), American football player
- Katrina Merriweather (born 1979), American basketball coach
- Lester Julian Merriweather (born 1978), American collagist, painter
- Marjorie Merriweather Post (1887–1973), American entrepreneur
- Mike Merriweather (born 1960), American football player
- William Merriweather Peña (1919–2018), American architect

== See also ==
- Marjorie Merriweather Post (1887–1973), an American businesswoman
  - Merriweather Post Pavilion, a pavilion named after her
- Merriweather (typeface), a serif typeface
- Meriweather, a page for people with the surname "Meriweather"
- Meriwether (name), a page for people with the surname "Meriwether"
