= Meriwether Lewis Clark Jr. =

American horse racing executive (1846–1899)

- Born: January 27, 1846
- Died: April 22, 1899 (aged 53)
- Resting place: Cave Hill Cemetery, Louisville, Kentucky, U.S.
- Occupation: Businessman
- Relatives: Meriwether Lewis Clark Sr. (father); William Clark (grandfather); Samuel Churchill Clark (brother)

Meriwether Lewis Clark Jr. (January 27, 1846 – April 22, 1899) was the founder of the Louisville Jockey Club and the builder of Churchill Downs, where the Kentucky Derby is run.

== Life and career ==
He was the grandson of explorer and Missouri governor, General William Clark of the Lewis and Clark Expedition. His father was Major Meriwether Lewis Clark, "aide de camp" and in-law to General Stephen Watts Kearny, of Mexican–American War fame (Kearny married Mary Radford, the stepdaughter of Clark). His mother was Abigail Prather Churchill, from one of the first families of Kentucky. The Churchills had moved to Louisville in 1787 and bought 300 acres (1.2 km^{2}) of land in a rural area south of the city.

When his mother died, Clark, called "Lutie" by his family, went to live with his aunt and her sons John and Henry Churchill. They had inherited most of the original Churchill property, and they donated the land on which Churchill Downs was built.

Living with the Churchills, Clark developed a taste for expensive things, including horse racing. He made two trips to Europe and married twice, both of his wives dying young.

He came home from abroad in 1873 with ideas about building a racetrack in Louisville. He planned to eliminate bookmaking by introducing the French system of parimutuel betting machines. The Churchill brothers were the entrepreneurs providing the financial backing, and Clark was the acting president and on-site manager.

By all accounts, Clark had a mercurial and touchy personality. He is reported to have threatened prominent breeder T. G. Moore with a gun, ordering him off the premises after having knocked him down in a dispute over fees. Moore got a gun and shot Clark through a door, hitting him in the chest. Moore turned himself in to the police, but no charges were brought against him. Clark later rescinded his ban from the racetrack.

He also threatened others with a gun over perceived insults. The Churchill brothers did not appreciate the negative publicity, and they left the track to their families. Clark received some other land, but by the time John Churchill died in 1897, Clark was merely a steward at the track he had originated.

His contribution to American racing cannot be overstated. In addition to building Churchill Downs and originating the Kentucky Derby, he wrote many racing rules that are still in force today. He worked for a uniform system of weights and pioneered the stakes system, creating the Great American Stallion Stakes, on which the present-day Breeders' Cup is modeled. He also spoke out against betting by officials and reporters.

Clark lost heavily in the stock market crash of 1893 and began traveling from city to city working as a steward. Fearing a life of poverty, he committed suicide with a pistol on April 22, 1899. He is buried in Cave Hill Cemetery next to his uncle, John Churchill.
