= Netarts Bay =

Bay in Oregon

Coordinates: 45.40250°N 123.94444°W

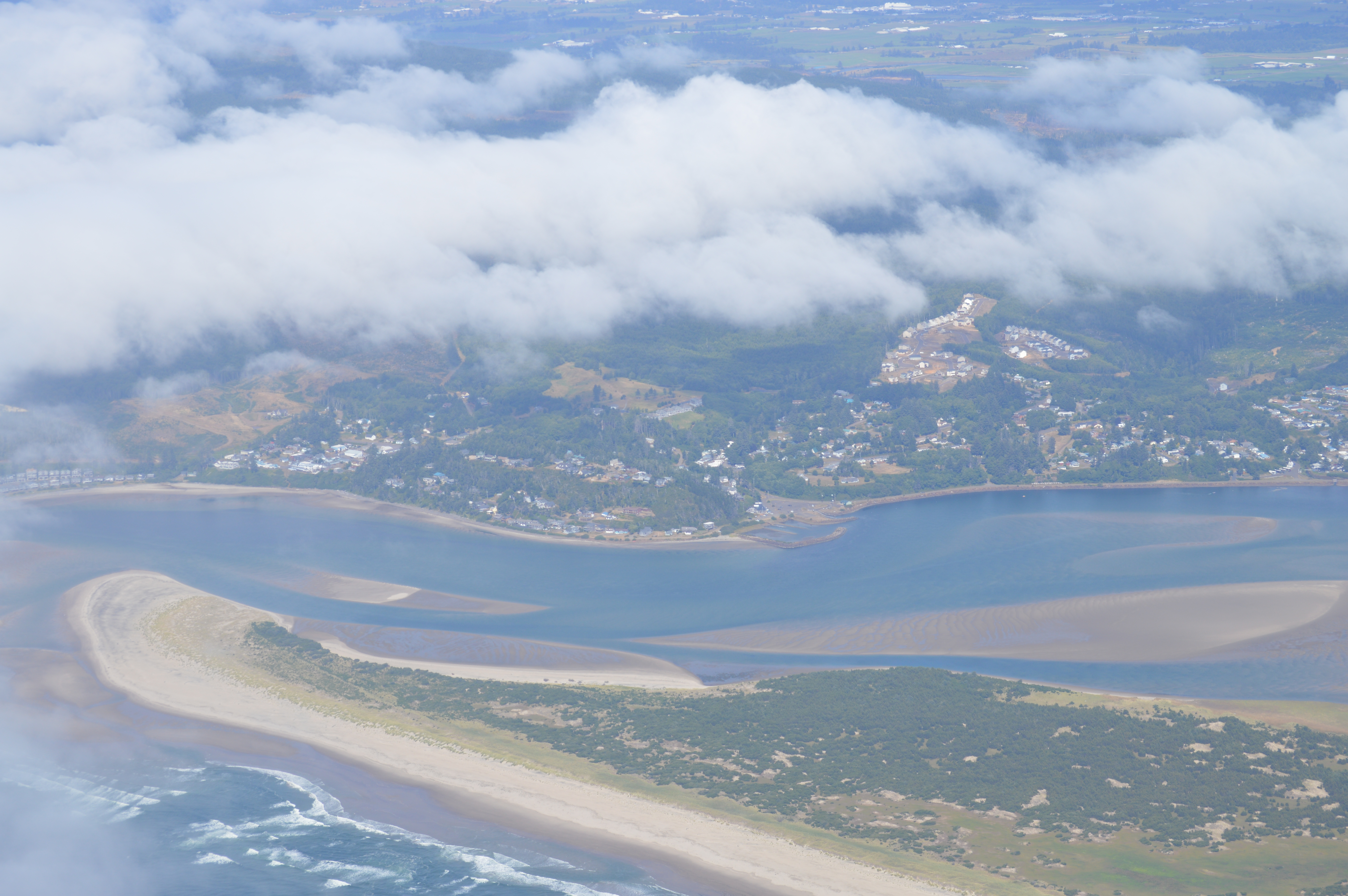
Aerial view of Netarts Bay

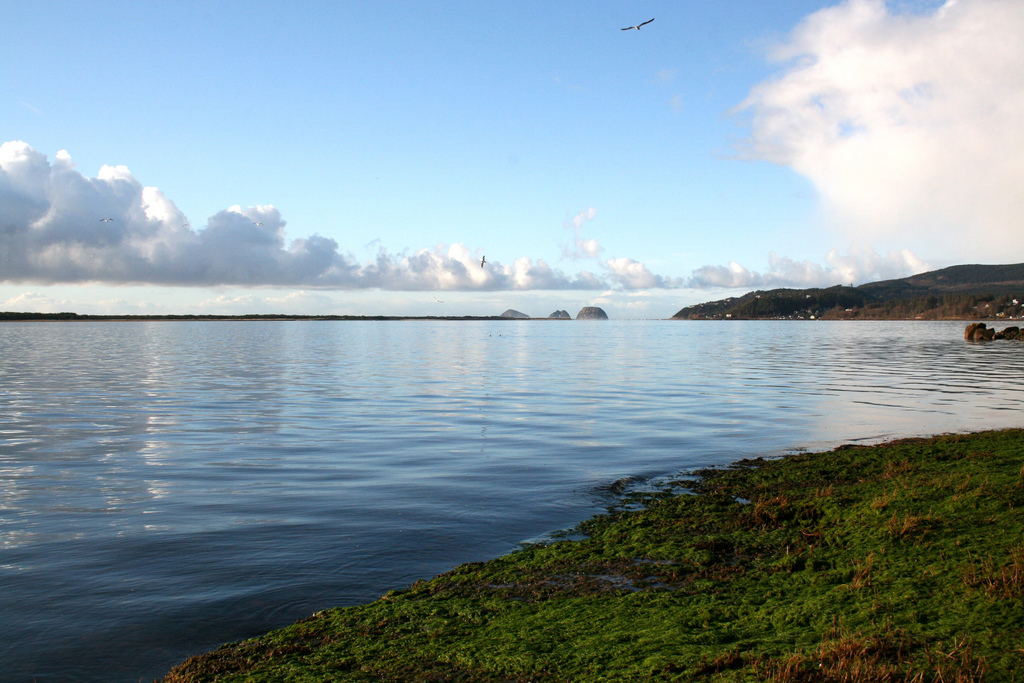
Netarts Bay in February 2009

Netarts Bay is an estuarine bay on the northern Oregon Coast of the U.S. state of Oregon, located about 5 miles (8.0 km) southwest of Tillamook. The unincorporated community of Netarts is located on the north end of the bay and Netarts Bay Shellfish Preserve, managed by Oregon Department of Fish and Wildlife, is located on the south side of the bay. The sand spit on the west side of Netarts bay is part of Cape Lookout State Park.

The bay is approximately 5 by 1.5 miles (8.0 by 2.4 km) and totals 2,325 acres (9.41 km^{2}) in area, making it Oregon's seventh largest bay. Of that, 812 acres (3.29 km^{2}) are permanently submerged—the balance of 1,513 acres (6.12 km^{2}) is intertidal land. It experiences a maximum tidal range of 9 feet (3 m).

The bay is part of a watershed of 13 square miles (34 km^{2}) that is fed by at least 16 small creeks. From north to south, there is Fall Creek, Hodgdon Creek, O'Hara Creek, Rice Creek, two unnamed creeks, Yager Creek, three unnamed creeks, Whiskey Creek, an unnamed creek, Austin Creek, two unnamed creeks, and Jackson Creek.

== Physical characteristics ==
=== Tidal dynamics ===
Like other estuaries along the Oregon Coast, Netarts Bay experiences semi-diurnal tides (two high tides and two low tides per day). At mean low water (the lower low tide), the bay contains approximately 113 million cubic feet of water. Contrasting that with that a mean higher high tide volume of approximately 450 million cubic feet, the bay's tidal prism is about 33 million cubic feet. The tidal range varies between 1.5 and 3 meters(5 – 9 feet), which can vary the amount of water (40–90%) flushed out of the estuary during each tidal cycle. With a mean tidal period of 745 minutes, bay waters turn over, on average, twice a day. Mixing within the estuary is dependent on local winds and tides. Horizontal mixing is limited, although vertical mixing is strong. Little to no vertical variations in temperature and salinity prevent density-driven current velocities, indicating that Netarts Bay is a well-mixed estuary. This has been further corroborated by water quality and dye studies.

http://www.dfw.state.or.us/mrp/shellfish/seacor/findings_netarts_bay.asp

=== Sediment input and erosion ===
Annually, around 2500 tons of sediment are deposited into the bay. An observed 10% decrease in mean high water volume between 1957 and 1969 in conjunction with high sedimentation rates suggests that the bay is gradually filling with sediment over time. LIDAR data has shown the strong erosional response of the Netarts Littoral Cell (a 14-km long stretch of beach tucked between the neighboring Cape Meares and Cape Lookout Headlands) to ENSO (El Niño Southern Oscillation) forcing. During strong El Niño events (e.g. 1997–98), as much as 70,000 cubic meters of sand can be transported. Waves propagating from the southwest erode the southern portion of the spit and transport sediment northward, resulting in northward movement of the bay inlet. This erosion-deposition pattern is amplified by rip currents that create erosional "hot spots" along the spit. Cape Lookout State Park, situated within one of these hotspots, is subject to this intense erosional forcing.

=== Geology ===
Within the last 5 million years, differential erosion patterns on the neighboring Cape Meares and Cape Lookout headlands formed the embayment in which Netarts Bay now sits. Sediment cores obtained from within the bay have provided geological evidence for the existence of large, regularly occurring megathrust earthquakes throughout northwestern Oregon and the larger Cascadia Subduction Zone. Carbon-14 dating of the sediments suggest recurrence rates for these earthquakes to be between 400 and 600 years, and that at least 4 major quakes occurred within the last 3000 years. Sharp sand-layer contacts in the sediment record (deposited by earthquake-generated tsunami waves) indicate post-quake sinking of the marsh. This phenomenon, known as coseismic subsidence, provides strong geological evidence for the regular occurrence of major earthquakes occurring within the Cascadia Subduction Zone. Remnants of fire hearths from Native American settlements along nearby Nehalem and Salmon Rivers provide additional evidence of land subsidence (1–2 meters) resultant from subduction-zone earthquakes.

== Biology ==
=== Shellfish ===
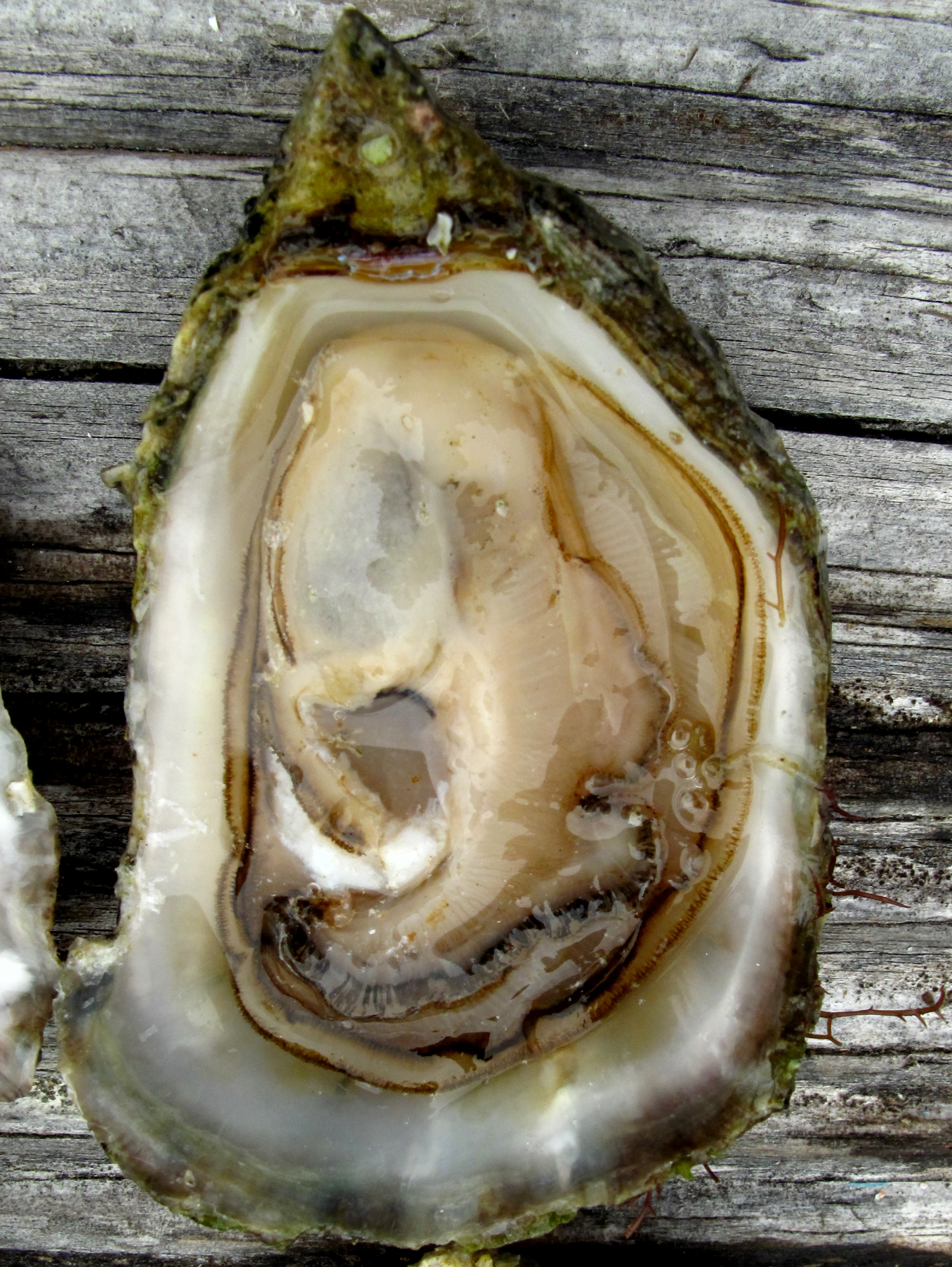
Olympia oyster on the half shell

Olympia oysters are the only native oyster to the West Coast of North America. The establishment of a commercial fishery in the 1860s confirms a historical population within Netarts bay, with evidence of harvesting along the West Coast of North America by humans going back 4000 years. Due to over harvesting, increased consumption, and the export of adult oysters to San Francisco Bay, oyster populations declined in the late 1800s and the commercial fishery collapsed. The last known naturally occurring population of Olympia oysters in Netarts was surveyed in 1954. Subsequent field surveys in 1979 and 1992 did not find any Olympia oysters within the bay. Potential factors preventing population recovery post fishery collapse include: habitat degradation, sedimentation by increased motorized boat use, suffocation by burrowing shrimp, pollution, predation by invasive Japanese oyster drill and parasitism by non-native flat worm After their 1992 survey, Oregon Department of Fish and Wildlife began a large scale restoration attempt in Netarts, setting out 9 million spat between 1993-1998. Olympia oyster populations did not return to historical levels, but surveys in 2004 detected low populations of transplanted oysters in the bay. Anecdotal observations from residents also suggest small pockets of naturally occurring oysters subsist in the southwest corner of the bay. Juvenile oysters planted on adult oyster shell as substrate demonstrated that Olympia oysters can grow and reproduce in the bay. Small scale, investigative restoration projects run by The Nature Conservancy were undertaken in 2005 and 2006 to rebuild populations of Olympia oysters in Netarts Bay by adding shell cultch with set Olympia oysters to the bay in hopes of increasing settlement substrate and broodstock. Early monitoring of these sites found reproductive tissue and brooded larvae in adults and recruitment of larvae on shell substrate, but monitoring of the site ceased in 2007. Restoration interests are driven by culinary interest in Olympia oysters, the potential economic benefits of a commercial fishery, and the significant ecosystem services that Olympia oysters provide, including filtering the water and providing substrate for other organisms.

Four species of bay clam are also found in Netarts Bay.

=== Marine flora ===
The main primary producers of the bay are eelgrass (Zostera marina, a type of seagrass), microscopic diatoms, and sea lettuce (Ulva enteromorpha, a type of macroalgae). Most of these species are found on mudflats, which account for about two-thirds of the total area of Netarts Bay.

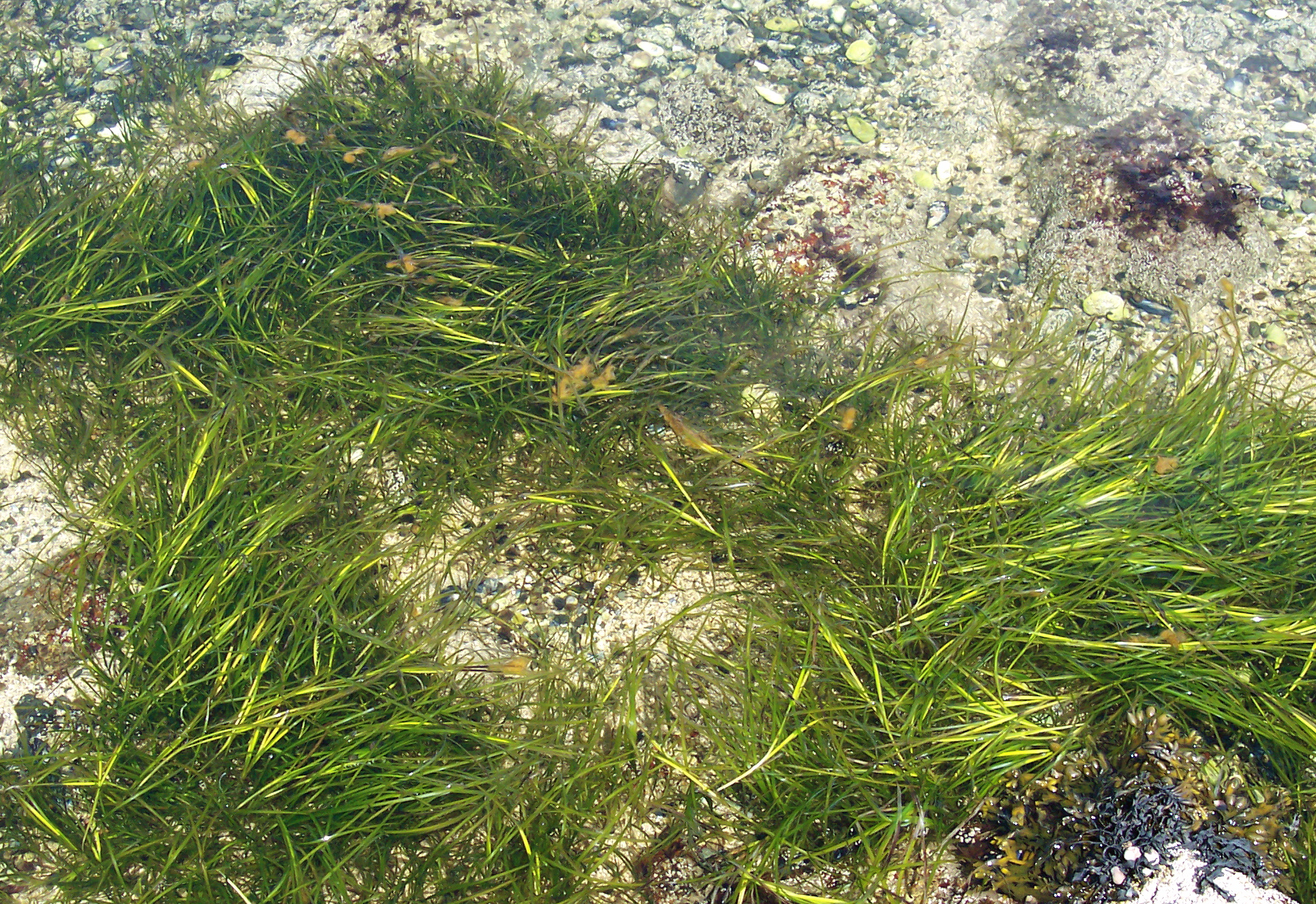
Eelgrass bed (Zostera marina)

Eelgrass beds are found in the intertidal and subtidal mudflats, and biologically interact with oyster beds in a few ways: The pseudofeces and feces of bivalves have been found to fertilize seagrass by increasing bioavailable macronutrients such as ammonium and phosphate in sediments. Bivalves also filter phytoplankton from the water column, a process which reduces water turbidity, allows more light to penetrate through the water column, and reduces the number of epiphytes living on seagrass leaves. Eelgrass is important as food for waterfowl, habitat for juvenile fish, and as physical shapers of the bay. The growing season is from April to October.

Diatoms are found in benthic and pelagic environments of the bay, and also as epiphytes living on other marine plants. There is a total of 336 diatom taxa identified in the bay, 50 of which are planktonic, 123 of which are epiphytic, and 282 of which are benthic (about 111 taxa overlap the epiphytic and benthic categories). Benthic diatom assemblage distributions correspond to sediment type, grain size, and wave energy.

Sea lettuce, a macroalgae otherwise known as green nori, grows usually only in the summer. Seasonal upwelling along the Pacific North American coast has been correlated to increased sea lettuce productivity and decreased eelgrass productivity.

Japanese eelgrass (Zostera japonica) is an introduced species found in bays and estuaries ranging from Oregon to British Columbia, Canada. It was likely brought over by Pacific oyster seed shipments that began in the early 20th century used by commercial shellfisheries along the Pacific northwest coast.

== Native Americans and Netarts Bay ==
Netarts Bay and sand spit are within the historic territory of the Tillamook Indians, which ranged from Tillamook head in the north to the Nestucca River in the south and from the Pacific Ocean in the west to the Coast Range summit in the east. Cape Lookout State Park contains 13 suspected archaeological sites, including 6 on Netarts sand spit representing at least one and perhaps up to three major villages. Archaeological excavations of Netarts Sandspit Village (35-TI-1) show evidence of a major Tillamook village that was occupied at least three separate times between 1300–1700 A.D. Excavations revealed semisubterranean cedar plank structures with single pitched roofs, numerous hearths and fire pits, and middens around all house pits. The village contained at least 13 house pits and may have contained up to 30–40 house pits. It has been described as "the most impressive house pit site on State Park lands along the Oregon Coast."

Numerous artifacts were found during excavation of 35-Ti-1 in the 1950s. Some of the bone and antler objects found include: wedges, adzes, awls, needles, bi-pointed pins, blades, harpoon barbs, chisels, digging stick handles, and bone carvings with faces, perhaps from clubs or wand handles. One house pit included whalebone objects including a 1.5m x 0.3m (~5 ft x 1 ft) seat and a possible whale vertebrae seat surrounded by fire pits. Numerous stone artifacts were also found at the site, including: projectile points, blades, scrapers, gravers, core choppers, modified flakes, double pitted cobbles, hammerstones, and whetstones. The most recent occupation layer also contained trade goods including: rusted iron (perhaps knife blades), a copper pendant, and many sherds of Chinese porcelain.

Closer examination of the middens surrounding major house pits identified middens that were up to 1.3m deep, and in some cases over 2m deep. Over 67,000 vertebrate specimens, in total, of at least 59 species have been recovered from test pits at the site including bones from birds, fish, shellfish, sea lions, sea otters, seals, porpoises, whales, elk, deer, and beavers. Initial attempts to describe midden composition determined a rough 50:50 split between shells of blue clams and cockles, with butter clams and bent-nosed clams making up the rest. However, future investigations found over 14,000 Dungeness crab fragments in roughly 4m^{3} of excavated midden sediment. It was determined that Native Americans harvested a large size range of Dungeness crabs, including many juvenile crabs, from the bay. It is suspected crabs were collected along with cockles using a rake-like tool during low tide. It seems all major shellfish species found in the middens could be harvested throughout the course of a tidal cycle.

== Early European settlement ==
It is suspected that contact between Europeans and Indians became more numerous and consistent in the late 1700s. By the time Lewis & Clark arrived in 1806, Indians had firearms and metal implements. The first European settlers arrived in Netarts Bay in 1865, and records suggest native Olympia oysters were abundant in the bay. In fact, there are indications oyster harvests by European settlers began as early as 1868 and that at least some of these oysters were exported to San Francisco. Historic accounts indicate a shanty town, named Oysterville, was present in the bay during this time, and the bay was sometimes called "Oyster Bay." By 1903 virtually all shore line of the spit was claimed and occupied. Despite early claims, residential use of Netarts sand spit had mostly disappeared by 1920 and subsequent growth concentrated in Netarts along the northeast bay. A commercial oyster cultivating industry was present from 1930-1957; however, the accidental introduction of the Japanese oyster drill led to the collapse of this industry in 1957.

== Ocean acidification ==
The oyster industry along the West Coast of North America relies almost exclusively on the Pacific Oyster, Crassostrea gigas. There are only three locations on the West Coast of North America where natural recruitment of C. gigas takes place: Willapa Bay, WA, Hood Canal WA, and British Columbia, Canada. Recruitment elsewhere is limited by cold water temperatures that inhibit spawning and low residence time of water that flushes out larvae, making the oyster industry dependent on hatcheries to raise larvae. Whiskey Creek Shellfish Hatchery, located in Netarts Bay, is one of the largest providers of larvae for the industry. In the late summer of 2007, the hatchery saw massive die offs in larvae, resulting in zero production for multiple months on end. Similar die offs and production failures occurred at other Pacific Northwest hatcheries and oyster farms. Water samples from Whiskey Creek Shellfish Hatchery tested positive for a bacterium, Vibrio tubiashii, and this pathogen was suspected to be the cause of the mortality. However, after installing a new system to clean the water, another round of die-offs occurred.

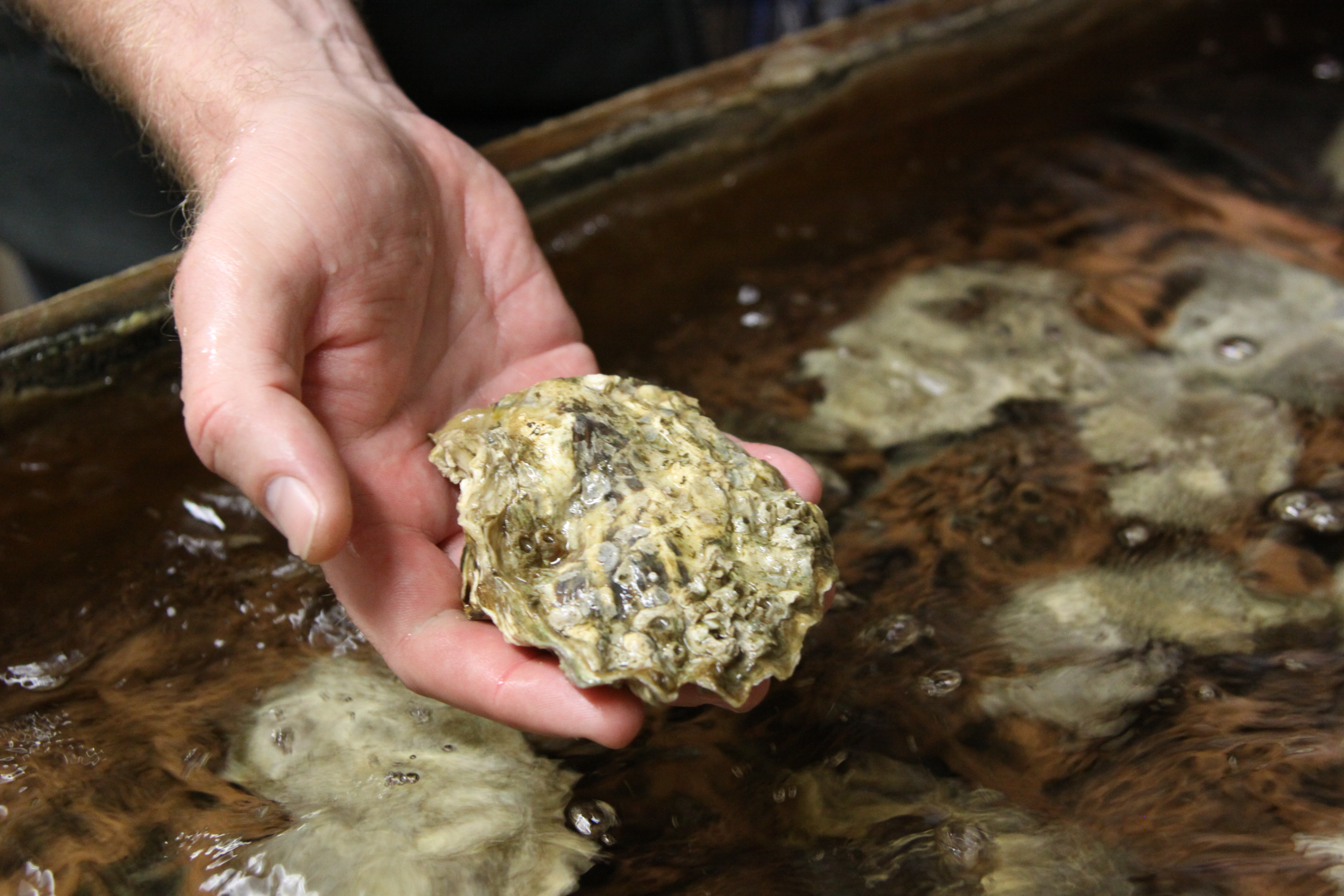
Oyster at Whiskey Creek Shellfish Hatchery. Photo by Oregon State University.

Researchers from Oregon State University and Hatchery employees were able to work together to make the connection between early larval mortality and upwelling conditions that negatively impacted the entire west coast shellfish industry. Using Hatchery records of larval performance and monitoring of incoming tidal water from Netarts Bay, low aragonite saturation states at the time of spawning were correlated with the high levels of larval mortality that heavily reduced hatchery production and negatively impacted the west coast oyster industry Further research from OSU, supported by Whiskey Creek, helped to identify the first 48 hours of larval life, in which the initial shell is built, as a window of vulnerability to ocean acidification due to the rapid rate of calcification and limited energetic budget. Experiments decoupling PCO_{2}, pH demonstrated that aragonite saturation has the greatest impact on shell development of early bivalve larvae. These conclusions supported buffering of incoming water and chemical monitoring approach used by Whiskey Creek Hatchery to improve survival of larval oysters. Research at Whiskey Creek Hatchery contributed to the body of knowledge around ocean acidification and the immediate impacts it has on calcifying organisms.

=== Water quality monitoring systems ===
Real-time water quality monitoring systems now exist to help shellfish farmers, scientists, and others invested in oyster aquaculture track changes in aragonite saturation state, pCO_{2} and pH. An online portal with this information was funded by the U.S. Integrated Ocean Observing System (IOOS), and regional ocean observing systems continuously contribute to the data stream. One such regional system, the Northwest Association of Networked Ocean Observing Systems (NANOOS), aims to develop predictive data products for use by local and national stakeholders in shellfish aquaculture, as well as the general public. Water quality data are provided by analytical gas monitoring systems known as "burkolators," named for the OSU researcher who invented them, Dr. Burke Hales. Burkolators resolve PCO_{2} and TCO_{2} (total dissolved carbon dioxide) measurements within water samples at high spatial resolution, allowing for accurate calculations of total alkalinity. Initially implemented as a scientific tool, burkolators are now used at 5 shellfish hatcheries along the U.S. West Coast to monitor incoming water quality. Live feeds of burkolator data at the hatcheries can be found on the NANOOS website.

=== Impact on shellfish industry ===
Most shellfish growers have observed effects of ocean acidification on their businesses. In a survey of 86 shellfish growers located in California, Oregon, and Washington, 85% identified ocean acidification as a problem affecting them today, and 95% identified ocean acidification as a problem that will affect future generations. Bivalve larvae are generally more susceptible than adult bivalves to decreased pH and saturation states, so early stages of oyster seeding may be more vulnerable the bioenergetic stress of ocean acidification. Spatial and temporal variations in ocean chemistry require continual adaptation, and shellfish growers are subject to greater uncertainty in the face of climate change.
