= Meriwether Lewis Clark Sr. =

American architect and engineer

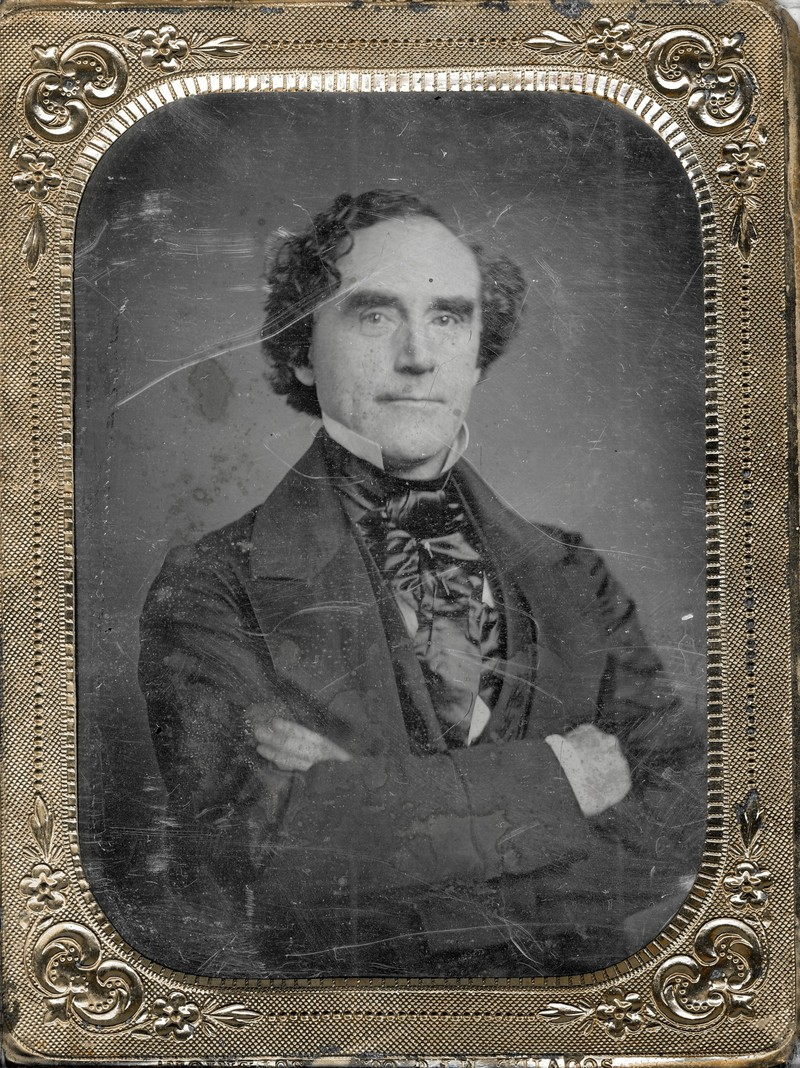

Member of the Missouri House of Representatives
- In office 1836–1846

Personal details
- Born: January 10, 1809 St. Louis, Missouri, U.S.
- Died: October 28, 1881 (aged 72) Frankfort, Kentucky, U.S.
- Resting place: Bellefontaine Cemetery
- Spouse(s): Abigail Prather Churchill (m. 1834; died 1852) Julia Davidson (m. 1865)
- Children: 7
- Parent: William Clark (father)
- Education: United States Military Academy
- Occupation: Architect, civil engineer, politician, and military officer

Military service
- Allegiance: United States; Missouri; Confederate States
- Branch/service: United States Army (US); Missouri State Guard (MSG); Confederate States Army (CSA)
- Years of service: 1830–1833, 1846-1847 (USA); 1861 (MSG); 1861–1865 (CSA)
- Rank: Major (US); Brigadier General (MSG); Colonel (CSA)
- Unit: 6th U.S. Infantry
- Battles/wars: Black Hawk War; Mexican-American War; Battle of the Sacramento River; American Civil War; Appomattox Campaign; Battle of Sayler's Creek

Meriwether Lewis Clark (January 10, 1809 – October 28, 1881) was an architect, civil engineer, and politician. He was also a military officer in the Mexican–American War and the American Civil War. He was a son of famous explorer William Clark.

== Early life and career ==
Clark was born in St. Louis, Missouri, the son of Missouri and Corps of Discovery expedition leader, William Clark of Lewis and Clark fame. He was named after his father's friend and associate, Meriwether Lewis. In 1826, he was admitted to the United States Military Academy and graduated 23rd of 42 cadets in the Class of 1830. He was brevetted as a second lieutenant in the 6th U.S. Infantry and assigned to Jefferson Barracks in St. Louis. He was an officer and mapmaker in the Black Hawk War before resigning from the army in 1833.

While on assignment in Louisville, Kentucky, Clark met and courted Abigail Prather Churchill, of the prominent Churchill family (Her younger brother was Arkansas Governor Thomas James Churchill). They married in January 1834 and raised seven children before her death in 1852. Their son Meriwether Lewis Clark Jr. would become a prominent member of Louisville society, promoting horseracing and building, with help from his Churchill relations, the famous racetrack Churchill Downs.

As a designer-architect, Clark contributed to the early architecture of St. Louis, including the design of St. Vincent de Paul Roman Catholic Church. In 1836, he was elected to the Missouri General Assembly. Four years later, he was named as the city engineer of St. Louis and later was the recorder of the city court.

During the Mexican War in 1846, Clark resumed his military career as a major in the Missouri volunteers, serving as the commander of an artillery battalion with 3 companies of light artillery. He participated in the Battle of the Sacramento River near Chihuahua City under overall command of Colonel Alexander Doniphan on February 28, 1847.

After the Mexican-American War, Clark returned to St. Louis and was the Federal surveyor-general for Missouri and Illinois until 1853.

== Civil War service ==
In early 1861, Clark, strongly pro-secessionist in his political views, was appointed by Governor Claiborne F. Jackson to organize recruits from the Ninth District of Missouri. He received an appointment as a Brigadier General of the Ninth Division of the Missouri State Guard, but the unit was never formally organized during his tenure, partially because of the very strong pro-Union sentiment in St. Louis. Clark resigned from the Guard in November 1861 and was replaced by Daniel M. Frost.

He then accepted a commission as a major of artillery in the Confederate States Army. He was promoted to colonel and assigned to various staff positions; including as Chief of Artillery of the Army of Mississippi under General Braxton Bragg. Disagreement with the latter led to his dismissal from the position. He then served in the Ordnance Department in Richmond, Virginia, until November 1864 when he assumed command of a brigade of Virginia Reserve Forces in the Army of Northern Virginia under Robert E. Lee. During the Appomattox Campaign, he was taken prisoner at the Battle of Sayler's Creek near Amelia Courthouse, Virginia, on April 6, 1865.

== Postbellum career ==
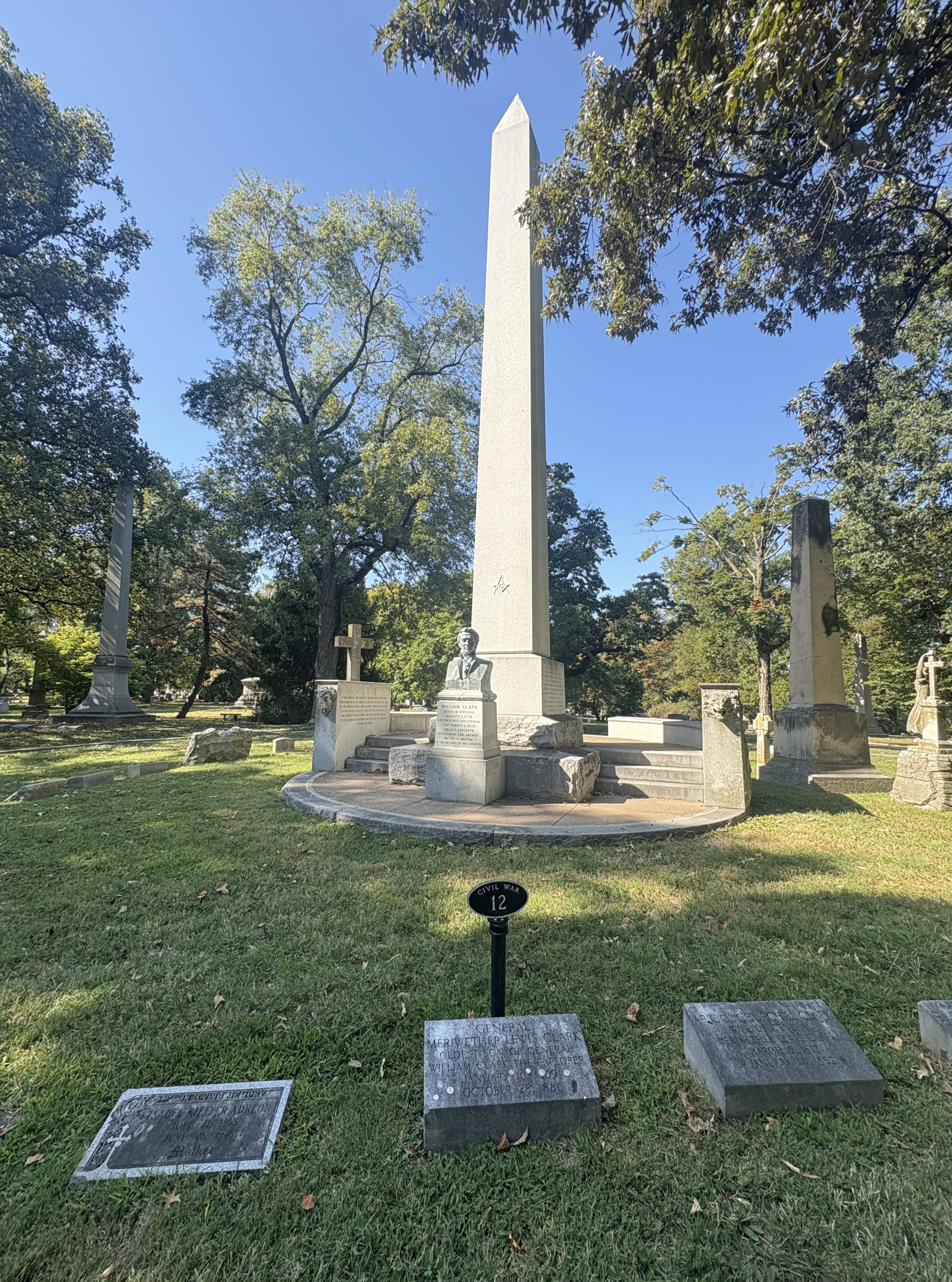
Clark's grave (front center) at Bellefontaine Cemetery

After the war, Clark moved to Louisville, Kentucky, and resumed his engineering career. He married Jula Davidson on December 30, 1865. He was the lead architect on the design and construction of several state buildings in Kentucky. He later was the commander of cadets at the Kentucky Military Institute.

Clark died in Frankfort, Kentucky, in 1881, and was buried at Bellefontaine Cemetery in St. Louis.

== See also ==
- List of American Civil War generals (Acting Confederate)
