= Fairview, Tillamook County, Oregon =

Unincorporated community in the state of Oregon, United States

Fairview
- Unincorporated community and Census designated place
- Location within Oregon Location within the United States
- Coordinates: 45°27′30″N 123°47′33″W
- Country: United States
- State: Oregon
- County: Tillamook
- Elevation: 69 ft (21 m)
- Time zone: UTC-8 (Pacific (PST))
  - Summer (DST): UTC-7 (PDT)
- Area code: 503
- GNIS feature ID: 2812896

Fairview is an unincorporated community in Tillamook County, Oregon, United States. It lies about 2 miles (3 km) east of Tillamook and slightly south of Oregon Route 6, the Wilson River highway.

== Fairview Grange ==
=== History ===
Fairview Grange - located by the Tillamook County Fairgrounds on 3rd street - was founded in 1895 as the 273rd Grange organized in the nation, and the first Tillamook County. The hall itself was constructed in 1916, costing $2,000 USD at the time ($59174 USD today, when adjusted for inflation).

=== Restoration ===
The Grange hall gradually fell into a state of disrepair and was to be demolished in 2014 before members of Oregon's State Government intervened. Following this, renovations began late in 2021 and are set to continue until the summer of 2022.

== Education ==
It is in the Tillamook School District 9.

The county is in the Tillamook Bay Community College district.
