= KTIL =

KTIL may refer to:

- KTIL (AM), a radio station (1590 AM) licensed to serve Netarts, Oregon, United States
- KTIL-FM, a radio station (95.9 FM) licensed to serve Bay City, Oregon
