= Tillamook High School =

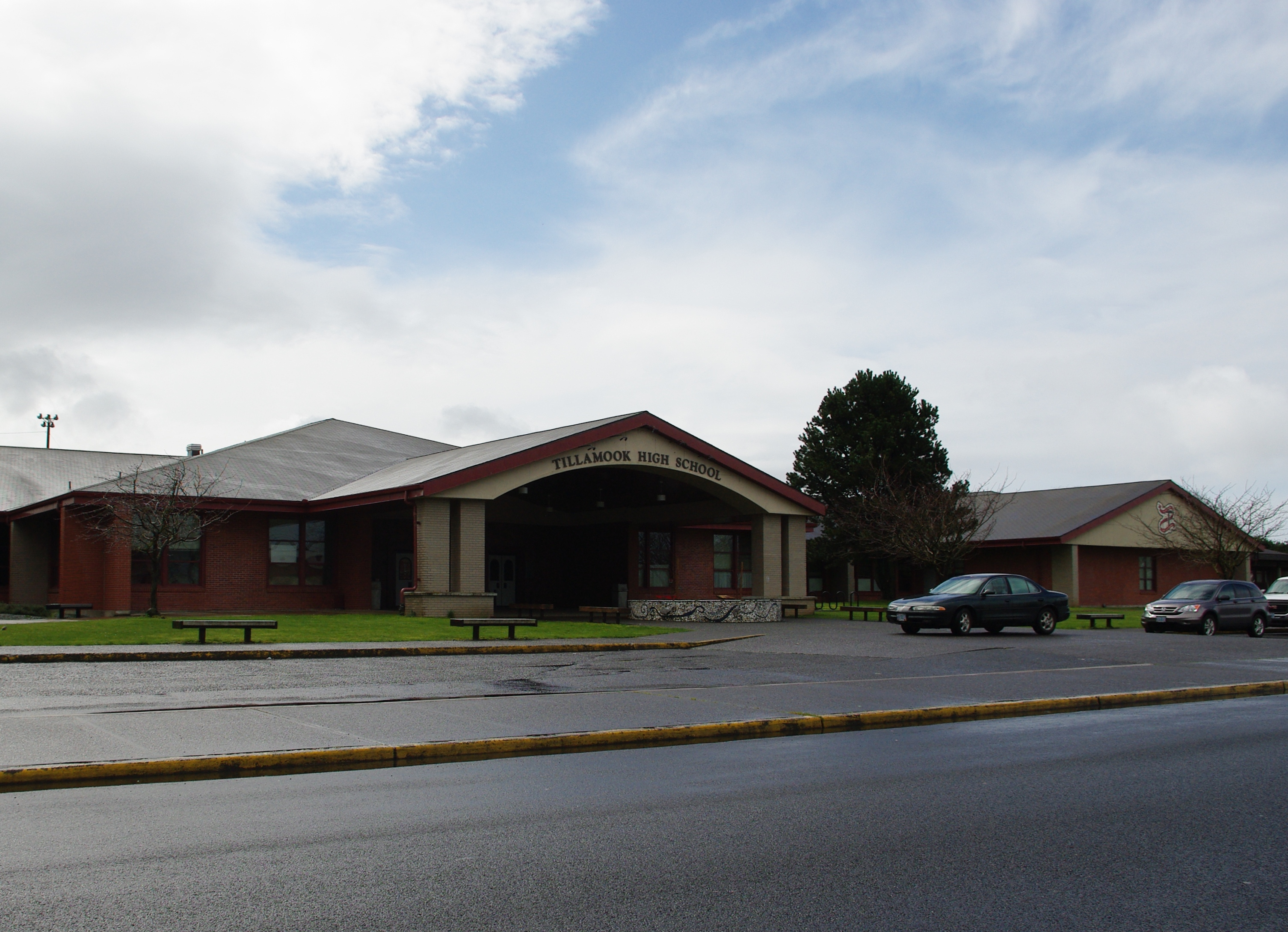

Location
- 2605 12th Street; Tillamook, Tillamook, Oregon 97141; United States
- Coordinates: 45.449011°N 123.836131°W

Information
- Type: Public
- Established: Prior to 1912
- School district: Tillamook School District
- Principal: Jill Ingram
- Teaching staff: 46.80 (FTE)
- Grades: 9–12
- Enrollment: 763 (2023–2024)
- Student to teacher ratio: 16.30
- Colors: Red, Black, and White
- Athletics conference: OSAA Cowapa League 4A-1
- Team name: Tillamook Cheesemakers
- Website: tillamookhigh.com

Tillamook High School is a four-year public high school located in Tillamook, Oregon, United States, as part of the Tillamook School District. The school has served the area for over 100 years. Its mascot is the Cheesemaker and its colors are red, black, and white.

== History ==
Tillamook High School was established sometime prior to 1912. The 1915 yearbook indicates alumni as far back as 1904. A new high school had been built for students in 1912. Students attended this school until the 1951–1952 school year, when they moved to the current location.

== Academics ==
In 2008, 77% of the school's seniors received their high school diploma. Of 173 students, 133 graduated, 17 dropped out, 4 received a modified diploma, and 19 were still in high school the next year.

Tillamook High School offers one Advanced Placement (AP) course and two opportunities for college credit through Tillamook Bay Community College

== Athletics ==
The school's teams are known as the "Cheesemakers" after the local Tillamook Cheese Factory.

In 2007, Tillamook High School received a new turf football/soccer/track field.

== Notable alumni ==
- Monica Bannister, actress
- Brian Boquist, politician
- Jerry Kilgore, musician
- Lars Larson, radio personality
- Jacob Young, actor, All My Children
