= TMK (disambiguation) =

TMK may refer to:

- OAO TMK, a Russian pipe producer
- TMK, Soviet Union Mars bound space exploration project
- Tillamook Airport, Oregon, USA, FAA identifier
- Torchmark Corporation, NYSE symbol
- Touch My Katamari, a PlayStation Vita game
- Tees Maar Khan (disambiguation), title of several Indian films
- Türk Maarif Koleji, school in Northern Cyprus
- TM Krishna, Indian singer
- Tai'an railway station (Shandong), China Railway telegraph code TMK
