= Pleasant Valley, Tillamook County, Oregon =

Community in United States

Coordinates: 45°22′34″N 123°47′43″W

Pleasant Valley is an unincorporated community in Tillamook County, Oregon, United States. It is located about seven miles south of Tillamook, on U.S. Route 101.

The community was probably named for the pleasant surroundings. As of 1993, there was little in the community but a country store.

== Education ==
It is in the Tillamook School District 9.

The county is in the Tillamook Bay Community College district.
