= Tillamook Airport =

Airport in Oregon, United States

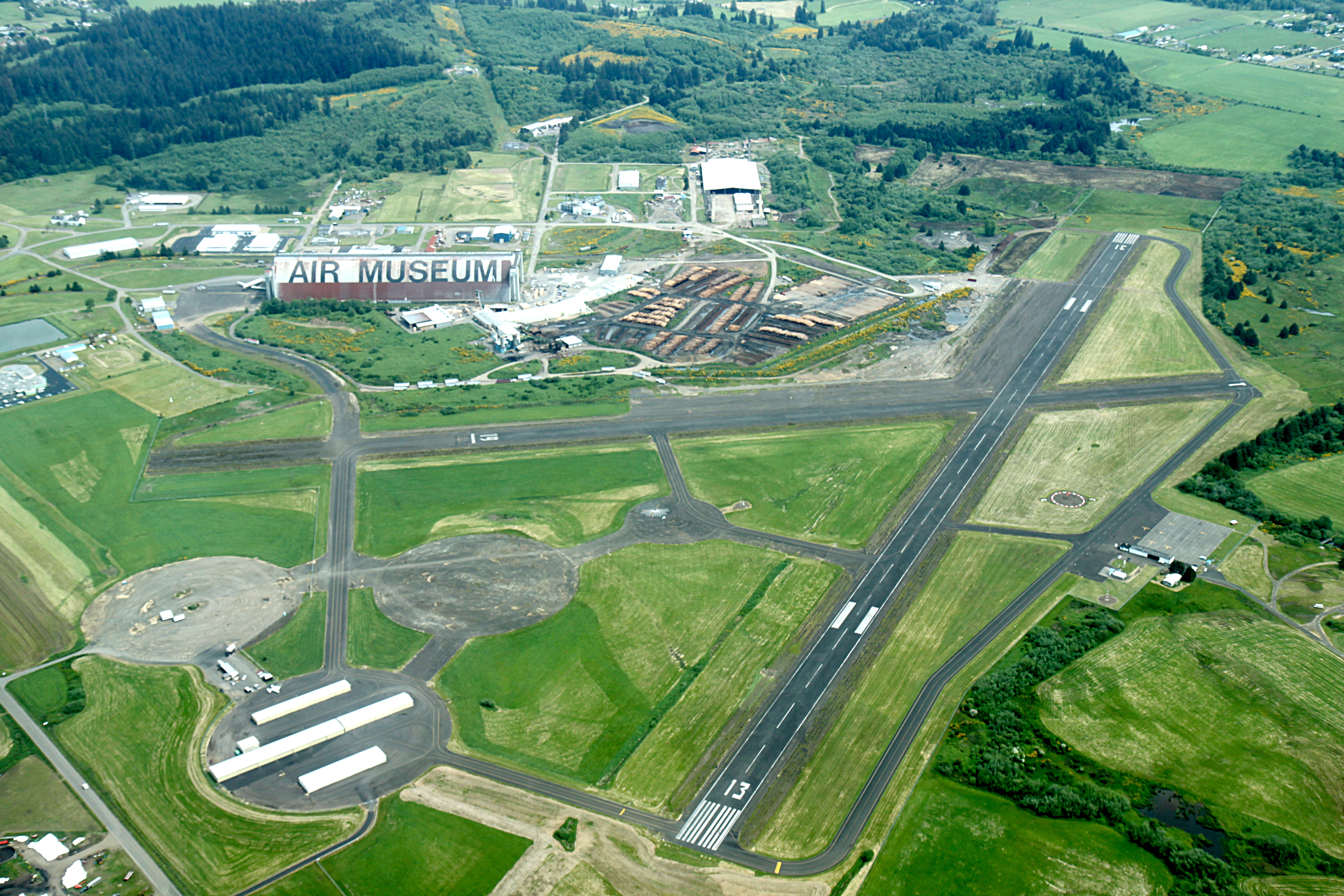
- IATA: OTK; ICAO: KTMK; FAA LID: TMK

Summary
- Airport type: Public
- Owner: Port of Tillamook Bay
- Serves: Tillamook, Oregon
- Elevation AMSL: 36 ft / 11 m
- Coordinates: 45°25′06″N 123°48′52″W
- Website: www.potb.org/...
- Interactive map of Tillamook Airport

Runways
| Direction | Length | | Surface |
| Direction | ft | m | Surface |
|---|---|---|---|
| 13/31 | 5,001 | 1,524 | Asphalt |
| 1/19 | 2,911 | 887 | Asphalt |

Statistics (2017)
- Aircraft operations (year ending 9/26/2017): 25,600
- Based aircraft: 18
- Source: Federal Aviation Administration

Tillamook Airport (IATA: OTK, ICAO: KTMK, FAA LID: TMK) is a public use airport located 3 miles (4.8 km) south of the central business district of Tillamook, a city in Tillamook County, Oregon, United States. It is owned by the Port of Tillamook Bay. According to the FAA's National Plan of Integrated Airport Systems for 2009–2013, it is categorized as a general aviation facility.

The airfield was developed from the former Naval Air Station Tillamook and serves as the home to the Tillamook Air Museum.

Although many U.S. airports use the same three-letter location identifier for the FAA and IATA, this facility is assigned TMK by the FAA and OTK by the IATA (which assigned TMK to Tam-Ky, Vietnam).

== Facilities and aircraft ==
Tillamook Airport covers an area of 360 acres (150 ha) at an elevation of 36 feet (11 m) above mean sea level. It has two asphalt paved runways: 13/31 is 5,001 by 100 feet (1,524 x 30 m) and 1/19 is 2,911 by 75 feet (887 x 23 m).

For the 12-month period ending September 26, 2017, the airport had 25,600 aircraft operations, an average of 70 per day: 99% general aviation and <1% military. At that time there were 18 aircraft based at this airport: all single-engine.
