= Cape Meares, Oregon =

Unincorporated community in the state of Oregon, United States

- Census-designated place (CDP)
- Location of Cape Meares, Oregon
- Coordinates: 45°30′23″N 123°57′31″W
- Country: United States
- State: Oregon
- County: Tillamook

Area
  - Total: 3.69 sq mi (9.55 km^{2})
  - Land: 3.44 sq mi (8.91 km^{2})
  - Water: 0.25 sq mi (0.64 km^{2})
- Elevation: 30 ft (9.1 m)

Population (2020)
  - Total: 135
  - Density: 39.2/sq mi (15.15/km^{2})
- Time zone: UTC-8 (Pacific (PST))
  - Summer (DST): UTC-7 (PDT)
- ZIP code: 97141
- Area code: 503
- FIPS code: 41-11050
- GNIS feature ID: 2407960

Cape Meares is a census-designated place (CDP) and unincorporated community in Tillamook County, Oregon, United States. As of the 2020 census, Cape Meares had a population of 135.

The community is named after the natural feature of the same name, which in turn was named after John Meares, a British explorer. The Bayocean post office was briefly renamed "Cape Meares" in 1953 but closed the next year.

== Geography ==
According to the United States Census Bureau, the CDP has a total area of 3.1 square miles (8.0 km^{2}), of which, 2.8 square miles (7.3 km^{2}) of it is land and 0.3 square miles (0.78 km^{2}) of it (8.39%) is water. The area is located 246 feet (75 m) above sea-level.

== Demographics ==
Historical population
Census	Pop.	Note	%±
2020	135		—
U.S. Decennial Census

As of the census of 2000, there were 110 people, 63 households, and 34 families residing in the CDP. The population density was 38.8 people per square mile (15.0 people/km^{2}). There were 156 housing units at an average density of 55.0 per square mile (21.2/km^{2}). The racial makeup of the CDP was 89.09% White, 3.64% Native American, 0.91% from other races, and 6.36% from two or more races. Hispanic or Latino of any race were 1.82% of the population.

There were 63 households, out of which 9.5% had children under the age of 18 living with them, 46.0% were married couples living together, 6.3% had a female householder with no husband present, and 46.0% were non-families. 39.7% of all households were made up of individuals, and 17.5% had someone living alone who was 65 years of age or older. The average household size was 1.75 and the average family size was 2.26.

In the CDP, the population was spread out, with 10.0% under the age of 18, 2.7% from 18 to 24, 9.1% from 25 to 44, 48.2% from 45 to 64, and 30.0% who were 65 years of age or older. The median age was 57 years. For every 100 females, there were 100.0 males. For every 100 females age 18 and over, there were 98.0 males.

The median income for a household in the CDP was $26,346, and the median income for a family was $31,250. Males had a median income of $0 versus $61,250 for females. The per capita income for the CDP was $26,635. There were 31.3% of families and 30.6% of the population living below the poverty line, including no under eighteens and none of those over 64.

== Education ==
It is in the Tillamook School District 9.

The county is in the Tillamook Bay Community College district.
