= Idaville =

Idaville may refer to:

- Idaville, Pennsylvania, a town in Pennsylvania
- Idaville, Indiana, a town in Indiana
- Idaville, Oregon, an unincorporated community in Oregon
- The fictional hometown of Encyclopedia Brown
