= KMBD =

KMBD may refer to:

- KMBD-LD, a low-power television station (channel 20, virtual 43) licensed to serve Minneapolis, Minnesota, United States
- KTIL (AM), a radio station (1590 AM) licensed to serve Netarts, Oregon, United States, which held the call sign KMBD from 1993 to 2010
