= CA65 =

CA65 or CA-65 may refer to:

- California State Route 65, a state highway in the US state of California
- Cvjetkovic CA-65, a monoplane aircraft
- Atsuta Station, a railway station in Atsuta-ku, Nagoya, Japan (station code: CA65)
- ca65, a companion assembler for the cc65 freeware C programming language compiler
