= Walter T. West =

American politician

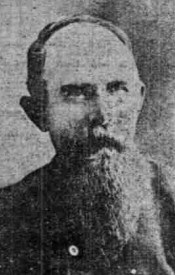

Member of the Oregon House of Representatives from the 14^{th} District
- In office 1905–1907
- Preceded by: Benjamin L. Eddy
- Succeeded by: A. G. Beals

Personal details
- Born: May 24, 1845 Wisconsin
- Died: Unknown
- Party: Republican
- Occupation: farmer

Walter T. West was an American politician and farmer. He served for one term in the Oregon House of Representatives from 1905 to 1907, representing the 14^{th} District. He was a member of the Republican Party.

== Biography ==
Walter T. West was born on May 24, 1845, in Wisconsin to his parents D. V. T. and Mary West. Following his education, West became employed as a bridge builder in Jackson County, Wisconsin, and later under the employ of the Illinois Central Railroad. In 1869, West married Mary Farmer who was from Union County, Illinois. The two moved to a farm in Dakota County, Minnesota, before finally settling in Norman County, Minnesota, in 1874 Two years later the West family moved to Stearns County, Minnesota. After eight years of farming in Minnesota, West and his family moved to Tillamook County, Oregon, where Mary West's (née Farmer) father had settled. The West family arrived in Tillamook on May 20, 1884, and purchased their farm on October 4, 1884. West's farm had several dairy cows.

West was nominated by the Republican Party as Justice of the Peace for the third district in 1902. West also served as the director of the Tillamook School District for a total of 13 years. At the state Republican Party convention in 1904, West was nominated as their candidate for the 14^{th} District of the Oregon House of Representatives, which encompassed Tillamook and Yamhill counties. His opponent was C. W. Talmage who was nominated by the Democratic Party. During the June general election, West defeated Talmage. West only served one term in the legislature and was succeeded by A. G. Beals.

In 1906, West moved his family to Newberg, Oregon. They briefly lived in tents while they constructed their home. Coates. a farmer by trade, was appointed to the Newberg Apple Growers Association in 1910. In 1915, he was appointed to the board of directors to the Newberg Co-operative Growers Association. The same year, West was appointed to the board of director of the Newberg Cannery. West's farm was known as West & Son, which specialized in prunes and dried berries. By 1921, his farm had 800 plum trees.

It is unclear what West's exact date of death was, but estate proceedings on his property began in 1932.
