= Idaville, Oregon =

Unincorporated community in the state of Oregon, United States

- Unincorporated community & census-designated place (CDP)
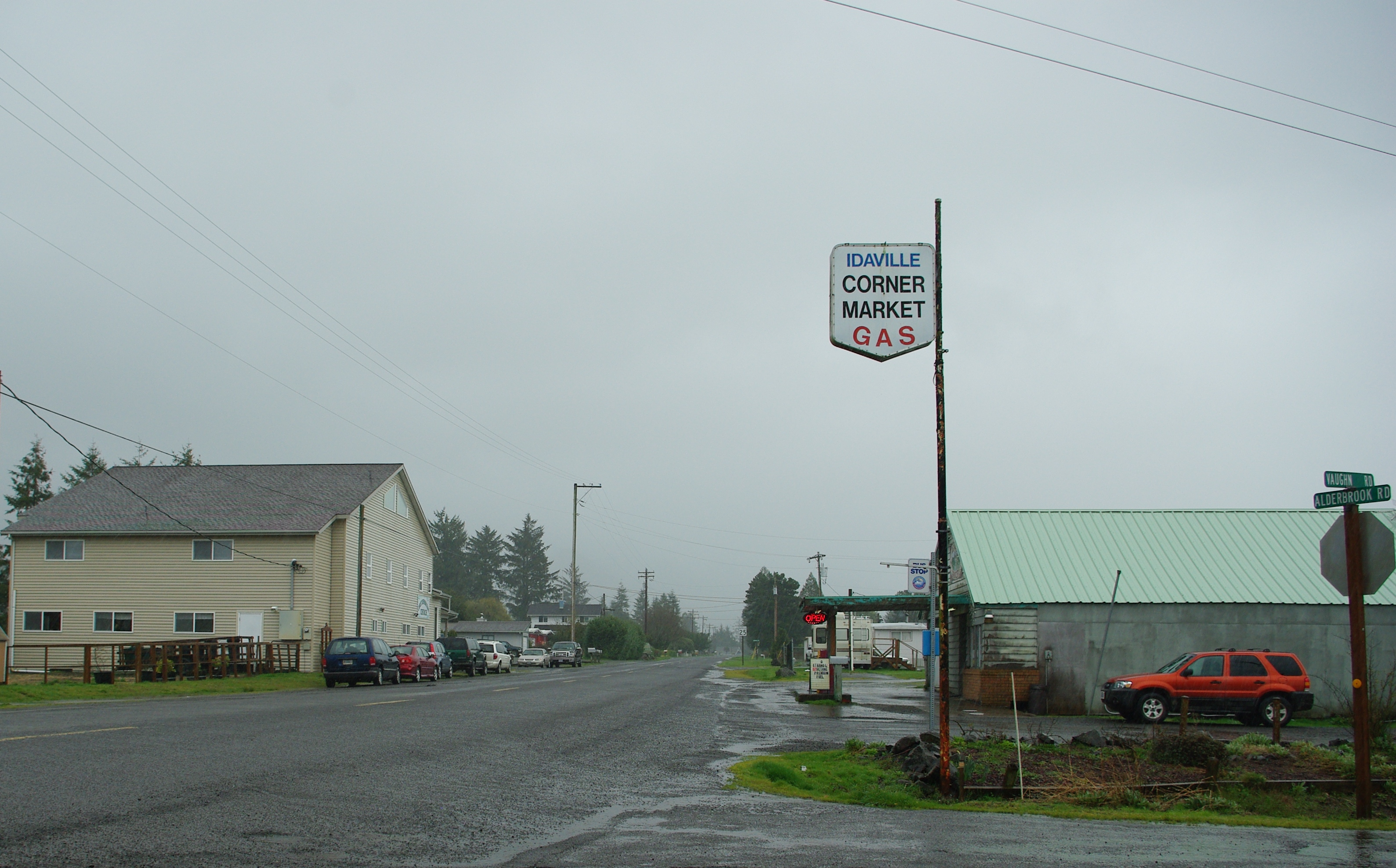
- Store and the main road

- Location within Oregon Location within the United States
- Coordinates: 45°30′35″N 123°51′48″W
- Country: United States
- State: Oregon
- County: Tillamook
- Elevation: 46 ft (14 m)
- Time zone: UTC-8 (Pacific (PST))
  - Summer (DST): UTC-7 (PDT)
- ZIP code: 97141
- Area codes: 503 and 971
- GNIS feature ID: 2611735

Idaville is a census-designated place and unincorporated community in Tillamook County, Oregon, United States. As of the 2020 census, Idaville had a population of 374.

It was founded around the year 1870 by Warren N. Vaughn and named for his daughter Ida. The post office was established in 1922 and closed five years later, in 1927.

== Education ==
It is in the Tillamook School District 9.

The county is in the Tillamook Bay Community College district.
