= Tillamook School District =

School district in Oregon, United States

The Tillamook School District (9) serves Tillamook, Oregon, United States, and its surrounding areas. As of 2019, the district had 2,105 students. Tillamook School District serves approximately 2,105 students at a total of six schools. Those schools are: Liberty Elementary School (K-1), South Prairie Elementary (2nd-3rd), East Elementary (4th-6th), one junior high school, one high school (Tillamook High School), and two alternative high schools, Wilson River School and (contracted with Oregon Youth Authority) Trask River High School. Tillamook schools are known across the state for their district-wide natural resource program, their state champion speech team, their positive school environments, and their innovative instructional practices.

Past directors of the district include Walter T. West (1890s) and Benjamin L. Eddy (1900–02).

== Boundary ==
The district, in Tillamook County, includes Tillamook, Cape Meares, Fairview, Idaville, Netarts, Oceanside, and Pleasant Valley.

== Demographics ==
In 2019, the total minority enrollment was 32% and 45% of students are economically disadvantaged (45% of students are on free or reduced lunches). In the 2009 school year, the district had 32 students classified as homeless by the Department of Education, or 1.6% of students in the district.

== Academics ==
Tillamook High School is ranked 110th within Oregon. Advanced Placement coursework and exams are offered to students and the AP participation rate at Tillamook High School is 15%. Compared to state scores, Tillamook high school scored average proficiency on mathematics and above average proficiency on reading.
