= Tillamook Air Museum =

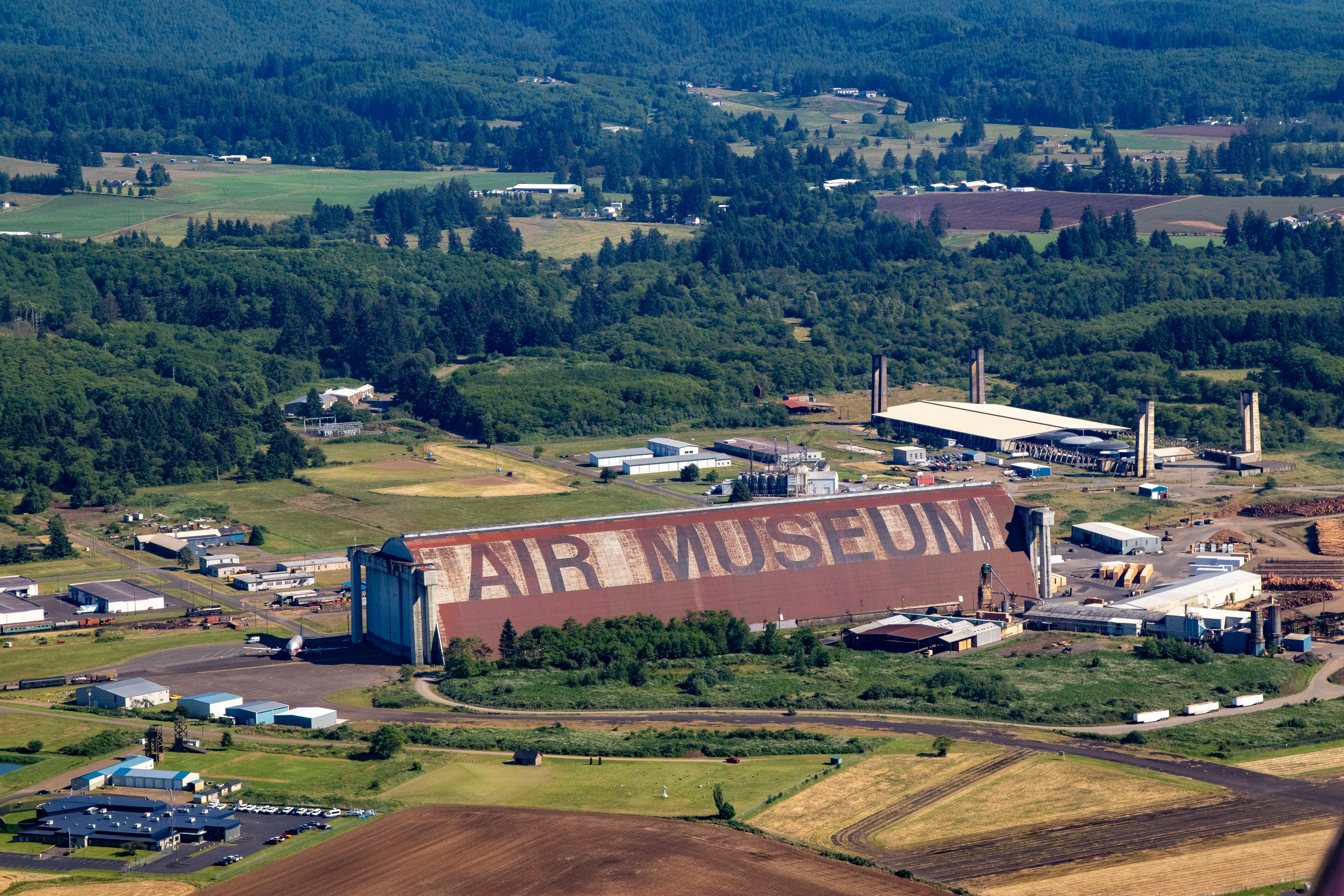

- Location within Oregon
- Established: 1994
- Location: Tillamook, Oregon
- Coordinates: 45.420391°N 123.804835°W
- Type: Aviation museum
- Curator: Christian Gurling
- Website: tillamookair.com

The Tillamook Air Museum is an aviation museum south of Tillamook, Oregon, United States. The museum is located at a former U.S. Navy Air Station and housed in a former blimp hangar, known as "Hangar B", which is the largest clear span wooden structure in the world.

== History ==
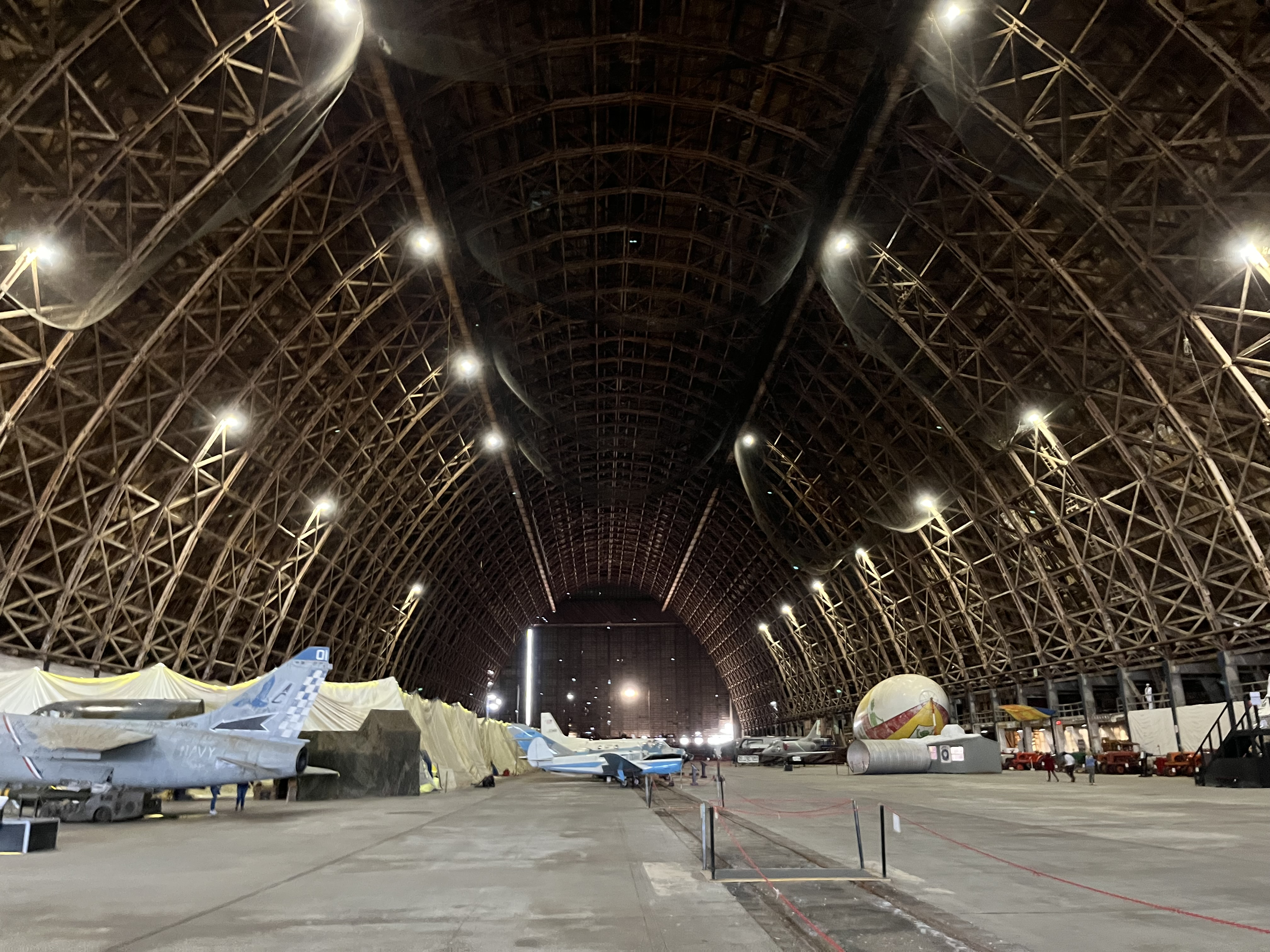
The interior of the Tillamook Air Museum a few months prior to the damage caused in December of 2025

The six-blimp hangar was built by the United States Navy in 1942 during World War II for Naval Air Station Tillamook. It is 1,072 feet (327 m) long and 296 feet (90 m) wide, covering more than 7 acres (2.8 ha). It stands 192 feet (59 m) tall. Each door weighs 30 short tons (27 t) and are 120 feet (37 m) tall. Its companion building, Hangar "A", was destroyed by fire on August 22, 1992.

The Blimp Hangar Museum was opened in mid to late May 1992. It was founded by the Port of Tillamook, in part, to help alleviate the cost of maintaining the hangars and also based on rumors that one or both of them would be torn down. The Mini Guppy was flown to the museum in September 1993.

With the addition of Jack Erickson's collection in mid 1995, it became known as the Tillamook Naval Air Station Museum. The aerial portion of the museum's first airshow was cancelled after its director, John H. Matlock, was killed on 11 October 1996 in the crash of an L-29 during practice the day before the event.

By late 2000, the museum was being referred to as the Tillamook Air Museum.

An engineering report in 2011 revealed that the condition of the structure was worse than initially thought. By the end of the year, both Newport and Astoria were competing to try to entice the museum to move to their communities. In April 2013, Erickson Air Tanker announced that it would not be renewing its lease on the building and instead moving the portion of the collection owned by Jack Erickson to Madras, Oregon. The aircraft had begun to be moved to the new location by early May 2014. In November 2014, the owners of Hangar B, the Port of Tillamook Bay, announced that they would continue operation of the Tillamook Air Museum with the remaining collection.

In 2016, the Classic Aircraft Aviation Museum moved some aircraft to the museum.

In 2021, the museum received a B-52 cockpit on loan from Scroggins Aviation Mockup & Effects. The A-4B that served as a gate guard was dismounted and replaced with a metal scale blimp model in 2022.

In 2025, the museum announced it would be receiving an HU-25. Later that year it began fundraising for the restoration of its F-14. In July, it revealed it was being given an AV-8B. At the end of the month, the Port of Tillamook proposed a study for structural repairs to Hangar B. In December, a large hole was opened in the hangar when an approximately 170 by 30 foot section of the roof was folded over by strong winds. Estimates to repair and fully restore the building are at least $20 million. In May 2026, the museum announced that it had applied for funding from FEMA to help pay for the repairs. Later that month, the museum announced the director's resignation. The following day, the Port of Tillamook Bay board voted against repairs to the hangar. The museum announced in July that work to remove the dislodged piece of roof was due to begin soon. It received the FEMA grant in August.

A week later, the Port of Tillamook agreed to sell the museum and its assets to the Vintage Aviation Museum, a non-profit aviation collection founded by Sean O'Brien. For its part, VAM stated that it plans to relocate most of the 13 aircraft in its collection from its existing site in Spanish Fork, Utah to the museum. O'Brien, an airport construction contractor and former Tillamook Air Museum volunteer, also set an eventual goal of replacing the roof and restoring the hangar doors to operation. Removal of the roof piece began in mid September. Shortly thereafter, the museum was officially sold and plans announced for it to reopen in the undamaged southern part of the hangar in October. (Note: Due to the fact that the port had already pledged to pay for the removal, it could not be officially sold until after it was completed.) The museum reopened on 29 October 2026.

== Collection ==
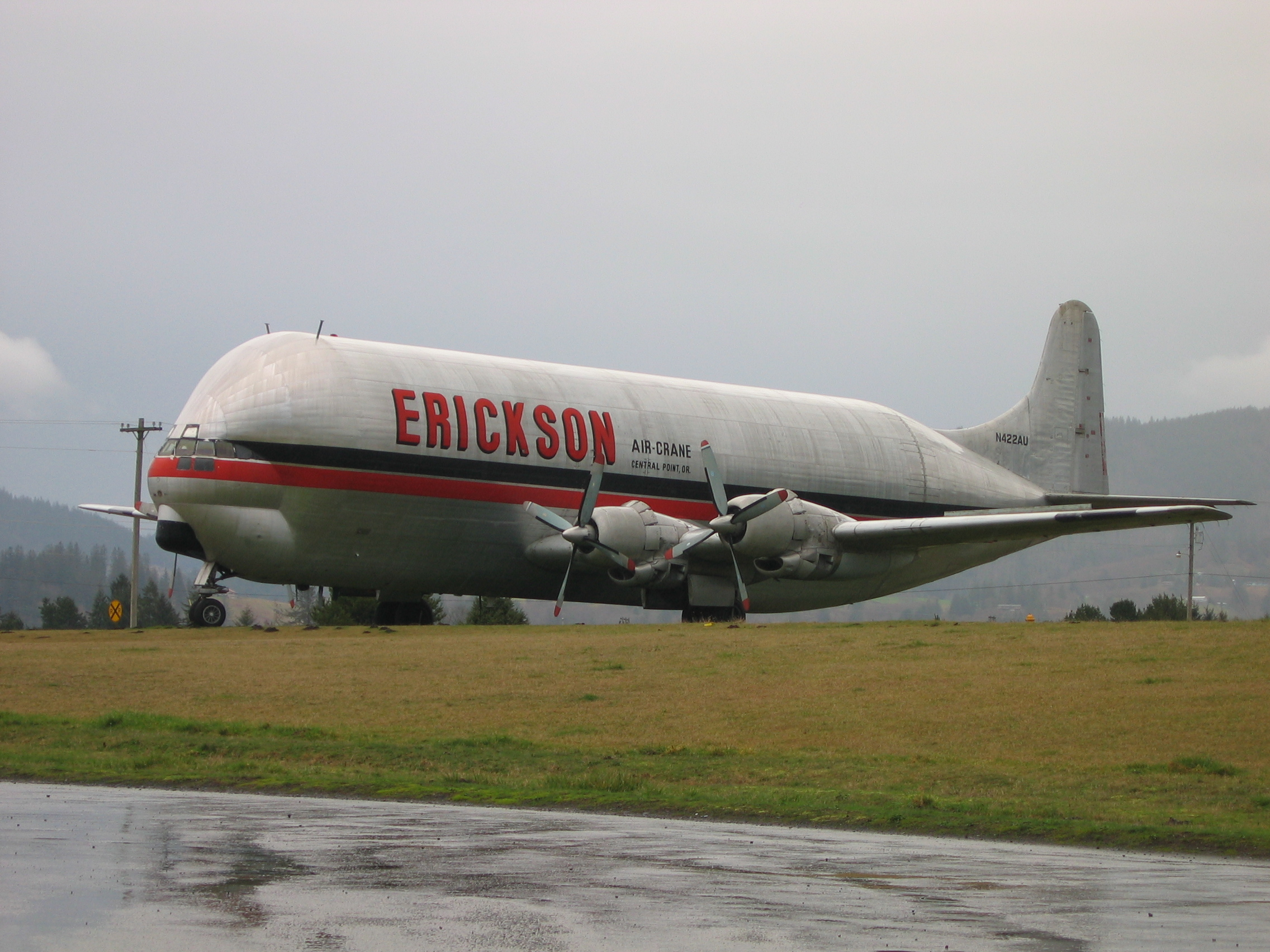
Aero Spacelines Mini Guppy

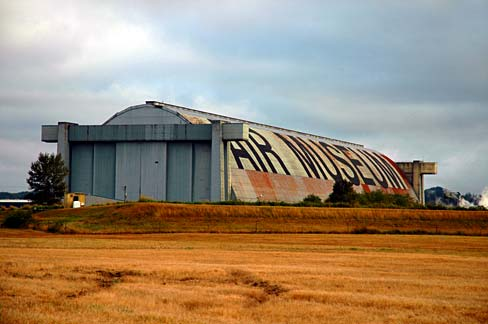
External shot of Hangar B

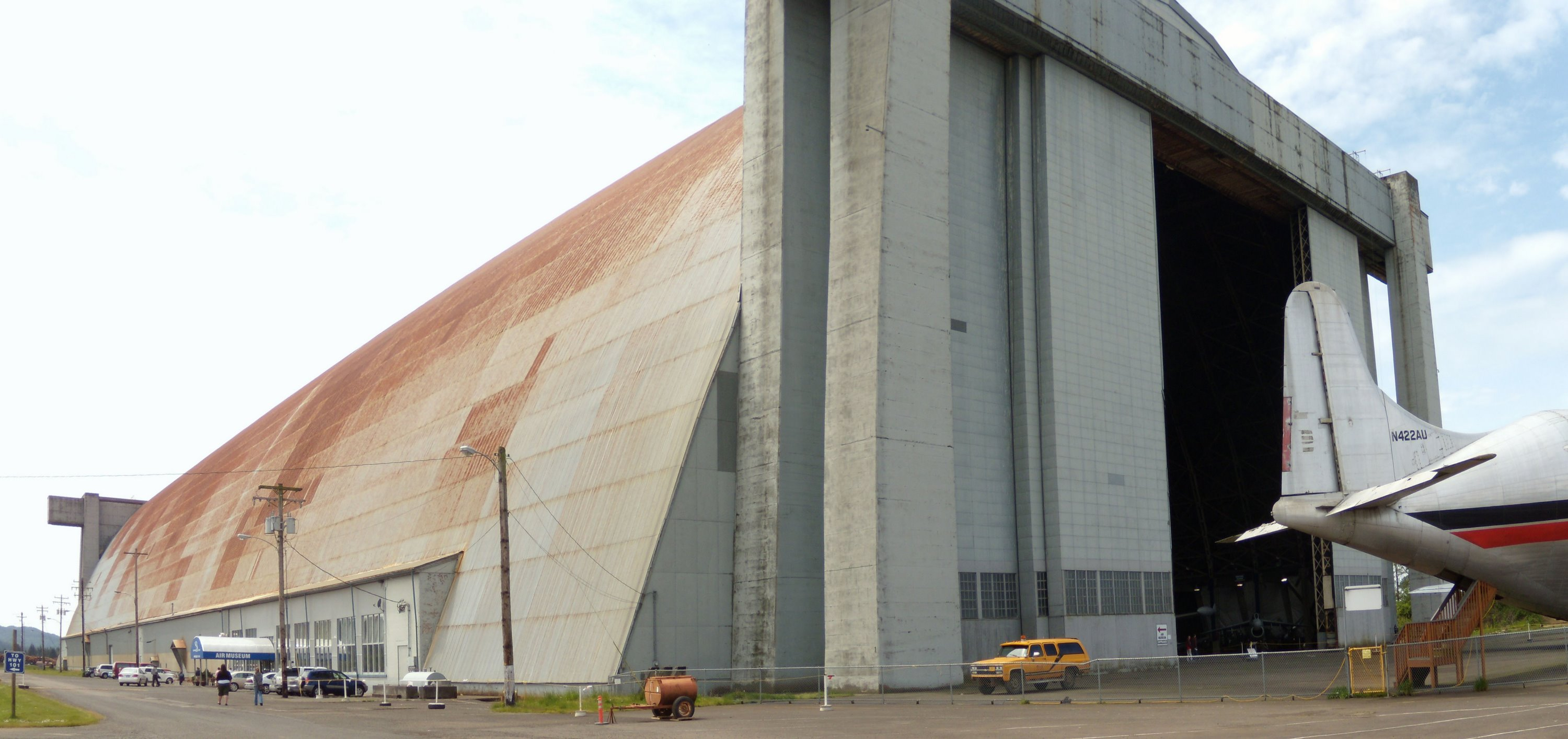
Hangar B, Tillamook Air Museum

=== Aircraft on display ===
- Aero Spacelines Mini Guppy
- Alenia C-27A Spartan
- BAC Jet Provost
- Boeing B-52G Stratofortress – cockpit
- Boeing 727 – cockpit
- Bell TH-57C Sea Ranger
- Bellanca 14-13 Cruisair Senior
- Brown Starlite
- Cessna 180F Skywagon
- Chris-Teena Mini Coupe
- Convair 880 – forward fuselage
- Cvjetkovic CA-65 Skyfly
- Douglas A-4B Skyhawk
- Douglas A-26C Invader
- ERCO Ercoupe 415C
- Fairchild GK-1
- Fisher R-80 Tiger Moth
- Grumman F-14A Tomcat
- Kaman HTK-1 Huskie
- Lockheed T-33 Shooting Star
- LTV A-7E Corsair II
- McDonnell F-4N Phantom – cockpit
- McDonnell Douglas AV-8B Harrier II
- Nieuport 11 – replica
- Nord 1101 Noralpha
- PZL-Mielec Lim-6bis
- Rans S-4 Coyote
- Rutan Model 61 Long-EZ
- Rutan Quickie
- Ryan PT-22 Recruit
- Stearman PT-17 Kaydet
- WindRyder

=== Exhibits ===
The museum also features an exhibit hall with a large collection of rare historical wartime and aviation themed artifacts including pieces of the great German airship, the LZ-129 Hindenburg, a World War II Luftwaffe flight jacket and a WWII Japanese Army Winter flight suit.

- Anderson air raid shelter walk-thru interactive exhibit
- Curtiss SB2C Helldiver crash exhibit
- Naval Air Station Tillamook pigeon loft walk-thru exhibit
- Spots of Light: To Be a Woman in the Holocaust exhibit
- Virtual reality exhibit: A Journey through the Architectural Legacy of "Hangar B."

== See also ==
- Evergreen Aviation Museum, in McMinnville, Oregon
- Hangar One (Mountain View, California)
- List of aerospace museums
- Marine Corps Air Station Tustin
- Moffett Federal Airfield
- Western Antique Aeroplane & Automobile Museum in Hood River, Oregon
- Navy Air Stations Blimps bases
