= Tillamook County Fair =

County Fair in Oregon, United States

Coordinates: 45.457572°N 123.807532°W

The Tillamook County Fair is an annual event that takes place on the second weekend of August in the city of Tillamook in Tillamook County, Oregon, United States. The county fair was established in 1891. The fairgrounds have the largest facility in the county for conventions, meetings, receptions, and other gatherings. Fair attendance continues to grow, with attendance topping 70,000 annually.

== History ==
The land for the current fairgrounds was donated in 1921, when a county-wide levy of $1 million was passed for acquisition and building of the site.

The fair went on hiatus in 1917–18, 1942–45.

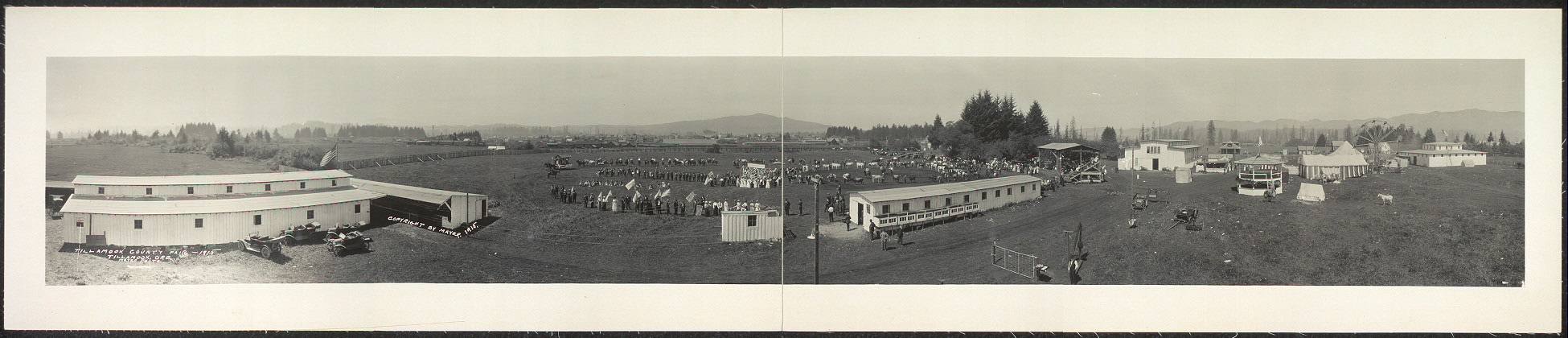
Tillamook County Fair, 1915

== Pig-N-Ford Races ==
The Pig-N-Ford Races, first run in 1925, are an auto racing event staged at the fair and have garnered national appeal over time. The races are held in stripped Model T Fords with stock mechanicals. When the starter pistol fires, the drivers run to the opposite side of the front straight, grab a live 20-pound (9.1 kg) pig from a bin, and must then hand-crank their car and drive it one lap. They then stop, kill the engine, get a different pig, and race another lap. The first driver to complete three laps in this manner without losing their pig is the winner.

Some of the cars that first ran in 1925 are still on the track today.
