= Trask River High School =

Location
- 6820 Barracks Circle; Tillamook, (Tillamook County), Oregon 97141; United States; 45.423508°N 123.795887°W

Information
- Type: Public
- School district: Youth Corrections Education Program
- Principal: Jerry Dorland
- Grades: 9-12
- Enrollment: 72
- Website: Trask River HS website

Trask River High School is a public high school in Tillamook, Oregon, United States.

Trask River High School operates at two adjacent facilities: Camp Tillamook and the Tillamook Youth Accountability Camp. Tillamook School District is contracted to provide education at both locations.

== Academics ==
In 2008, 13% of the school's seniors received their high school diploma. Of 30 students, four graduated, two dropped out, and 24 were still in high school the following year.
