= Benjamin L. Eddy =

American attorney and politician

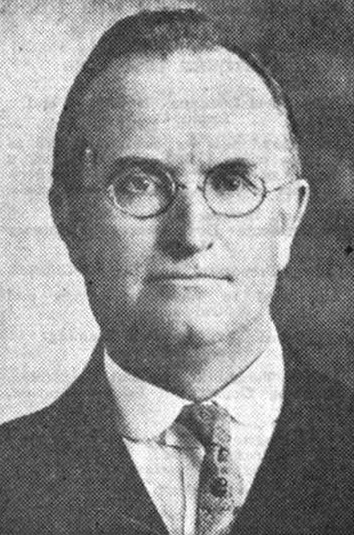

Mayor of Tillamook, Oregon
- In office 1898–1900

Member of the Oregon House of Representatives from the 14^{th} District
- In office 1900–1903
- Preceded by: J. W. Maxwell
- Succeeded by: W. T. West

Member of the Oregon State Senate from the 5^{th} District
- In office 1917–1933
- Preceded by: Kathryn Clarke
- Succeeded by: Walter S. Fisher

Personal details
- Born: October 30, 1865 Washington County, Oregon
- Died: December 25, 1942 (aged 77) Roseburg, Oregon
- Cause of death: cardiac arrest
- Party: Republican
- Profession: attorney

Benjamin Lee Eddy (October 30, 1865 – December 25, 1942) was an American attorney and politician. He was a member of the Republican Party and served in several capacities as a public official. During his time in the Oregon House of Representatives, Eddy authored a bill, which eventually became law, that created a state-wide corporate tax.

== Early life ==
Eddy was born on October 30, 1865, in Washington County, Oregon, to Seth and Mary Eddy. He was educated in public schools where he learned about telegraphy. This led him to a career as a telegraph operator after school. He worked for several different firms along the Pacific Coast and eventually taught himself shorthand. He joined the Northern Pacific Railroad in 1886 as the personal secretary for the district superintendent. Eddy joined the Oregon Pacific Railroad a few years later as the company's auditor. In 1891, Eddy was hired as secretary for Simeon Gannett Reed's Bunker Hill & Sullivan Mine Company. He worked out of their offices in Portland, Oregon and San Francisco, [ California.

Eddy enrolled in the law department at the University of Oregon in Eugene, graduating in 1894. During that time he was working at the law office of Milton W. Smith. He resigned in 1895 to pursue an independent legal practice. Eddy moved his family to Tillamook in 1896. The following year he became one of the stockholders in the fledgling Tillamook Water Company, which started with a capital stock of $20,000.

== Political career ==
In December 1897, Eddy was elected Mayor of Tillamook, Oregon. He also served as Deputy District Attorney for Tillamook County. In 1900, Eddy was one of the delegates for Tillamook County's chapter of the McKinley Club, which was dedicated to re-electing Republican President William McKinley. In March 1900, Eddy was elected chair of the Tillamook School District. During the Republican Party convention in 1900, Eddy put himself forward as a nominee for Oregon House of Representatives for the 14^{th} District, which encompassed all of Tillamook and Yamhill counties. He was nominated at the Republican convention which was held in Portland at the Marquam Grand Opera House in April 1900. He was elected in June 1900.

Following his election to the Oregon House of Representatives, Eddy announced he would support a bill that would reform the state's primary elections to allow for direct elections, as opposed to a party convention system for candidate nominations. He also announced his intention to support Thomas A. McBride's nomination for United States Senator from Oregon over eventual winner Henry W. Corbett. In January 1901, Eddy called for an end to salmon fishing in the Trask, Tillamook, Miami and Kilchis rivers to protect the fishing industry. He also set up a meeting with Oregon Fish Warden Reed to evaluate the best site for a fish hatchery. To that point, a hatchery had not been built in Tillamook County. Eddy eventually met with the Oregon Fish Warden, H. G. Van Dusen following Reed's retirement. Van Dusen approved the hatchery site in April 1901. In 1901, the Multnomah County Republican delegation in the Oregon Legislature gifted Eddy a gold watch for helping protect their interests.

Eddy was a proponent of improving Tillamook Bay during his time in the Oregon House of Representatives and secured state funds to survey and estimate the cost of the project in 1901. The Port of Tillamook Commission appointed Eddy to fill a vacancy on their board in January 1902. Eddy announced he was running for re-election for the Oregon House of Representatives in 1902. His opponent for the Republican nomination, J. W. Maxwell, was supported by United States Senator Joseph Simon, Eddy's political adversary. During the Republican primary in March 1902, Eddy was re-nominated for his seat in the Oregon House of Representatives. During the general election in 1902, Eddy campaign on abolishing the office of roadmaster, which was praised by the Democratic Party newspaper the Tillamook Headlight. He was named as a potential candidate for Speaker of the Oregon House of Representatives by The Oregonian if he won re-election. Eddy held several campaign events in various towns in the district including Beaver, Carlton, Dayton, McMinnville, Newberg and Oretown. Eddy defeated the Democratic nominee Charles Grissen and Progressive nominee T. L. Jones during the general election.

In spite of support from the Multnomah County Republican delegation in the Oregon House of Representatives, Eddy was not able to secure enough votes to be elected speaker for the 1903 legislative session, losing to Lawrence T. Harris. Eddy drafted a bill that would implement a state-wide corporate tax. For-profit corporations would be taxed one tenth on the first $100,000 in capital stock and one half that rate for the next $100,000 in capital stock. At no point could the tax be lower than $25 for businesses. Charities and religious groups would be taxed a flat $5 per year. Eddy's name was floated as a potential choice for Oregon's 1st congressional district, which was vacant at the time. Binger Hermann was the eventual nominee with Eddy receiving two votes on the final ballot of voting at the Republican congressional convention that was held in April 1903 in Eugene, Oregon. Eddy received as many as 18 votes. In the run-up to the 1903 general election, Eddy campaigned to elect Hermann.

== Business career ==
Along with Thomas Coates and Carl Haberlach, Eddy was one of the incorporators of the Abstract & Trust Company with $400 in stock. In March 1902, Eddy helped create the Tillamook County Bank which began with a capital stock of $10,000.

== Personal life and death ==
Eddy married Laura Applewhite of Corvallis, Oregon. He died of a heart attack at the age of 77 while spending the Christmas holiday at the home of his daughter and son-in-law.
