= KDEP =

KYTE
- Garibaldi, Oregon; United States
- Broadcast area: Tillamook, Oregon
- Frequency: 105.5 MHz
- Branding: KYTE FM 105.5

Programming
- Format: Hot adult contemporary

Ownership
- Owner: Alexandra Communications, Inc.
- Sister stations: KTIL, KTIL-FM

History
- First air date: 2001 (as KDEP)
- Former call signs: KDEP

Technical information
- Licensing authority: FCC
- Facility ID: 78488
- Class: A
- ERP: 320 watts
- HAAT: 360 meters (1,180 ft)
- Transmitter coordinates: 45°27′59″N 123°55′11″W

Links
- Public license information: Public file; LMS
- Website: tillamookradio.com

KYTE (105.5 FM) is a radio station licensed to Garibaldi, Oregon, United States. The station is currently owned by Alexandra Communications, Inc.

On March 31, 2025, KDEP changed their call letters to KYTE.
