= Naval Air Station Tillamook =

Naval Air Station Tillamook, located just south of Tillamook, Oregon, was a U.S. Naval Air Station during World War II. Commissioned in 1942 and decommissioned in 1948, it was used primarily to house blimps. The station was the base of operations for Squadron ZP-33, with a complement of 8 K-ships. Each hangar was designed to house up to six blimps.

US Naval Air Station Dirigible Hangar B, listed on the U.S. National Register of Historic Places, is on the station.

== US Naval Air Station Dirigible Hangar B ==
- US Naval Air Station Dirigible Hangar B
- U.S. National Register of Historic Places
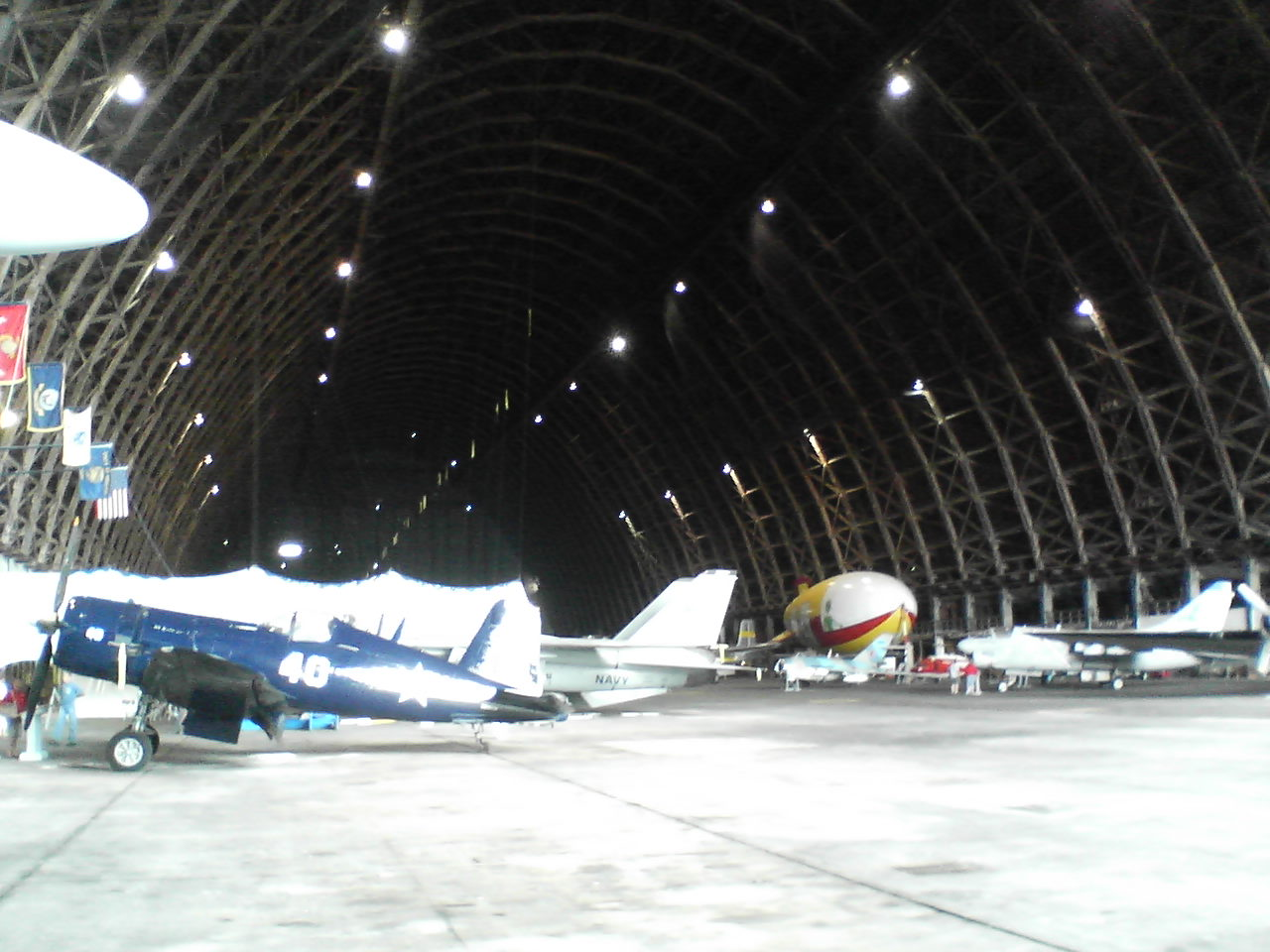
- Tillamook Air Museum interior

- Location within Oregon
- Nearest city: Tillamook, Oregon
- Coordinates: 45°25′4″N 123°48′15″W
- Built: 1943
- Architect: US Bureau of Yards and Docks; Sound Construction & Engineering Co.
- NRHP reference No.: 89000201
- Added to NRHP: March 29, 1989

Due to rationing during World War II, the hangars were built entirely of wood. Hangar B was listed on the National Register of Historic Places in 1989 and remains one of the world's largest wooden structures; it currently houses the Tillamook Air Museum. Hangar A was destroyed by a fire on August 22, 1992.

The Erickson Group who once ran the museum made the decision to move their privately owned aircraft in April 2013, to move from Tillamook to Madras, Oregon. The move date was decided and the Erickson Group moved in January 2016 to Madras, Oregon. The Tillamook Air Museum continues to operate as a historical site and museum, housing multiple aviation related exhibits and aircraft. The museum is open year round, check their website for current hours, admissions, upcoming events and exhibits.

== See also ==
- Aircraft Warning Service
- Navy Air Stations Blimps bases
- US Navy airships during World War II

Related lists

- List of airships of the United States Navy
