= KTIL-FM =

Radio station in Oregon, US

- Bay City, Oregon; United States
- Broadcast area: Tillamook, Oregon
- Frequency: 95.9 MHz
- Branding: KTIL Real Country

Programming
- Format: Country

Ownership
- Owner: Alexandra Communications, Inc.
- Sister stations: KDEP, KTIL

History
- First air date: 2005 (as KIXT)
- Former call signs: KIXT (2005–2010)

Technical information
- Licensing authority: FCC
- Facility ID: 164182
- Class: A
- ERP: 450 watts
- HAAT: 360 meters (1,180 ft)
- Transmitter coordinates: 45°27′59″N 123°55′11″W

Links
- Public license information: Public file; LMS
- Website: tillamookradio.com

KTIL-FM (95.9 FM, "KTIL Country") is a radio station licensed to serve Bay City, Oregon, United States. The station is owned by Alexandra Communications, Inc., of Walla Walla, Washington.

KTIL-FM broadcasts a country music format to the greater Tillamook, Oregon, area.

== History ==
Horizon Broadcasting Group, LLC, received the original construction permit for this station from the Federal Communications Commission on February 24, 2005. The new station was assigned the call sign KIXT by the FCC on April 6, 2005.

In April 2005, Horizon Broadcasting Group, LLC, reached an agreement to sell the construction permit for this station to Tom Hodgins-owned Alexandra Communications, Inc., for a reported cash price of $150,000. The deal was approved by the FCC on June 14, 2005, and the transaction was consummated on August 2, 2005.

KIXT received its license to cover from the FCC on January 11, 2006.

The station changed call signs to KTIL-FM on June 10, 2010.
