= Tillamook County Creamery Association =

American dairy cooperative

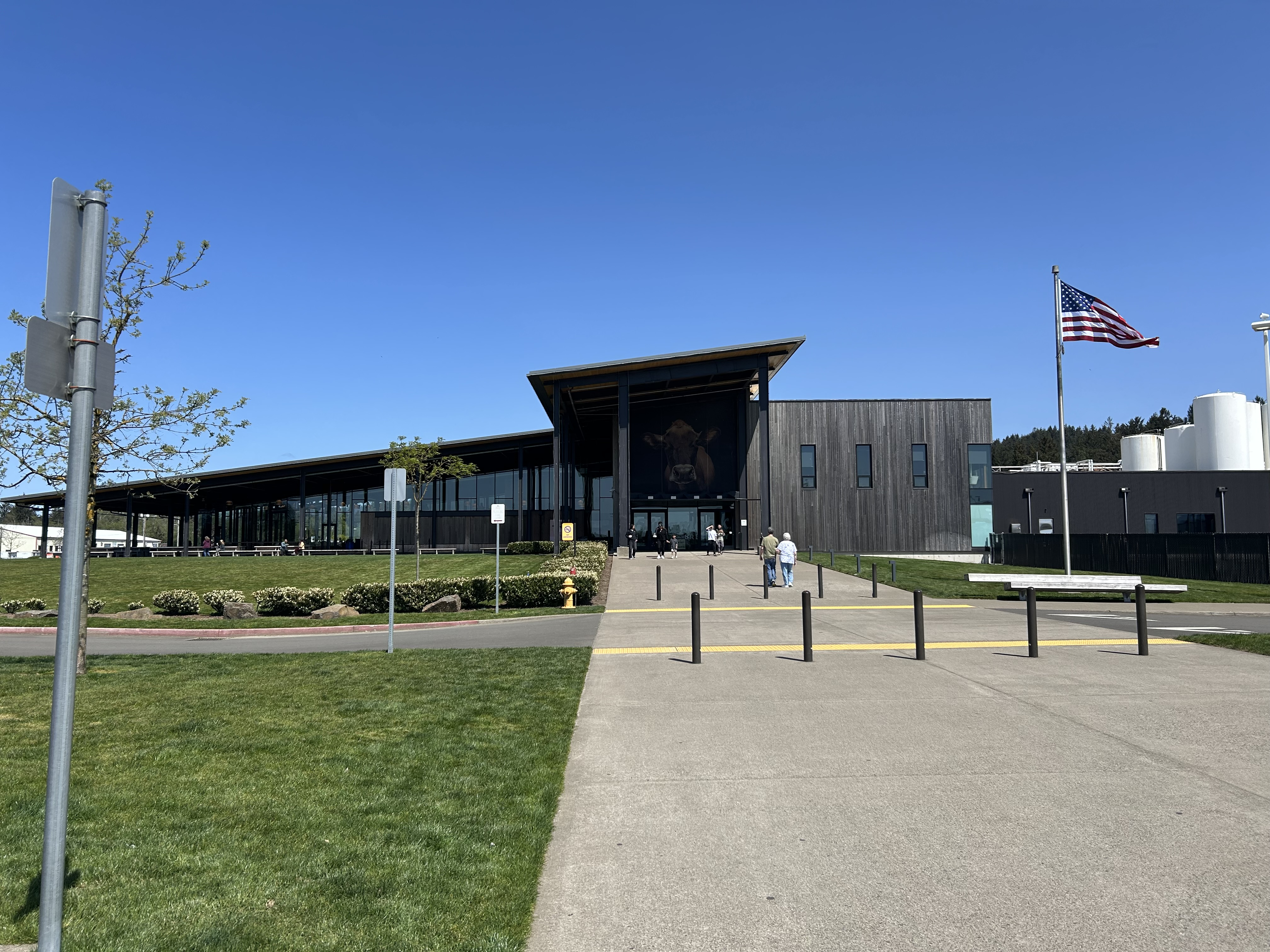
- Tillamook Creamery in 2025
- Type: Agricultural cooperative
- Industry: Dairy products
- Founded: 1909; 117 years ago
- Headquarters: Tillamook County, Oregon, United States
- Products: Cheese, ice cream, yogurt, sour cream, butter, cream cheese spread
- Website: www.tillamook.com

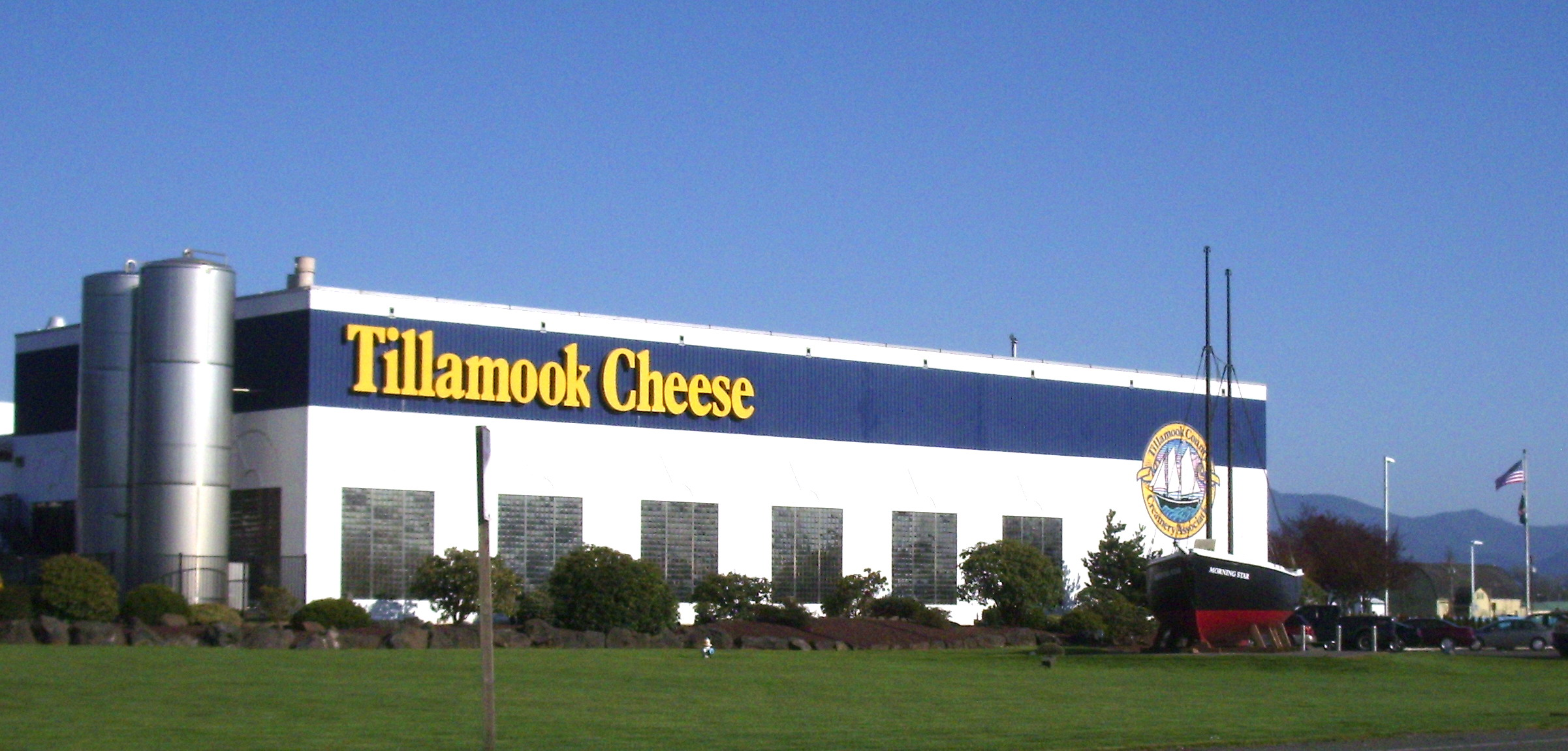
Tillamook Creamery in 2008, prior to its 2018 remodel.

The Tillamook County Creamery Association (TCCA) is a farmer-owned dairy cooperative headquartered in Tillamook County, Oregon, United States. The association manufactures and sells dairy products under the "Tillamook" brand name. Its main facility is the Tillamook Creamery, located two miles north of the city of Tillamook on U.S. Route 101.

According to the trade magazine Dairy Foods, Tillamook, the 44th largest dairy processor in North America, posted $1 billion in sales in 2021. TCCA employs nearly 900 people in Oregon and is the largest employer in Tillamook County. The brand is strongest on the West Coast but sells in all 50 states. It routinely wins awards from the American Cheese Society and other groups.

The cooperative includes nearly 60 dairy farms, mostly within Tillamook County. The cooperative markets several processed dairy products, including cheese, ice cream, butter, sour cream, and yogurt, some of which are manufactured by the cooperative itself and other products which are produced under licensing agreements with various partner companies. Their most notable product is Tillamook cheese, including the most popular cheese: Tillamook Cheddar. In March 2010, Tillamook's Medium Cheddar cheese won the gold medal in the 2010 World Cheese Championship Cheese Contest hosted by the Wisconsin Cheese Makers Association in Madison, Wisconsin. The cheese scored 99.6 out of 100 points possible, beating 59 other entries.

== History ==
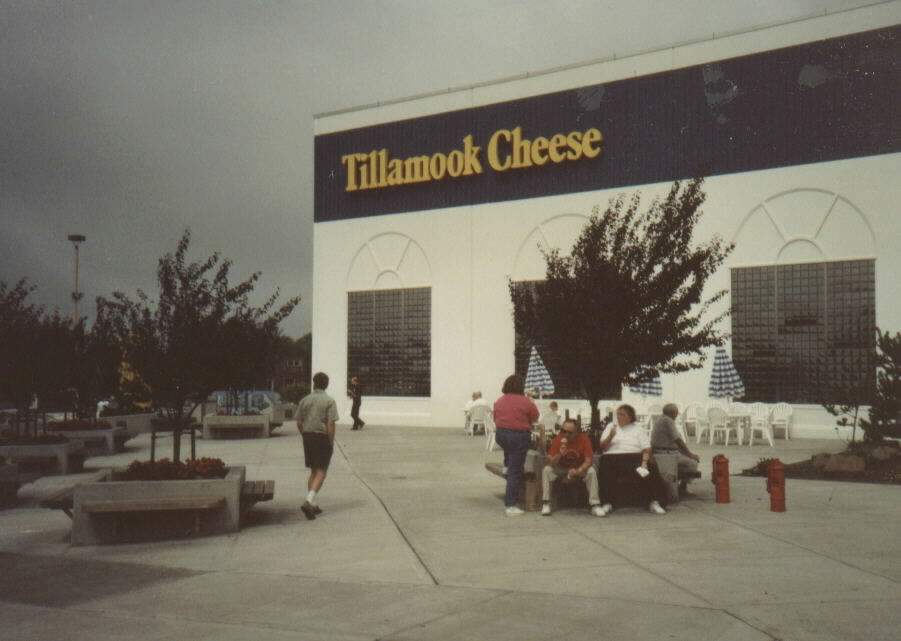
Exterior of the factory in 1992

The Tillamook Valley was ideal for dairy cattle in the mid-19th century, but transporting the milk and butter over the mountains surrounding the valley was a problem. In 1854, several farmers from the county built a schooner named the Morning Star to transport butter to Portland, Oregon; the schooner is now featured as part of the co-op's logo, and a replica (constructed in 1992 by master shipwright Richard Miles of Aberdeen, Washington) is on display at The Tillamook Cheese Factory. Peter McIntosh and T. S. Townsend established the county's first cheese factory in 1894. The association was founded by ten independent creameries in 1909. TCCA hired an ad agency and began campaigning in 1917 in Los Angeles, San Francisco, and Portland.

Under secretary-manager George R. Lawson (CEO- 1944-1950), the cooperative began producing rindless cheese in 1946 and bottled milk the following year. In 1949, partnering with four independent plants and with financing arranged through First National Bank, the Tillamook Cheese Factory north of Tillamook was built. The enlarged facility included a storage plant and traffic department.

Columbia River Processing, Inc., a second cheese-making facility, was built in Boardman, Oregon, in September 2001. Its production capacity doubled TCCA's cheesemaking capabilities.

In 2009, Tillamook County Creamery Association celebrated 100 years in business.

== Tillamook Creamery ==
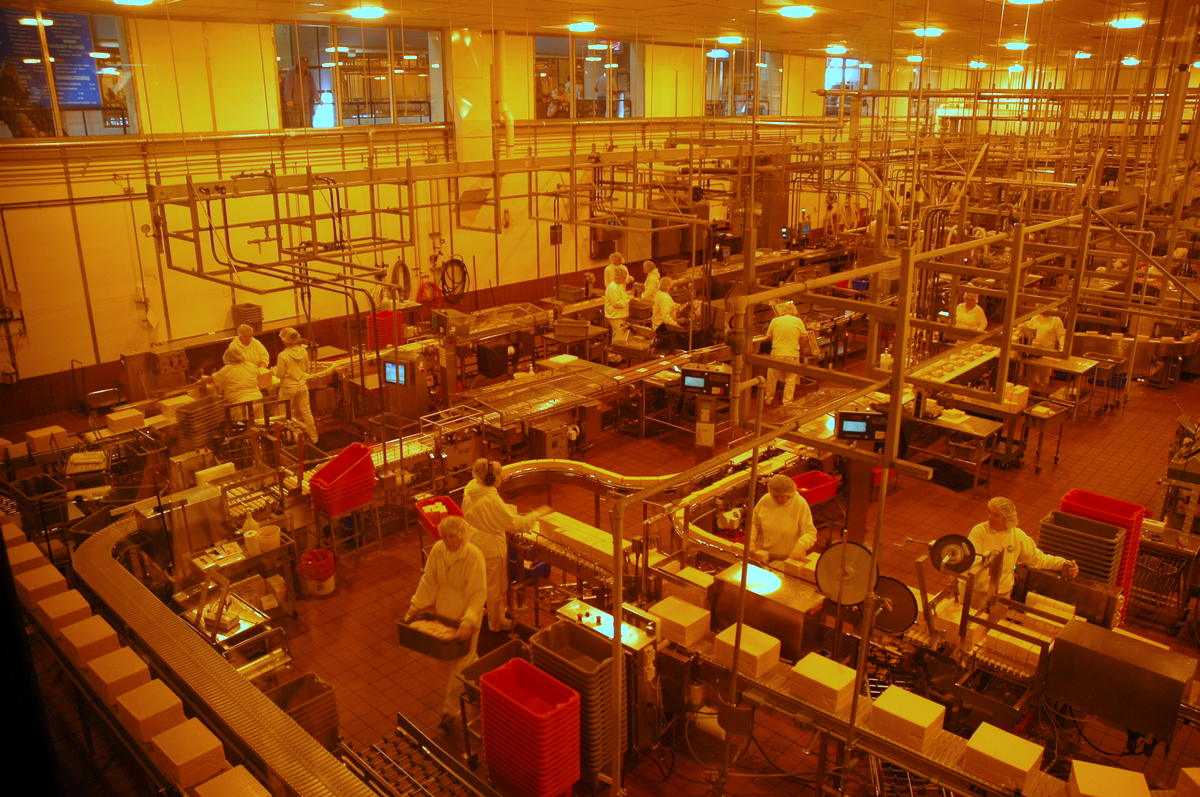
Inside the Tillamook Cheese Factory

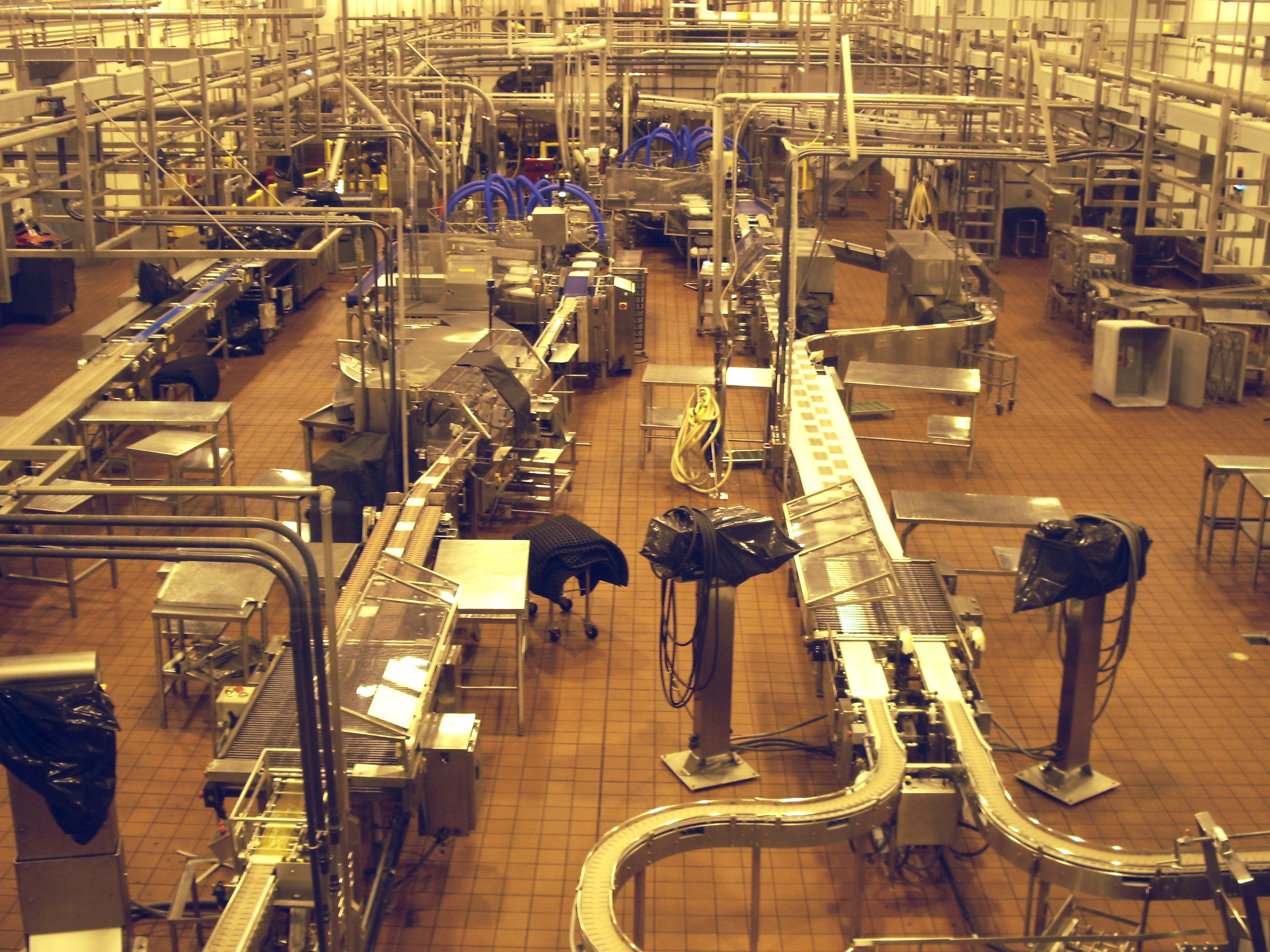
Tillamook plant small cheese block processing lines

The Tillamook Cheese Factory, located at 4165 U.S. 101 North in Tillamook, Oregon, is the Tillamook County Creamery Association's original cheese production facility. The Tillamook Cheese Factory also has a visitor center, the Tillamook Creamery, and hosts over 1.3 million tourists annually. Visitors can learn about the cheesemaking process, cheese packaging process, and the ice cream-making process from a viewing gallery over the main production floor. Tours are self-guided, self-paced, and augmented by video presentations and interactive kiosks.

Tours inside the actual cheese processing area of the plant were discontinued in 1967 due to health and safety regulations. A new visitors center was opened in June 2018 with 38,500 square feet (3,580 m^{2}) of exhibit and viewing space. The center also includes a dining area and gift store.

The Tillamook Cheese Factory produces more than 170,000 pounds of cheese daily and packages approximately one million pounds on-site each week. The factory warehouse can age 50 million pounds of cheese. The cooperative also operates the aforementioned cheesemaking facilities in Boardman, Oregon, and contracts some of its packaging and distribution to Marathon Cheese in Mountain Home, Idaho, and Great Lakes Cheese in Salt Lake City.

== Marketing ==
Tillamook had a "Loaf Love Tour" featuring customized Volkswagen "Baby Loaf" busses that sample cheese at grocery stores and community events. Tillamook commercials on television include its "Food Loves Tillamook" campaign, "Dairy Done Right" campaign, and "Goodbye Big Food, Hello Real Food" campaign. Tillamook sponsored the Grilled Cheese Invitational in 2010 and 2011.

== Controversy ==
TCCA bought the cheese cooperative in Bandon, Oregon, in 2000. After buying the Bandon Cheese factory and its brand name, Tillamook's lawyers warned several South Coast businesses with "Bandon" in their names that they might need to make a "content change" to avoid confusion with the cheese. This controversy made international news, particularly in 400-year-old Bandon, Ireland, where residents have milked cows for generations.

The cooperative ran into additional controversy in 2004 with its attempted enforcement of the Tillamook Cheese and Bandon Cheese trademarks against local businesses, such as Tillamook Country Smoker, a purveyor of jerky and smoked meats for over 30 years. The creamery tried to stop the meat company from using the name "Tillamook". In that 2004 case, a federal judge ruled that Tillamook Country Smoker could register its name as a trademark, but that Tillamook Country Smoker could not use or register the Tillamook Jerky mark.

However, the move that garnered Tillamook the most nationwide attention came in 2005 after a slew of consumer inquiries about dairies' use of a genetically engineered bovine growth hormone designed to boost milk production. The U.S. Food and Drug Administration had said milk products derived from cows injected with the hormone were safe, but consumer worries about potential cancer risks persisted. Over objections from some member farmers and biotechnology giant Monsanto, which manufactured the hormone, Tillamook County Creamery Association voted to require all of its dairy suppliers to phase out its use. Tillamook was one of the first big national dairy brands to make such a decision.

In early 2018, a large "mega-dairy" near Boardman, Oregon, producing milk for Tillamook, was fined and ultimately sued by the state of Oregon for repeated violations of its wastewater permit. The mega-dairy, Oregon's second-largest, was approved by state regulators for 30,000 cows in early 2017 despite opposition from local and national environmental and animal welfare groups and small-farm advocates. Shortly after state regulators sued the facility, Tillamook stated that it had terminated its contract, but continued to purchase milk from the operation.
