= Tees Maar Khan =

Tees Maar Khan (transl. He, who killed thirty) may refer to:

- Mahboob Ali Khan, popularly known as "Tees Maar Khan"
- Tees Maar Khan (1955 film), 1955 Indian Hindi-language film
- Tees Maar Khan (1963 film), 1963 Pakistani Punjabi film
- Tees Maar Khan (2010 film), 2010 Indian Hindi-language film
- Tees Maar Khan (2022 film), 2022 Indian Telugu-language film
