= Cvjetkovic CA-65 =

1960s American homebuilt monoplane aircraft

CA-65 Skyfly
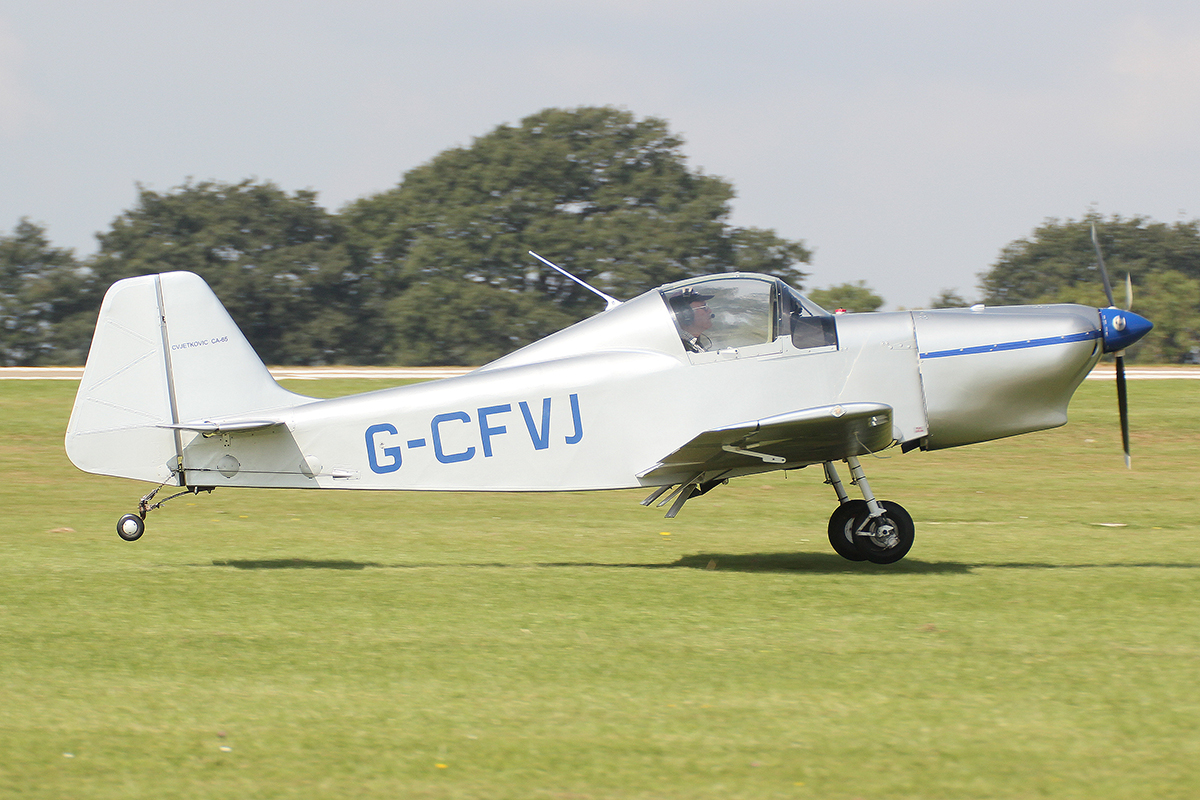

General information
- Type: Two-seat homebuilt monoplane
- Manufacturer: Cvjetkovic Aircraft
- Designer: Anton Cvjetkovic
- Number built: 20+

History
- First flight: 1965

The Cvjetkovic CA-65 Skyfly is a 1960s American homebuilt monoplane aircraft designed by Anton Cvjetkovic.

== Development ==
Designed by Anton Cvjetkovic for home construction, the CA-65 Skyfly is a two-seat (side-by-side) wooden low-wing monoplane with a retractable tailwheel undercarriage and optional folding wings. It was first flown in 1965.

An all-metal version (CA-65A) was also designed to be home-built but does not have the folding wings.

The aircraft has an ICAO Type Designator CA65

== Variants ==
CA-65
Wooden version for home building, available with folding wings
CA-65A
Metal version for home building with swept tail. Rotax 912S power.
CA-65W
Lycoming 108-150 HP

== Specifications (CA-65 with Lycoming) ==
Data from Jane's all the World's Aircraft 1969–70

General characteristics

- Crew: 2
- Length: 19 ft 0 in (5.79 m)
- Wingspan: 25 ft 0 in (7.62 m)
- Width: 9 ft 0 in (2.74 m) wings folded
- Height: 7 ft 4 in (2.24 m)
- Wing area: 108 sq ft (10.0 m^{2})
- Airfoil: NACA 4415 modified
- Empty weight: 900 lb (408 kg)
- Max takeoff weight: 1,500 lb (680 kg)
- Fuel capacity: 28 US gal (23 imp gal; 110 L) in two fuselage tanks
- Powerplant: × Lycoming O-290-G 4-cylinder air-cooled horizontally-opposed piston engine, 125 hp (93 kW)
- Propellers: 2-bladed Sensenich, 5 ft 8 in (1.73 m) diameter fixed-pitch wooden propeller

Performance

- Maximum speed: 160 mph (260 km/h, 140 kn)
- Cruise speed: 135 mph (217 km/h, 117 kn)
- Stall speed: 55 mph (89 km/h, 48 kn)
- Range: 500 mi (800 km, 430 nmi) with maximum fuel
- Service ceiling: 15,000 ft (4,600 m)
- Rate of climb: 1,000 ft/min (5.1 m/s) at sea level
- Take-off run: 450 ft (140 m)
- Landing run: 600 ft (180 m)

Avionics
Bayside BEI-990 radio

== See also ==
Aircraft of comparable role, configuration, and era

- Piel Emeraude
