= KTIL (AM) =

- Netarts, Oregon; United States
- Broadcast area: Tillamook, Oregon
- Frequency: 1590 kHz
- Branding: The Mook

Programming
- Format: Classic rock

Ownership
- Owner: Alexandra Communications, Inc.
- Sister stations: KDEP, KTIL-FM

History
- First air date: August 16, 1947
- Former call signs: KTIL (1947–1993); KMBD (1993–2010)
- Call sign meaning: K TILlamook

Technical information
- Licensing authority: FCC
- Facility ID: 50554
- Class: B
- Power: 5,000 watts (day); 1,000 watts (night)
- Transmitter coordinates: 45°27′24.4″N 123°52′23.5″W
- Translator: 94.3 K232FW (Tillamook)

Links
- Public license information: Public file; LMS
- Website: tillamookradio.com

KTIL (1590 AM) is a radio station licensed to serve Netarts, Oregon, United States. The station, which began broadcasting in 1947, is currently owned by Alexandra Communications, Inc.

== Programming ==
KTIL broadcasts a classic rock format. Weekday programming (until February 2013) previously included nationally syndicated talk shows hosted by former United States Senator Fred Thompson, comedian Dennis Miller, actor Jerry Doyle, and Michael Savage, plus a regional show hosted by Tillamook native Lars Larson.

In addition to its regular oldies programming, KTIL broadcasts Oregon State Beavers football games and the occasional Portland Trail Blazers game when a scheduling conflict on KTIL-FM bumps the NBA contest to the AM station. KTIL-FM carries the football games of the rival University of Oregon Ducks.

In September 2008, the station and its then-sister station KTIL-FM announced their disaster preparedness plans, including regularly scheduled information broadcasts, limited broadcasting hours to conserve generator power, and the ability to transmit bilingual emergency messages from county emergency management officials, even in the event of a tsunami.

== History ==
This station began regular broadcasting on August 16, 1947, as a 250 watt station known as KTIL. KTIL was owned by the Tillamook Broadcasting Company, Inc., with Fred H. Guyton as president and Robert W. Harris as general manager.

KTIL received a construction permit from the Federal Communications Commission (FCC) for a power increase to 1,000 watts in 1961 and began broadcasting with the stronger signal in 1962. Soon after, Tillamook Broadcasting Company, Inc., agree to sell KTIL to Beaver Broadcasting Company in a transaction finalized on December 1, 1962. Philip Tonken was the president of Beaver Broadcasting and Robert Douglas served as general manager of the radio station. In 1967, the station received another authorization to increase its signal strength, this time to the current 5,000 watts during the day and 1,000 watts at night.

In October 1986, Beaver Broadcasting System, Inc., reached an agreement to sell this station to Oregon Eagle, Inc. The deal was approved by the FCC on November 25, 1986, and the transaction was consummated on December 29, 1986.

The station was assigned the KMBD call letters by the FCC on December 20, 1993. The station was renamed in honor of longtime talk show host Mildred Berkey Davy when the AM and FM stations ended their simulcast and the AM station went all-talk.

In March 2010, Alexandra Communications, Inc., reached an agreement to purchase KMBD from Oregon Eagle, Inc., for $150,000. The FCC approved the transfer on April 27, 2010, and the transaction was consummated on June 1, 2010. The new owners had the FCC restore the station's original KTIL call sign on June 9, 2010.

On February 1, 2013 KTIL changed their format from talk to oldies, branded as "True Oldies 1590".

== Former on-air staff ==
- Ramblin' Rod Anders — a Portland, Oregon, children's television host for more than 30 years. His first broadcasting job was at KTIL in the 1950s. Anders sang and played guitar for a Saturday morning show on the radio station until he was drafted into the United States Army.
- Mildred Berkey Davy — the host of It's a Woman's World and other KTIL talk programming for more than 40 years beginning in 1961. Davy was, until her death in October 2005, the oldest regularly scheduled radio personality in the United States. Davy was widely known as "the voice of Tillamook County," and in January 1994 was honored with a change in the station's call sign. KTIL was renamed KMBD after Davy's initials as part of a programming shift, which changed KMBD to an all-talk format while flipping KTIL-FM to an oldies-based adult contemporary music format.
- Lars Larson — a conservative talk radio show host syndicated nationally by Compass Media Networks. Larson landed his first radio job in 1975 at age 16, as a disc jockey and on-air personality for KTIL.
