= Tillamook Bay Community College =

College in Tillamook, Oregon, U.S.

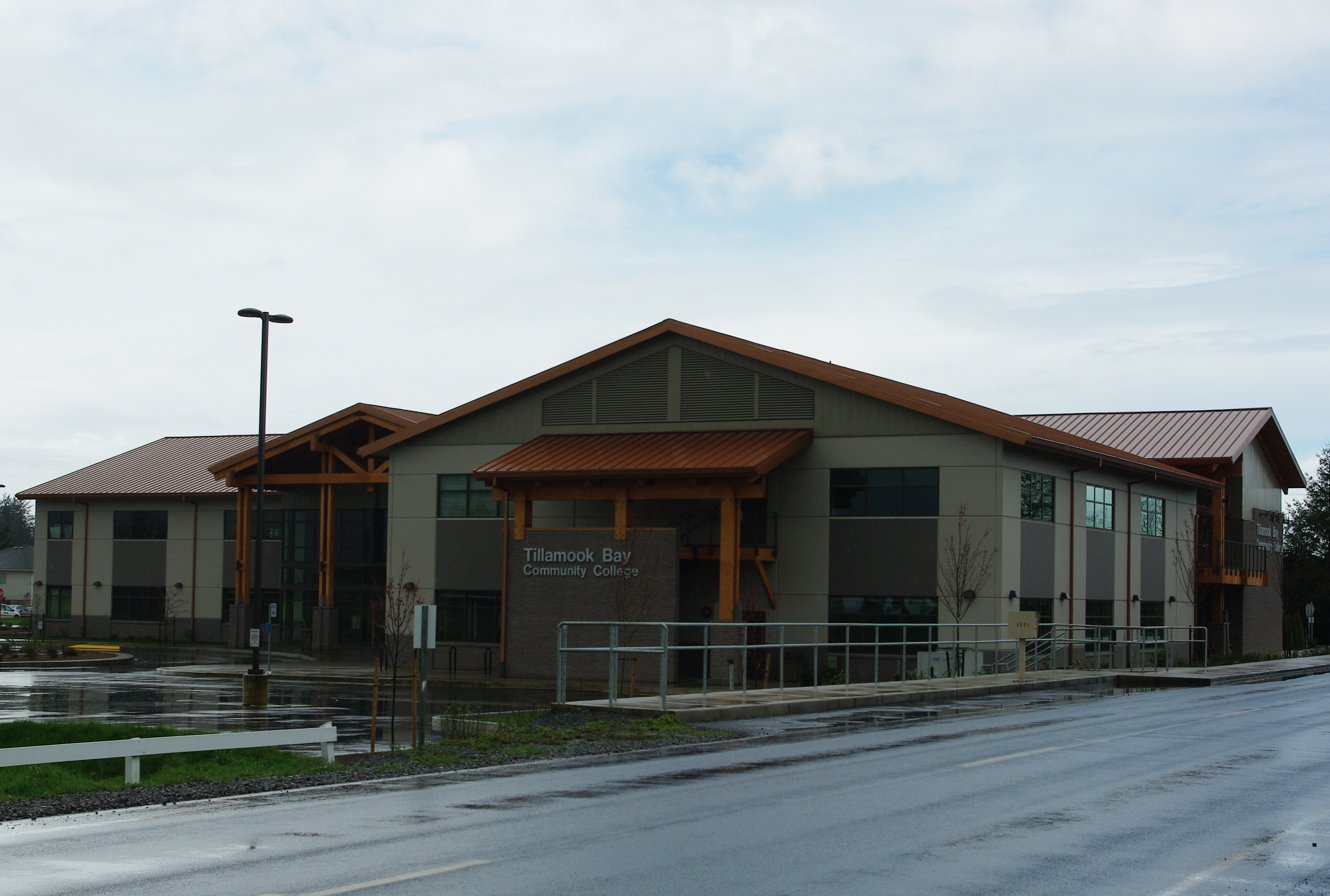
- Campus in Tillamook
- Type: Public community college
- Established: 1981
- Chairman: Mary Faith Bell
- President: Paul Jarrell
- Location: Tillamook, Oregon, United States; 45.4566°N 123.8137°W
- Website: tillamookbaycc.edu

Tillamook Bay Community College (TBCC) is a public community college in Tillamook, Oregon, United States. It was founded in 1981, after Clatsop Community College announced it would no longer offer classes in Tillamook County. The college offers classes at three locations: The Third Street Campus in Tillamook, which is its Primary location; North County Center located at Neah-Kah-Nie High School; and the South County Center in Pacific City, Oregon, on the Nestucca Valley High School Campus.

== See also ==
- List of Oregon community colleges
