= Weber (surname) =

- Language: German

Origin
- Derivation: Weber
- Meaning: weaver
- Region of origin: Germany

Other names
- Variant forms: Waeber, Wäber (Swiss), Weeber, Wieber
- Cognate: Weaver (English)
- Anglicisation: Webber

Weber (/ˈwɛbər/, /ˈwiːbər/ or /ˈweɪbər/ (also /ˈvɛbər/ or /ˈveɪbər/); German: [ˈveːbɐ]) is a surname of German origin, derived from the noun meaning "weaver". In some cases, following migration to English-speaking countries, it has been anglicised to the English surname 'Webber' or 'Weaver'.

Notable people with the surname include:

== Disambiguation of common given names with this surname ==
- Ann Weber (disambiguation), several people
- Arthur Weber (disambiguation), several people
- Ben Weber (disambiguation), several people
- Bruce Weber (disambiguation), several people
- Bruno Weber (disambiguation), several people
- Carl Weber (disambiguation), several people
- Charlie Weber (disambiguation), several people
- Charles Weber (disambiguation), several people
- Christiane Weber (disambiguation), several people
- David Weber (disambiguation), several people
- Ernst Weber (disambiguation), several people
- Friedrich Weber (disambiguation), several people
- George Weber (disambiguation), several people
- Gerard Weber (disambiguation), several people
- Hans Weber (disambiguation), several people
- Heinrich Weber (disambiguation), several people
- Hubert Weber (disambiguation), several people
- John Weber (disambiguation), several people
- Karl Weber (disambiguation), several people
- Marc Weber (disambiguation), several people
- Max Weber (disambiguation), several people
- Otto Weber (disambiguation), several people
- Paul Weber (disambiguation), several people
- Pete Weber (disambiguation), several people
- Ricardo Weber (disambiguation), several people
- Richard Weber (disambiguation), several people
- Robert Weber (disambiguation), several people
- Rudolf Weber (disambiguation), multiple people
- Steven Weber (disambiguation), several people
- Werner Weber (disambiguation), several people

== Academic ==
- Albrecht Weber (1825–1901), German Indologist and historian
- Alfred Weber (1868–1958), German economist, sociologist and theoretician of culture
- Annemarie Weber (1923–2012), German-born American physiologist
- Beda Weber (1798–1859), German professor, author, and politician
- Caroline Weber (author) (1969), American historian
- Eugen Weber (1925–2007), French historian
- Francis J. Weber, American Catholic scholar
- Hans Hermann Weber (1896–1974), German biochemist and physiologist
- Hermann Weber (1928–2014), German historian and political scientist
- Ingeborg Weber-Kellermann (1918–1993), German folklorist, anthropologist and ethnologist
- Isabella Weber (born 1987), German economist active in the United States
- Marianne Weber (1870–1954), sociologist and women's rights activist
- Shlomo Weber (born 1949), Russian economist
- Theodor Weber (1836–1906), German theologian and professor of philosophy

== Arts ==
- Alain Weber (1930–2019), French composer
- Albert Weber Sr. (1829–1879), musician and founder of the Weber Piano Company
- Albert Weber Jr. (1858–1908), Son of Albert Weber Sr. and 2nd president of the Weber Piano Company
- Anna Weber (1814–1888), Canadian Mennonite Fraktur artist
- Bertha Weber (1887–1967), American composer and organist
- Carl Maria von Weber (1786–1826), German composer
- Carlo Weber (1934–2014), German architect
- Chris Weber (born 1966), American musician
- Eberhard Weber (born 1940), German musician
- Henrik Weber (1818–1866), Hungarian portrait painter
- Joan Weber (1935–1981), American popular music singer
- Joseph Miroslav Weber (1854–1906), Czech composer and violinist
- Josepha Weber (1758–1819), German soprano
- Jon Weber (musician) (born 1961), American jazz pianist and composer
- Kem Weber (1889–1963), German furniture and industrial designer, architect, and teacher
- Ludwig Weber (1899–1974), Austrian singer
- Michael Weber (1966–1999), Australian musician; lead guitarist of rock band Seminal Rats

== Business ==
- Gerhard Weber (designer) (1941–2020), German fashion designer and entrepreneur

== Entertainment ==
- Amy Weber (born 1970), American actress, model, film producer, and former professional wrestling valet
- Billy Weber, American film editor
- Clark Weber, American radio personality in Chicago
- Dreya Weber, American actress
- Jacques Weber (born 1949), French actor, director and writer
- Jake Weber (born 1964), English actor
- Joe Weber (vaudevillian) (1867–1942), part of comic double-act Weber and Fields
- Lois Weber (1881–1939), American silent film actress
- Steven Weber (born 1961), American actor, voice actor, comedian and singer

== Finance ==
- Axel A. Weber (born 1957), German economist, former president of the Deutsche Bundesbank

== Literature ==
- Anne Weber, German-French author
- Katharine Weber (born 1955), American novelist
- Ken Weber (1943–2007), American journalist and nature writer
- Lenora Mattingly Weber (1895–1971), American young-adult author

== Mathematics ==
- Eduard Ritter von Weber (1870–1934) German mathematician

== Politics ==
- Albert J. Weber (1859–1925), Associate Justice and Chief Justice of the Utah Supreme Court
- Becky Weber (born 1954), American politician
- Carmen Weber (1945–2007), first wife of former Chilean President Ricardo Lagos
- Ed Weber (1931–2023), U.S. Representative from Ohio
- Gabi Weber (born 1955), German politician
- Gérard Weber (1948–2016), French politician
- Gerald J. Weber (1914–1989), American judge and military officer
- Helene Weber (1891–1962), German politician
- Henri Weber (1944–2020), French politician
- Johann Weber (1828–1878), Swiss politician
- Jonas Weber (born 1982), German politician
- Karl Weber (1936–2026), German politician (CDU)
- Laura Weber (born 1984), German politician
- Manfred Weber (born 1972), German politician
- Melissa Murphy Weber (born 1969), American attorney and Pennsylvania politician
- Olivier Weber (born 1958), French writer, novelist and journalist, ambassador of France, former war correspondent
- Randy Weber, U.S. Representative from Texas
- Renate Weber, Romanian lawyer and human rights activist
- Ricardo Lagos Weber (born 1962), Chilean lawyer and politician, son of former president Ricardo Lagos and Carmen Weber
- Rosa Weber, Brazilian judge
- Vin Weber (born 1952), U.S. Representative from Minnesota

== Religion ==
- Johann Weber (bishop) (1927–2020), Austrian Roman Catholic bishop
- Ludwig Weber (pastor) (1846–1922), German social reformer

== Science ==
- Ann E. Weber, American chemist
- Frédéric Albert Constantin Weber (1830–1903), French botanist
- Frederick Parkes Weber (1863–1962), English dermatologist; son of Hermann David Weber
- Georg Heinrich Weber (1752–1828), German botanist
- Heinrich Friedrich Weber (1843–1912), German physicist, sometimes confused with Heinrich Martin Weber
- Hermann David Weber (1823–1918), German physician who practised medicine in England; also a numismatist
- Joseph Weber (1919–2000), American physicist; developed the laser and gravitational wave detector
- Leonard Weber (1889–1975), Polish beekeeper
- Mary Ellen Weber (born 1963), American former astronaut
- Neal A. Weber (1908–2001), American entomologist
- Wilhelm Eduard Weber (1804–1891), physicist and telegraphy pioneer, after whom the SI unit of magnetic flux is named
- William Alfred Weber (1918–2020), American botanist and professor; originator of herbarium acronyms

== Sport ==
- Adam Weber (born 1987), American football player
- Alson Weber (1910–2005), Canadian volleyball player
- Anthony Weber (born 1987), French footballer
- Brianté Weber (born 1992), American basketball player
- Caroline Weber (gymnast) (born 1986), Austrian rhythmic gymnast
- Darren Weber (born 1972), Zimbabwean cricketer
- Esther Weber (born 1967), German wheelchair fencer
- Garrett Weber-Gale (born 1985), American swimmer
- Gerd Weber (born 1956), German footballer
- Gerard Weber (born 1938), Dutch football player and manager
- Gerard Weber (born 1941), Dutch footballer
- Hartmut Weber (born 1960), German sprinter
- Heiko Weber (born 1965), German football manager
- Heinz Weber (born 1976), German footballer
- Heribert Weber (born 1955), Austrian footballer
- Javier Weber (born 1966), Argentinian volleyball player
- Josip Weber (born 1964), Croatian-Belgian footballer
- Jozef Weber, Czech football player and manager
- Julian Weber, German javelin thrower
- Manuel Weber (born 1985), Austrian footballer
- Marco Weber (born 1982), German speed skater
- Mauricio Weber (born 1982), Uruguayan footballer
- Mike Weber (born 1987), American ice hockey player
- Mike Weber (American football) (born 1997), American football player
- Philipp Weber (born 1992), German handballer
- Ralf Weber (born 1969), German footballer
- Regina Weber (born 1963), German rhythmic gymnast
- Renê Weber (born 1961), Brazilian football player and coach
- Ryan Weber (born 1990), American baseball player
- Shea Weber (born 1985), ice hockey player
- Wally Weber (1903–1984), American football player
- Willi Weber (born 1942), German Formula One manager
- Wolfgang Weber (born 1944), German footballer
- Yannick Weber (born 1988), Swiss ice hockey player

== Weber/Mozart family ==
- Relatives by marriage to Wolfgang Amadeus Mozart
  - Constanze Mozart, Constanze Weber, Mozart's wife
  - Aloysia Weber, her sister
  - Josepha Weber, her sister
  - Sophie Weber, her sister
  - Cäcilia Weber, their mother
  - Carl Maria von Weber composer; cousin of the Weber sisters
  - Max Maria von Weber, civil engineer; son of Carl Maria von Weber

== See also ==
- General Weber (disambiguation)
- Judge Weber (disambiguation)
- Justice Weber (disambiguation)
- von Weber (surname), a German surname
- Weaver (disambiguation), an English variant
- Webber (surname), an English variant
- Weber (disambiguation)
- Wever (disambiguation), a Dutch variant
- Bruno Weber Park, a sculpture garden in Switzerland
- Ritter von Weber, an aristocratic Bavarian family
