= Von Weber (surname) =

von Weber is a German surname based on the name Weber, with the added nobiliary particle "von". Notable people with this name include:

- Carl Maria von Weber (1786–1826), German composer
- Max Maria von Weber (1822–1881), German engineer
- Ritter von Weber, aristocratic German family
  - Eduard Ritter von Weber (1870–1934), German mathematician
- Karl Ritter von Weber (1892–1941), German officer, veteran of World Wars I and II

== See also ==
- Anton von Webern (1883–1945), Austrian composer
