= Gerard Weber =

Gerard Weber may refer to:

- Gerard Weber (footballer, born 1938), Dutch footballer for Excelsior and football manager
- Gerard Weber (footballer, born 1941), Dutch footballer for BVV, DOS, PSV, and EVV
- Gérard Weber (1948–2016), French politician
