= Peter Rona =

Peter Rona may refer to:

- Peter Rona (physician) (1871–1945), Hungarian German Jewish physician and physiologist
- Peter A. Rona (1934–2014), American oceanographer
- Péter Róna (born 1942), Hungarian economist and lawyer
