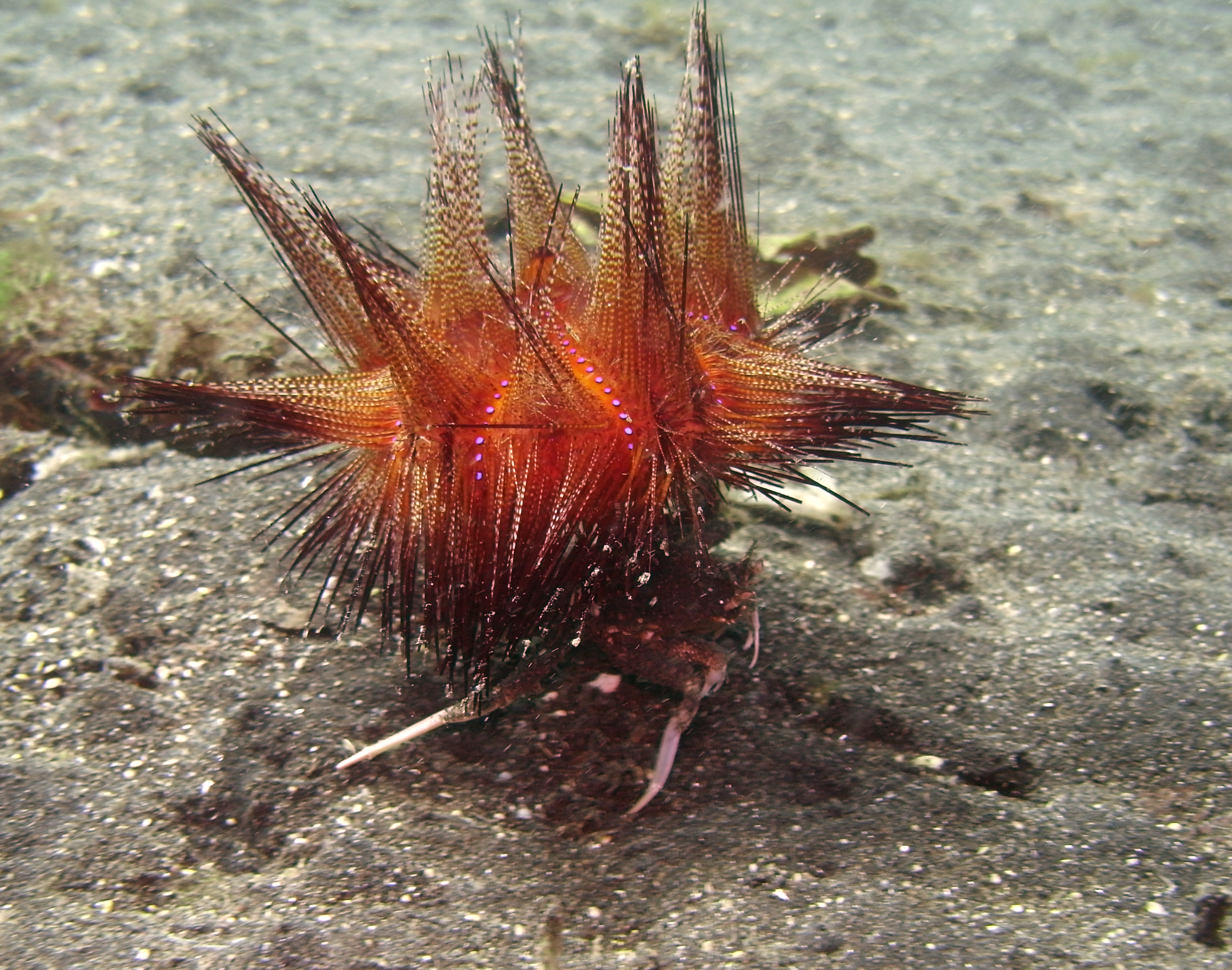
- Dorippe frascone carrying a red radiant sea urchin (Astropyga radiata)

Scientific classification
- Kingdom: Animalia
- Phylum: Arthropoda
- Class: Malacostraca
- Order: Decapoda
- Suborder: Pleocyemata
- Infraorder: Brachyura
- Family: Dorippidae
- Genus: Dorippe
- Species: D. frascone

Binomial name
- Dorippe frascone (Herbst, 1785)

Synonyms
- Cancer frascone Herbst, 1785; Cancer nodulosus Olivier, 1791

= Dorippe frascone =

Species of crab

Dorippe frascone, the urchin crab or carrier crab, is a small species of crab in the family Dorippidae that was first described scientifically by J.F.W. Herbst, in 1785. It is found in the Red Sea and parts of the western and eastern Indian Ocean. It often has a symbiotic relationship with a long-spined sea urchin and carries one around on its carapace.

== Description ==
The urchin crab is a brownish-pink colour and grows to a length of about 5 cm (2 in). It has long-stalked eyes, a rounded carapace and long, slender legs. It uses only the first two pairs of legs for locomotion because the third and fourth pairs are used to grip a sea urchin which it carries around on its back. It is similar in morphology to the jellyfish crab (Ethusa spp.) but is easily distinguished by the different invertebrate transported. It also resembles decorator crabs but those actually stick living creatures such as sponges, hydroids and bryozoans, bits of algae and inert objects to their shells.

== Distribution ==
Dorippe frascone is found in the Red Sea and off the coast of East Africa, including Mozambique and Cargados Carajos, an atoll north east of Mauritius.

== Ecology ==
The urchin crab is so called because of its habit of carrying a sea urchin on its carapace. This is usually the red urchin (Astropyga radiata), the black long-spined urchin (Diadema setosum) or the banded diadem urchin (Diadema savignyi). All these urchins have long, hollow spines and may provide protection to the crab by reducing the risk of predation by fish while not being too heavy to carry. The urchin obtains benefit by being transported to new feeding grounds. Even large and mobile individuals submit passively to being carried in this way.
