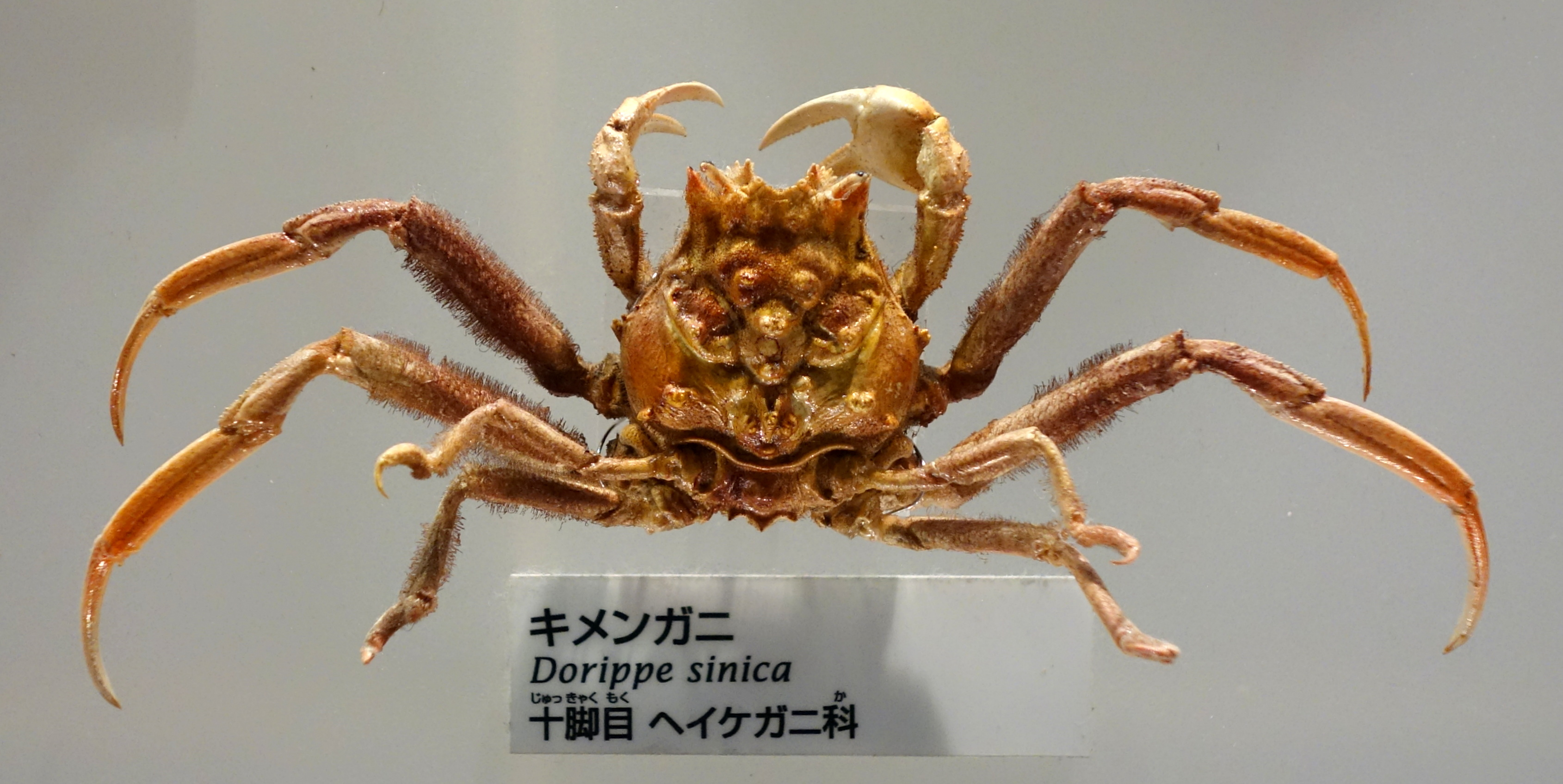
- Dorippe sinica

Scientific classification
- Kingdom: Animalia
- Phylum: Arthropoda
- Clade: Pancrustacea
- Class: Malacostraca
- Order: Decapoda
- Suborder: Pleocyemata
- Infraorder: Brachyura
- Family: Dorippidae
- Genus: Dorippe; Weber, 1795

= Dorippe (crab) =

Genus of crabs

Dorippe is a genus of crabs containing seven species, originally described by Weber in 1795.

== Species ==
The genus Dorippe includes:

- Dorippe frascone (Herbst, 1785)
- Dorippe glabra Manning, 1993
- Dorippe irrorata Manning & Holthuis, 1986
- Dorippe quadridens (Fabricius, 1793)
- Dorippe sinica Chen, 1980
- Dorippe tenuipes Chen, 1980
- Dorippe trilobata Manning, 1993
