= Ann Weber (disambiguation) =

Ann or Anne Weber may refer to:

- Ann Weber Hoyt (1922–2008), American archer
- Ann E. Weber, American chemist
- Anne Weber (born 1964), German-French author, translator and self-translator
