= Heinrich Burkhardt =

German mathematician (1861–1914)

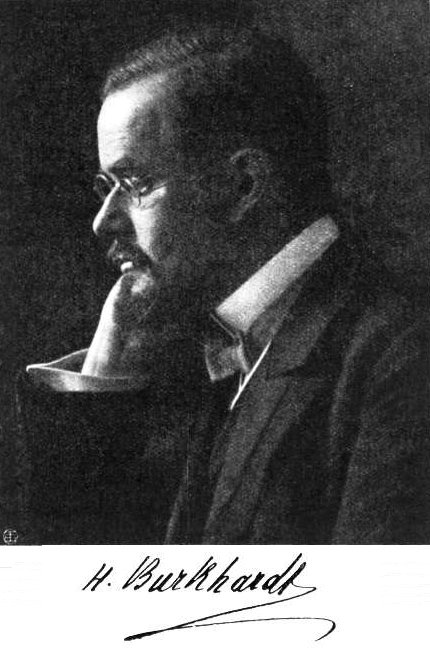
- Heinrich Burkhardt
- Born: 15 October 1861; Schweinfurt, Kingdom of Bavaria
- Died: 2 November 1914 (aged 53); Munich, German Empire
- Education: Technische Hochschule München (1879–81); Friedrich Wilhelm University of Berlin (1881–82); Ludwig-Maximilians-Universität München (1882–83, 1885–86); University of Göttingen (1883–84)
- Known for: Burkhardt quartic Burkhardt group
- Scientific career
- Fields: Mathematics
- Doctoral advisor: Gustav Conrad Bauer

Heinrich Friedrich Karl Ludwig Burkhardt (15 October 1861 – 2 November 1914) was a German mathematician. He famously was one of the two examiners of Albert Einstein's PhD thesis Eine neue Bestimmung der Moleküldimensionen. Of Einstein's thesis he stated: "The mode of treatment demonstrates fundamental mastery of the relevant mathematical methods" and "What I checked, I found to be correct without exception."

== Biography ==
Burkhardt was born in Schweinfurt. Starting from 1879 he studied under Karl Weierstrass, Alexander von Brill, and Hermann Amandus Schwarz at the Ludwig-Maximilians-Universität München, at the Technische Hochschule München, at the Friedrich Wilhelm University of Berlin, and at the University of Göttingen. He attained a doctorate in 1886 at the Ludwig-Maximilians-Universität München under Gustav Conrad Bauer with a thesis entitled: Beziehungen zwischen der Invariantentheorie und der Theorie algebraischer Integrale und ihrer Umkehrungen (Relations between the invariant theory and the theory of algebraic integrals and their inverses).

In 1887, he was an assistant at the University of Göttingen and obtained his habilitation there in 1889. Later, he was a professor at the University of Zurich from 1897 to 1908 and the Ludwig-Maximilians-Universität München from October 1908. He worked on the theory of the elliptical functions, series expansions, group theory, the Burkhardt quartic, and history of mathematics.

He died in Neuwittelsbach/München, of a disease of the stomach, diagnosed around Easter 1914.

== Works ==
- 1899: Elliptische Funktionen, zweiter Tiel, from Internet Archive
- 1903: Algebraische Analysis, from Internet Archive
- 1908: Entwicklungen nach oscillierenden Funktionen und Integration der Differentialgleichungen der mathematischen physick
- 1913: Theory of Functions of a Complex Variable, translated by S.E. Rasor, link from Internet Archive

== See also ==
- Alfred Kleiner
