= Quartic threefold =

In algebraic geometry, a quartic threefold is a degree 4 hypersurface of dimension 3 in 4-dimensional projective space. Iskovskih & Manin (1971) showed that all non-singular quartic threefolds are irrational, though some of them are unirational.

== Examples ==
- Burkhardt quartic
- Igusa quartic
