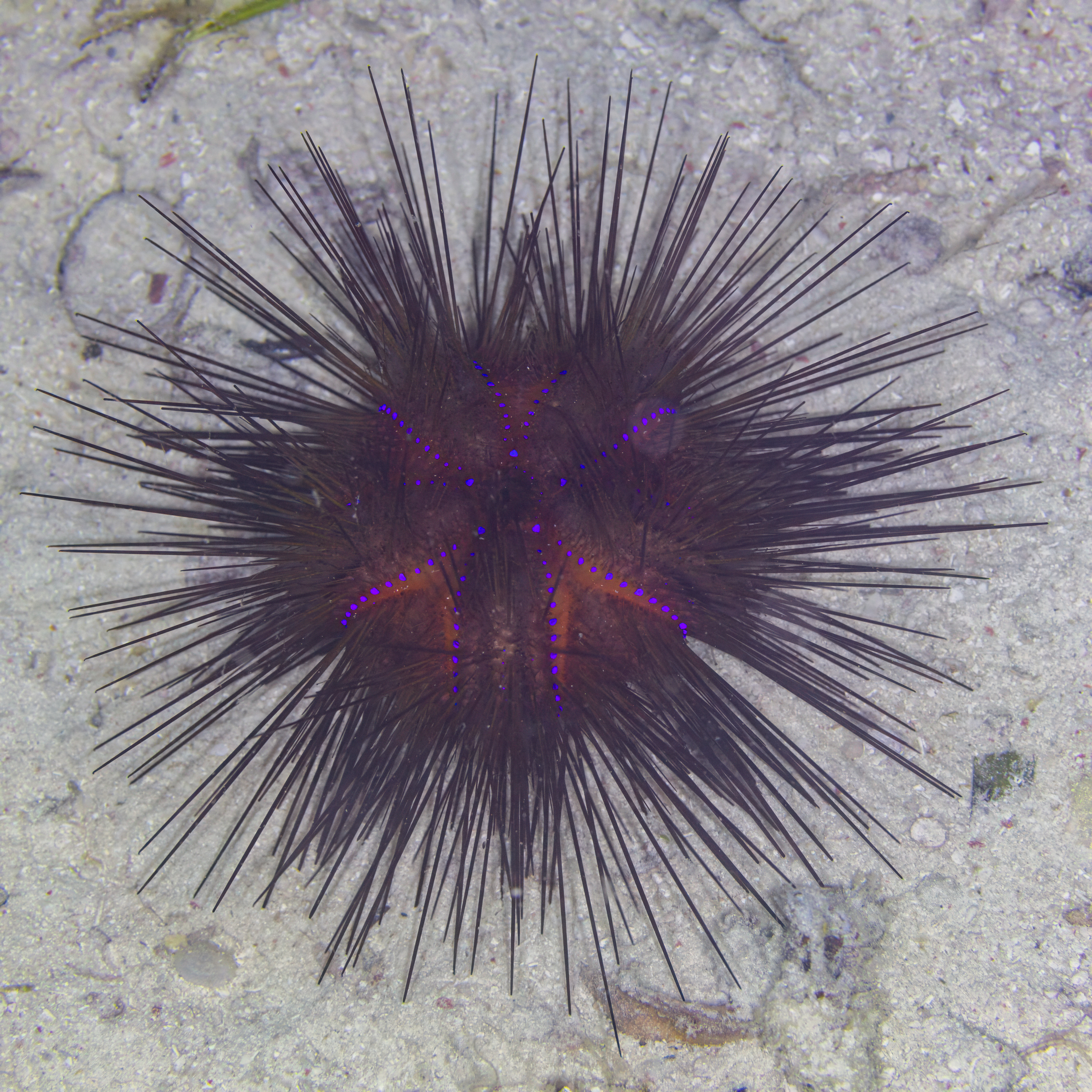
- A group of Astropyga radiata seen in Kenya

Scientific classification
- Kingdom: Animalia
- Phylum: Echinodermata
- Class: Echinoidea
- Order: Diadematoida
- Family: Diadematidae
- Genus: Astropyga
- Species: A. radiata

Binomial name
- Astropyga radiata (Leske, 1778)

Synonyms
- Asteropyga radiata; Astropyga elastica Bell, 1876; Astropyga freudenbergi Sarasin, 1887; Astropyga major (Seba, 1734); Astropyga mossambica Peters, 1853; Cidaris radiata Leske, 1778; Cidarites radiata (Leske, 1778); Diadema radiatum (Leske, 1778); Echinonanthus major Seba, 1734; Echinus radiatus (Leske, 1778)

= Astropyga radiata =

Red urchin

Species of sea urchin

Astropyga radiata, the red urchin, fire urchin, false fire urchin or blue-spotted urchin, is a species of sea urchin in the family Diadematidae. It is a large species with long spines and is found in the tropical Indo-Pacific region. It was first described in 1778 by the German naturalist Nathaniel Gottfried Leske.

== Description ==
Astropyga radiata is a large urchin with a test diameter of up to 20 cm (8 in), flattened or slightly concave on the aboral (upper) side. The spines are up to 4 cm (1.6 in) long and are grouped in five vertical clusters in between which are V-shaped areas with no spines corresponding to the interambulacral plates. These bare areas are red with lines of iridescent blue dots while the colour of the rest of the test and spines varies from reddish brown to purple, dark brown or nearly black. The spines are long and hollow; they are of two kinds, the shorter being venomous. The anal sac is prominent, brown with a dark tip. Juveniles have spines with transverse banding and this characteristic sometimes persists into adulthood.

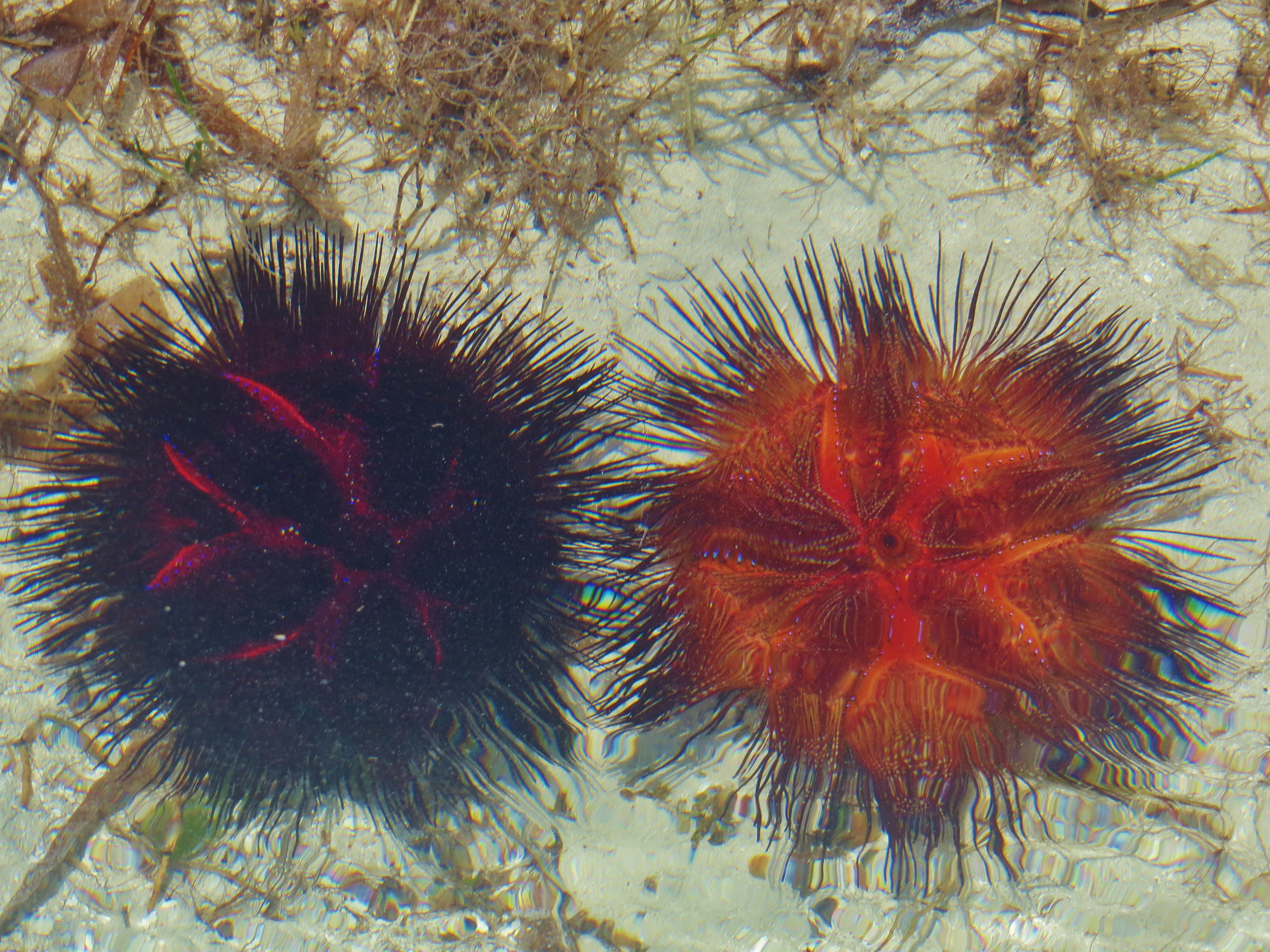
Black and orange specimens seen in Kenya

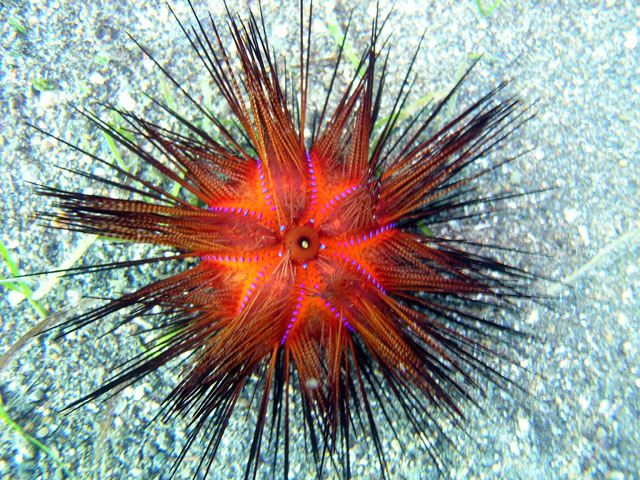
An orange specimen in the Philippines

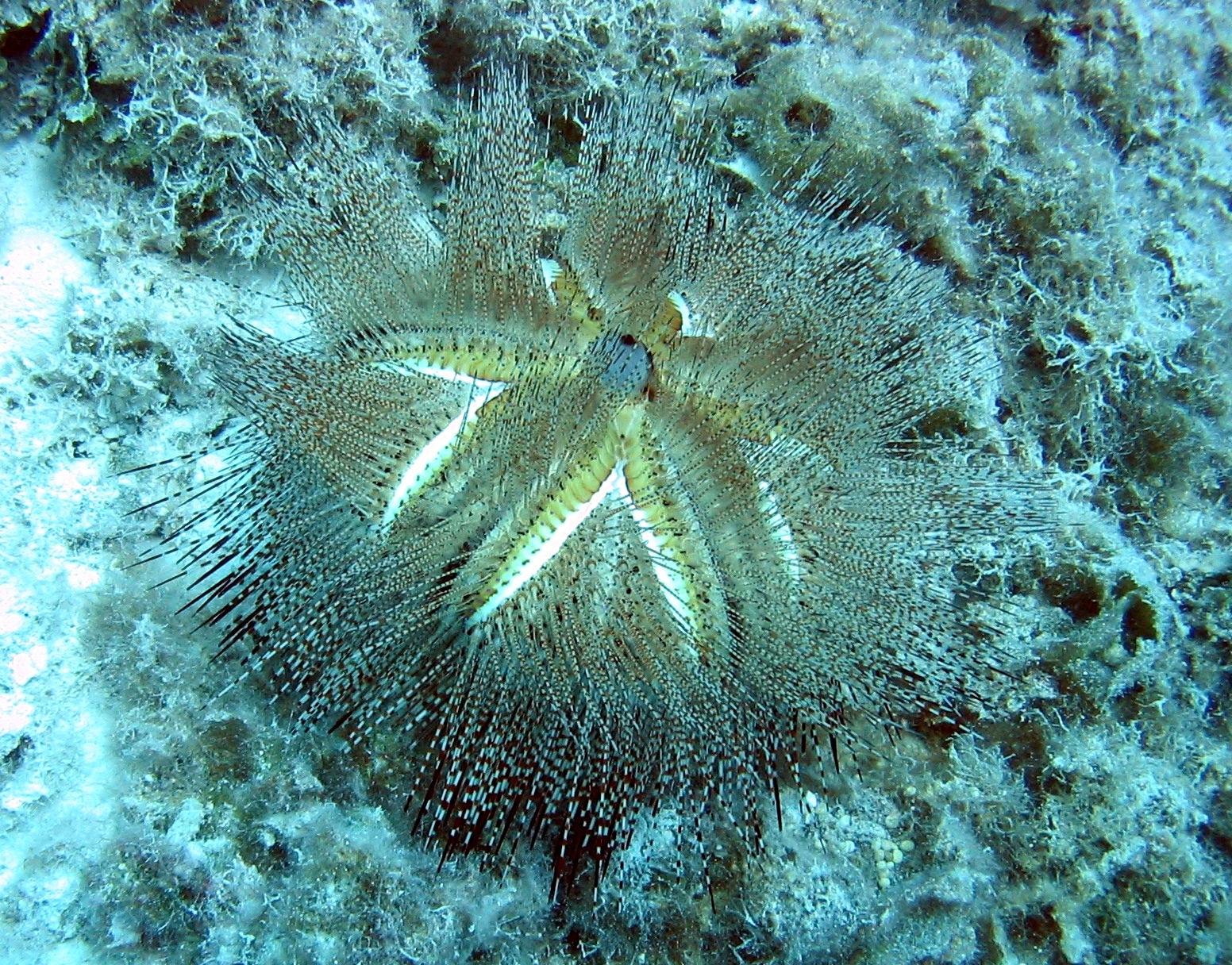
A rare, white specimen in Hawaii
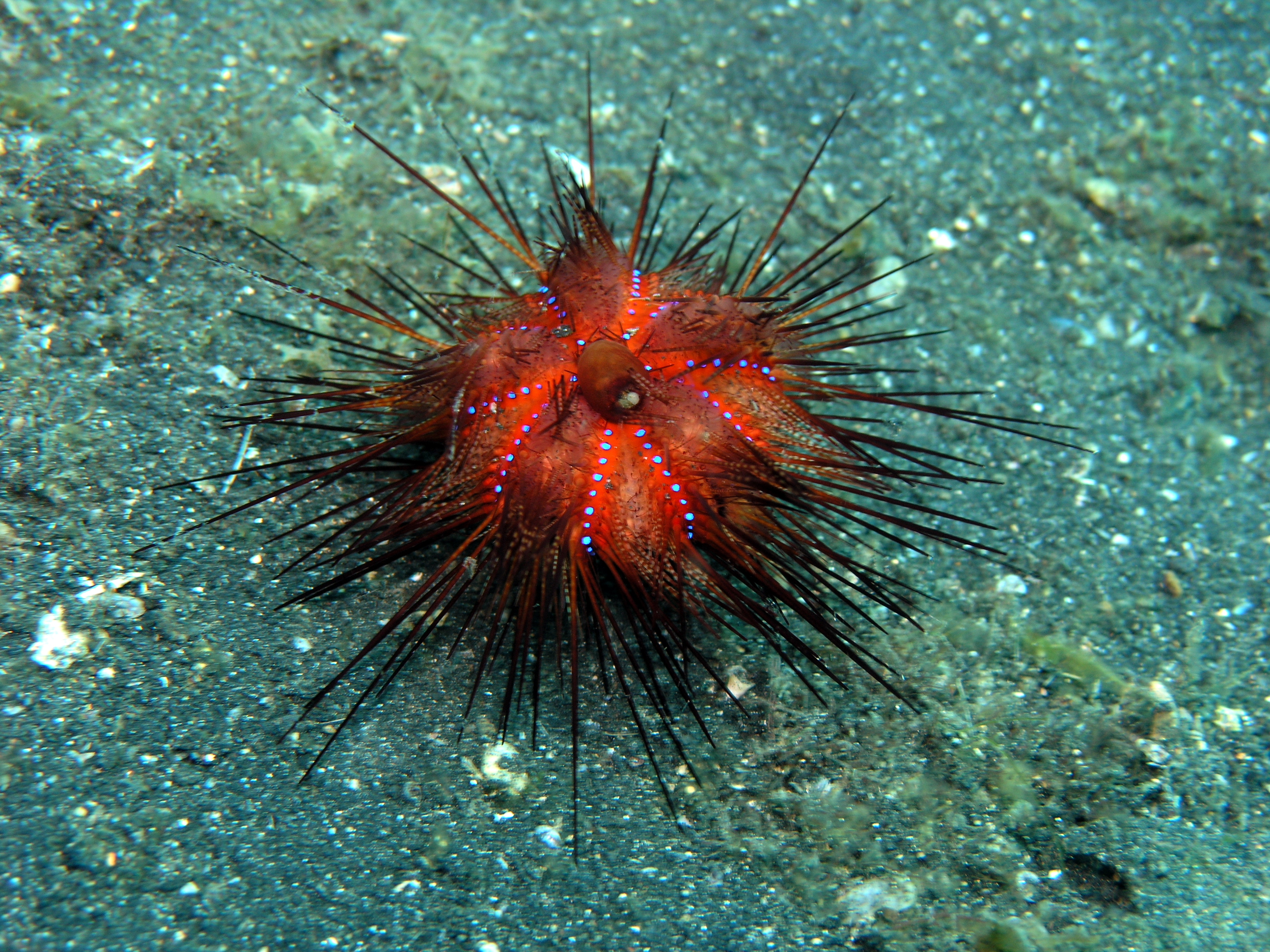
Young in Indonesia

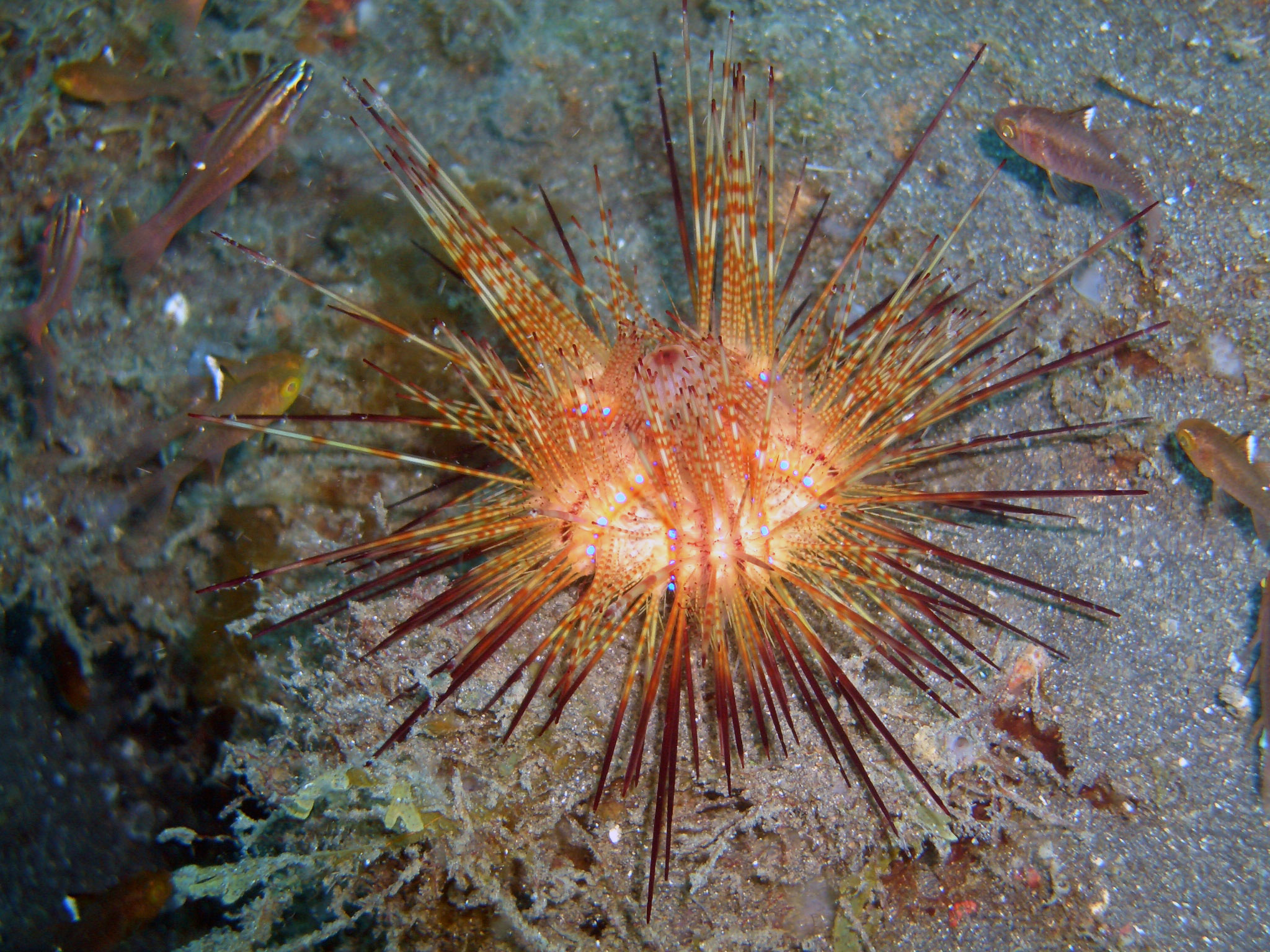
Lighter young

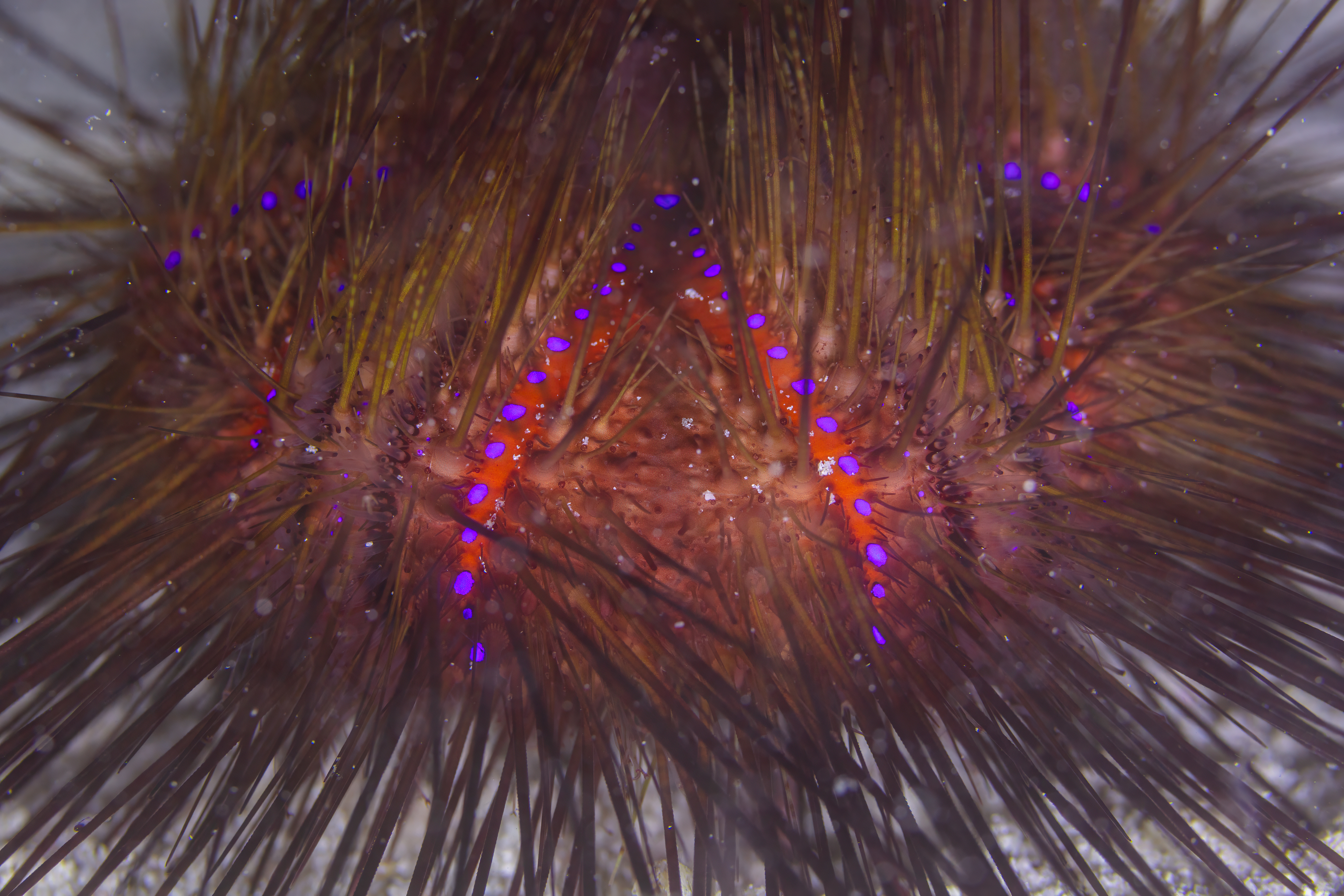
Detail view

== Distribution and habitat ==
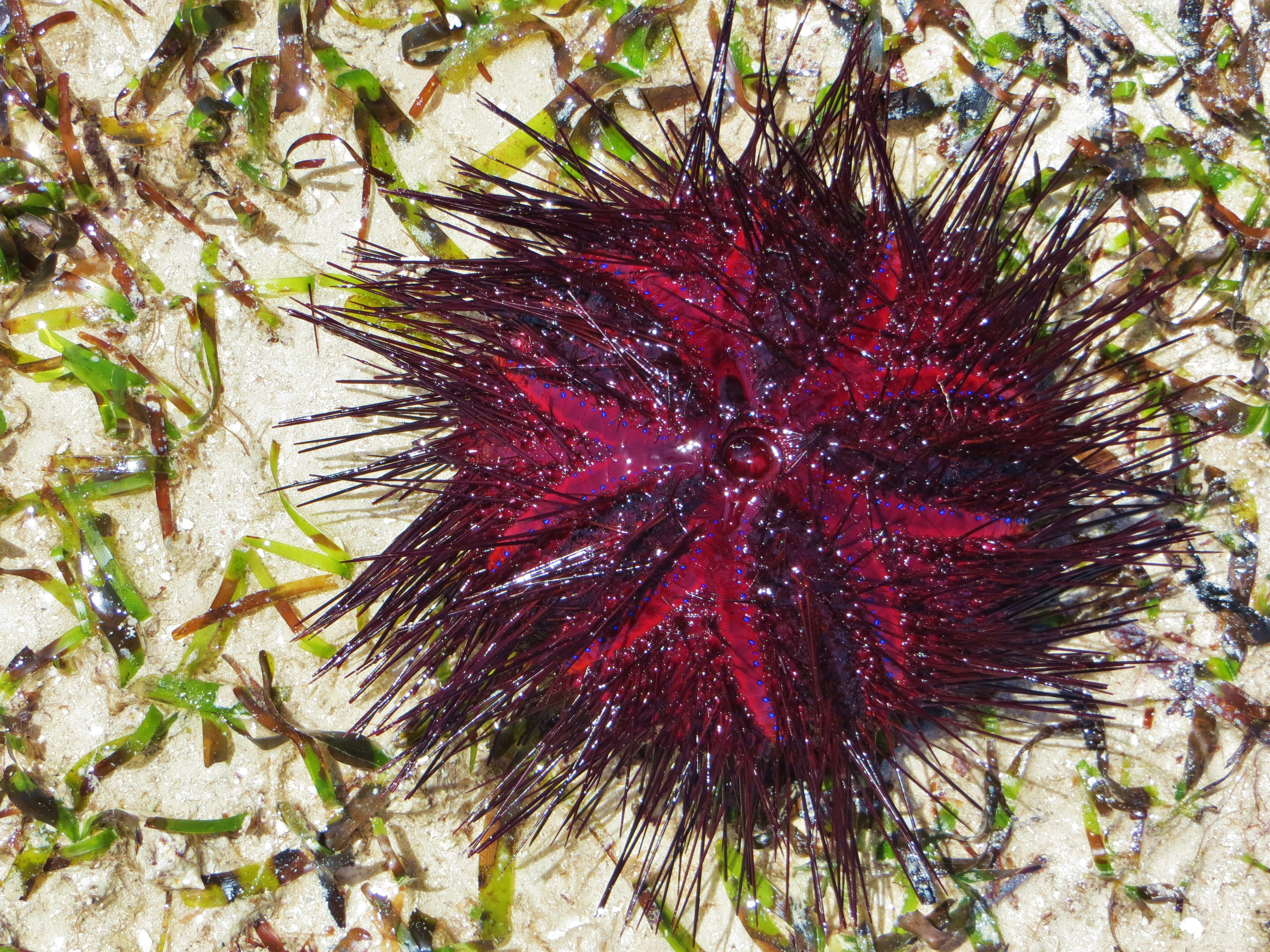
A red sea urchin, emerged during low tide in Kenya. This species can live in very shallow waters, at the risk of dying from tidal drought.

Astropyga radiata is found in the Indo-Pacific Ocean at a maximum depth of about 70 metres (230 ft) but more normally at 10 to 30 metres (33 to 98 ft). Its range extends from the African coast to Hawaii and Australian waters. It is often found in lagoons and bays where the substrate is sand, shingle or coral rubble. Sometimes many urchins collect together in one locality in dense aggregations.

== Biology ==
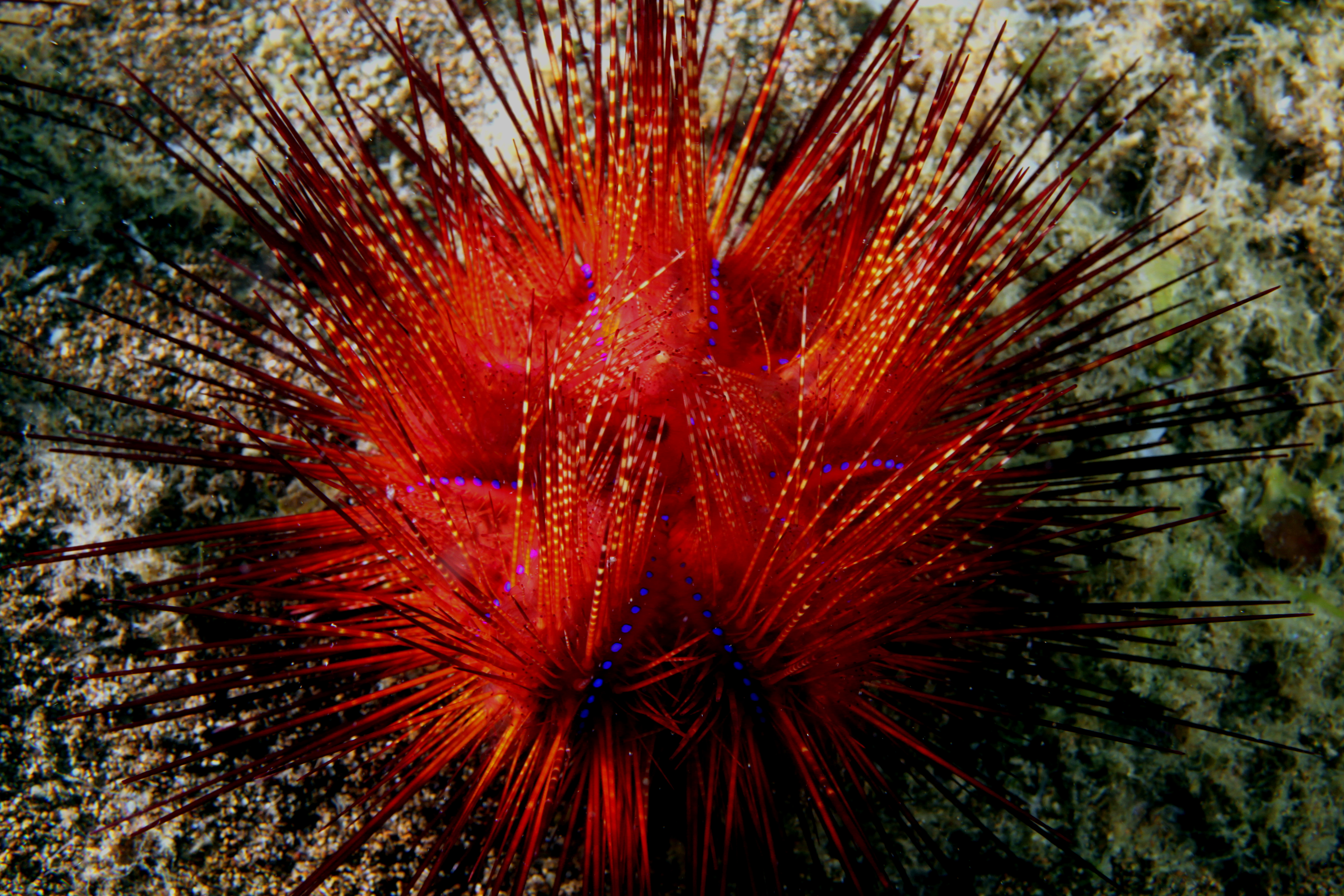
An A. radiata in Philippines

Astropyga radiata is mostly nocturnal and feeds by grazing on algae. The mouth is at the centre of the oral (under) surface where there are five powerful teeth in an arrangement known as an Aristotle's lantern. This urchin is light sensitive and can angle its spines towards an approaching threatening object.

The sexes are separate in Astropyga radiata. Eggs and sperm are liberated into the water column. After fertilisation, the larvae are planktonic and develop through several stages before settling on the seabed and undergoing metamorphosis into a juvenile urchin.

== Ecology ==
A number of crustaceans and fish live in association with this urchin. These include the commensal shrimps Periclimenes hirsutus and Stegopontonia commensalis and the crab Zebrida adamsii. Another crab, Dorippe frascone is a symbiont and carries the urchin on its back. Certain juvenile fish also live among the spines including young emperor red snappers (Lutjanus sebae), cardinal fish (Apogonidae) and the zebra lionfish.

== Relations to humans ==
Although not deadly to humans, these urchin's quills are quite venomous; capable of inflicting painful wounds. Its overall pain scale rating, according to the "Kings of Pain" pain index is a 12 out of 30. However, being a rather large and brightly colored species of urchin, it is relatively visible to divers, making injuries by accidentally stepping on one comparatively rare. Due to its beauty, it is loved by underwater photographers and some expert fish-keepers.

=== Etymology ===
"Astropyga" comes from ancient Greek, astro meaning "star" and pyga "anus". Hence, it is named because of its star-shaped anus (or more precisely the star-shaped pattern around its anus).
"Radiata" comes from Latin and means "radiant", because of its colors and spines.
In English, it is also called star urchin, blue-spotted urchin, red sea urchin, or false fire urchin (different from the "true" fire urchin, Asthenosoma varium).
It goes by the name of Roter (Diadem)Seeigel in German, Riccio rosso in Italian, Falso erizo de fuego in Spanish, and Oursin rouge in French.
