= Arthur Weber =

Arthur Weber may refer to:

- Arthur E. Weber (1879–1975), German cardiologist
- Arthur L. Weber, American chemist
- Arthur Weber (tennis) (born 1992), French tennis player
