= Friedrich Weber =

Friedrich Weber may refer to:

- Friedrich Weber (veterinarian) (1892–1954), German veterinarian; a principal conspirator in the Beer Hall Putsch
- Friedrich Weber (entomologist) (1781–1823), German entomologist and botanist
- Friedrich Weber (general) (1892–1972), German general
- Friedrich Wilhelm Weber (1813–1894), German doctor, politician and poet
- Friedrich Christian Weber, 18th-century German diplomat and writer
- Friedrich Dionys Weber (1766–1842), Bohemian composer
- Friedrich Weber (musician) (1819–1909), German organist and composer

== See also ==
- Weber
