= Max Weber (disambiguation) =

Max Weber (1864–1920) was a German political economist and sociologist.

Max Weber may also refer to:

- Max Weber Sr. (1836–1897), German politician and father of Max Weber (1864–1920)
- Max Weber (Swiss politician) (1897–1974), Swiss politician, member of the Swiss Federal Council (1951–1954)
- Max Weber (general) (1824–1901), German revolutionary and Brigadier General of the Union army during the American Civil War
- Max Carl Wilhelm Weber (1852–1937), Dutch zoologist and museum director at the University of Amsterdam
- Max Weber (artist) (1881–1961), American cubist painter
- Max Weber (racewalker) (1922–2007), German athlete
- Max Maria von Weber (1822–1881), German civil engineer
