= Marc Weber =

Marc Weber may refer to:

- Marc Weber (ice hockey) (born 1973), Swiss professional ice hockey centre
- Marc Weber (rower, born 1972), German rower
- Marc Weber (rower, born 1997), German rower

== See also ==
- Mark Webber (disambiguation)
