= Charles Webber =

Charles Webber may refer to:

- Charles Edmund Webber (1838–1904), British soldier, engineer and author
- Charles Wilkins Webber (1819–1856), American journalist and explorer
- Charles Webber (priest) (1762–1848), English priest, archdeacon of Chichester
- Charles Webber (Royal Navy officer) (1722–1783), British naval commander
- Charles T. Webber (1825–1911), American painter
- Charles Webber, one of the candidates of the Australian federal election, 1949

== See also ==
- Charles Weber (disambiguation)
