= Benjamin Webber =

Ben(jamin) Webber may refer to:

- Benjamin D. Webber, List of mayors of Beverly, Massachusetts
- Ben Webber, character in There Should Have Been Castles

== See also ==
- Ben Weber (disambiguation)
