= Karl Ritter von Weber =

German officer

Karl Weber, from 1917 Ritter von Weber (23 August 1892 in Geiselbach – 20 July 1941 near Smolensk) was a German officer, Major General and Commander of the 17th Panzer-Division of the German Army in World War II.

He joined the army in 1911. During the First World War he saw action during the border battles on the Western Front. He remained there during the rest of the war, and was promoted to first lieutenant on 17 January 1917, and was twice wounded in 1918 during the battles at Artois. He was decorated for his exceptional military merits, receiving on 9 October 1917 the Knight's cross of the Military Order of Max Joseph thereafter entitled to the title Ritter von Weber (personal nobility). Von Weber's bravery was commended in the diploma accompanying his knighthood: "in the battle of Ypres, in the action at North Poelkapelle on 9 October 1917 when forces were disorganized, [Weber], understanding the urgency of the situation and under most difficult conditions, took command, leading his men in an overwhelming attack on the enemy. [Weber] displayed zeal and great personal valor in carrying out a successful attack."

After the war von Weber was drafted into the Reichswehr, where he was first used in an infantry regiment and commanded in 1921 the Prussian Motor Vehicles Department in Berlin. He was promoted to captain on 1 February 1923, and on 21 March 1927 he was transferred to the (Bavarian) 20th Infantry Regiment. On 1 March 1930 was posted to the Reich Defence Ministry in Berlin, moving on 1 April 1930 to the local army Weapons Office. Subsequently, Weber received the promotion to major on 1 February 1932, on 1 August 1934 to Lieutenant Colonel and on 1 January 1937, to the rank of Colonel.

After the start of the Second World War, von Weber fought as a Regimental Commander in the Western campaign against Poland. On 1 November 1940 Karl Ritter von Weber was promoted to major General, taking over the 17th Rifle Brigade on 1 December 1940, which he commanded until 28 June 1941. Thereafter he was briefly transferred to the Führerreserve and entrusted with the leadership of the 17th Panzer Division on 7 July 1941. During the battle of Smolensk, he suffered a severe wound and died later in the hospital.

On his father's side, he was cousin to the Bavarian noble family Ritter von Weber.

== Decorations ==
- Iron Cross (1914) II. class, later promoted to I. class
- Knight's cross of the Military Order of Max Joseph (1917)

== Sources ==
- Rudolf von Kramer, Otto von Waldenfels: VIRTUTI PRO PATRIA. Der königlich bayerische Militär-Max-Joseph-Orden. Kriegstaten und Ehrenbuch 1914–1918. Selbstverlag des königlich bayerischen Militär-Max-Joseph-Ordens. München 1966. S. 427.
