= Hans Weber (disambiguation) =

Hans Weber (1934–1965) was a Swiss football midfielder.

Hans Weber may refer to:

- Hans Hermann Weber (1896–1974), German physiologist and biochemist
- Hans-Jürgen Weber (born 1955), German football referee
