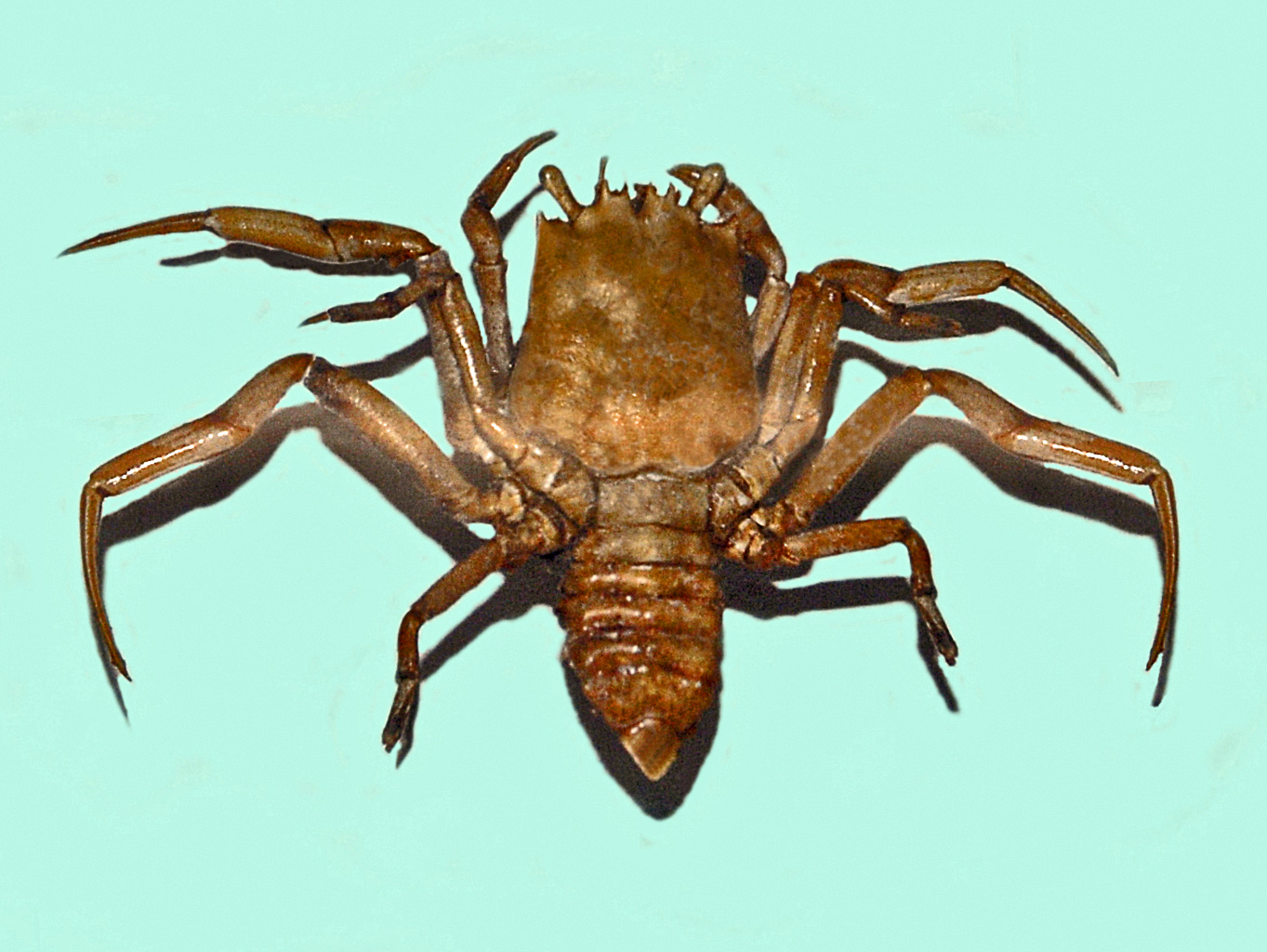
- Ethusa mascarone. Museum specimen

Scientific classification
- Kingdom: Animalia
- Phylum: Arthropoda
- Class: Malacostraca
- Order: Decapoda
- Suborder: Pleocyemata
- Infraorder: Brachyura
- Family: Ethusidae
- Genus: Ethusa
- Species: E. mascarone

Binomial name
- Ethusa mascarone (Herbst, 1785)

Synonyms
- Aethusa makarone Guérin, 1832; Cancer mascarone Herbst, 1785; Dorippe mascaronius Risso, 1816

= Ethusa mascarone =

Species of crab

Ethusa mascarone is a species of crabs in the family Ethusidae.

== Description ==
The cephalothorax of Ethusa mascarone is almost rectangular, it can reach a length of 15 millimetres (0.59 in) and a width of 13 millimetres (0.51 in). The body color is gray-brown, with brown lines on the carapace and transverse striae on the abdomen. Chelipeds and legs are lighter and white speckled.

The front pairs of legs are long, but the hind legs are shorter and are used to carry on the back a variety of objects and organisms, especially valves of bivalves, by which these crabs camouflage and protect themselves. It has been described as a decorator crab despite not belonging to the superfamily Majoidea.

They mainly feed on small organisms and decaying flesh of dead animals.

== Distribution ==
This species is present in the Mediterranean Sea.

== Habitat ==
These crabs live on sandy substrate and muddy bottom, from a few meters up to 75 m deep.

== Behavior ==
Under hypoxic conditions, Ethusa mascarone has been observed to discard its objects of camouflage "to either increase mobility and/or reduce oxygen demand".
