= Nancy Thornberry =

American biochemist

Nancy Ann Thornberry
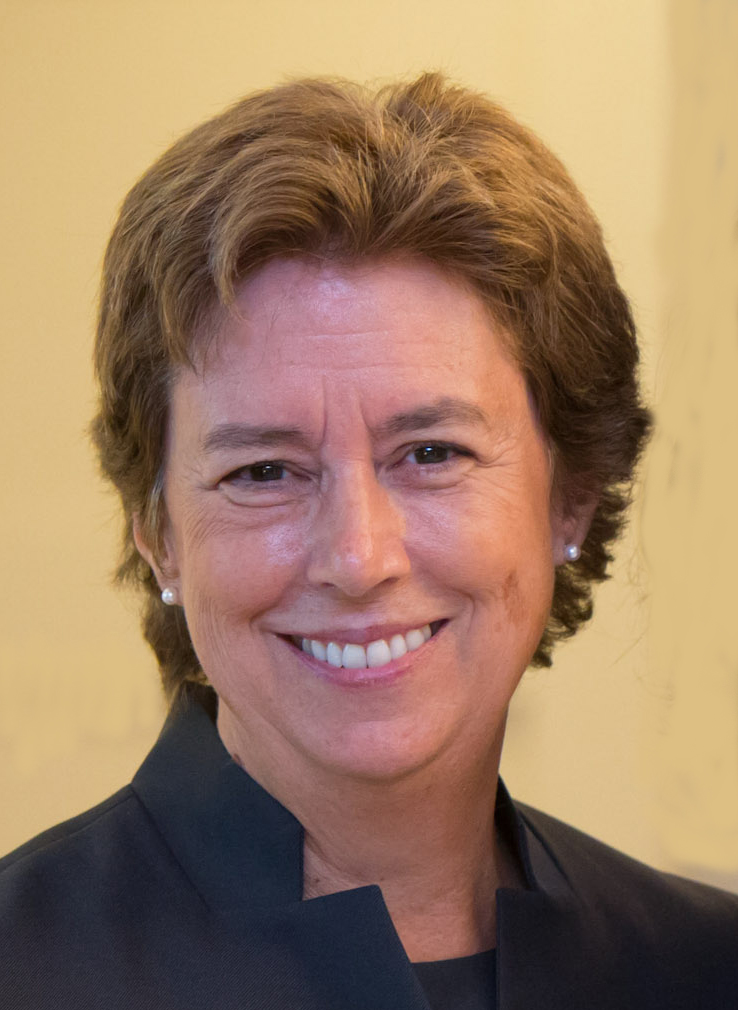
- Nancy Thornberry, 2017
- Education: Muhlenberg College
- Awards: 2011 PhRMA Discoverer’s Award
- Scientific career
- Fields: Metabolic disorders, Drug discovery
- Workplaces: Kallyope Inc., Merck Research Laboratories

Nancy A. Thornberry is the founding CEO and current chair, R&D at Kallyope Inc. in New York City. She previously worked with Merck Research Laboratories (MRL), joining the company in 1979 as a biochemist and retiring from the position of senior vice president and franchise head, diabetes and endocrinology in 2013.

In 1992, Thornberry identified the first caspase, Caspase-1/Interleukin-1 converting enzyme (ICE). In 1999, Thornberry initiated Merck's research into dipeptidyl peptidase-4, leading to the development of FDA-approved treatments for Type 2 diabetes. She has received a number of awards, including the 2011 PhRMA Discoverer’s Award.

== Education ==
Thornberry grew up in South Bend, Indiana. As of 1979, she earned a B.Sc. in Natural Science from Muhlenberg College in Allentown, Pennsylvania.

== Career ==
Thornberry joined Merck Research Laboratories (MRL) in Rahway, New Jersey, as a biochemist in 1979. In 1999 she was appointed the director of enzymology, and in 2001 the director of metabolic disorders, with further promotions in 2007, 2009 and 2011.

At her retirement from Merck in 2013 Thornberry held the position of senior vice president and franchise head, diabetes and endocrinology.[2]

While an independent consultant to the biotechnology and pharmaceutical industries, Thornberry joined the boards of directors of Intarcia Therapeutics and Abide Therapeutics She subsequently joined the boards of directors of Schrodinger Therapeutics in 2019 and Denali Therapeutics in 2021.

As of November 1, 2015, Thornberry became CEO of Kallyope Inc. in New York City. In October, 2021, Thornberry assumed the post of Chair, R&D while also maintaining her seat on the company’s Board of Directors (succeeded by colleague from Merck, Jay Galeota, who became CEO of Kallyope.) In 2022, she joined the board of the New York Genome Center.

== Research ==
Thornberry's research areas include obesity, diabetes and protease biology. Her work has led to the development of drug candidates including FDA-approved treatments for Type 2 diabetes.

Thornberry was involved in early enzymology research on Lisinopril, an angiotensin converting enzyme (ACE) inhibitor used for the treatment of hypertension. Thornberry also helped to identify Niemann-Pick C1-Like 1 (NPC1L1) as the target of ezetimibe, an inhibitor of cholesterol absorption.

In 1992, her work on proteases led to the identification of the first caspase, caspase-1/Interleukin-1 converting enzyme (ICE). She determined that ICE was the cysteine protease responsible for IL-1β processing in monocytes. Thornberry also developed a novel method for analyzing protease specificities in combinatorial libraries of positional scanning substrates. Her work has led to the broader study of proteases in apoptosis.

External videos
- “PhRMA11 Discoverers Award Winner 2011”, PhRMAPress
- “Bench to bedside -- discovery of JANUVIA (Sitagliptin)”, Ann Weber & Nancy Thornberry, TEDxNJIT

Beginning in 1999, Thornberry led the biology team for the development of Januvia™ (generic: sitagliptin), a once-a-day oral medication that inhibits the dipeptidyl peptidase-4 (DPP-4) enzyme and improves glucose tolerance to treat Type 2 diabetes. Ann E. Weber led the corresponding chemistry team for the project. The drug was approved by the FDA in October 2006. Janumet™, a drug combining sitagliptin and metformin was also approved, in April 2007. In 2007, the research team at Merck received the Prix Galien USA award for their work on Januvia™. The Januvia™ project was the first project at Merck to be co-led solely by women and the first project co-led solely by women to win the Discoverers Award.

"Discovering an important new medicine is the goal of every person who works in pharmaceutical research. Until it actually happens, though, there is no way to know how absolutely thrilling it is, and how incredibly and deeply satisfying it feels."

At Kallyope Inc., drug discovery focuses on the study of hormonal and neural communication between the gut and the brain to better understand and improve health and nutrition. Kallyope currently has two programs in clinical trials, one targeting metabolic circuits for diabetes and obesity, while the other targets gut barrier function with potential relevance for inflammatory bowel disease and several other diseases. The company also has programs aimed at gastrointestinal, CNS and inflammatory disorders.

Thornberry also serves on the Boards of Directors of Kallyope Inc, Schrodinger Therapeutics, which employs computational biology for the identification of small molecules therapeutics, and Denali Therapeutics, a biotechnology company focused on neurodegeneration. She is also on the board of the New York Genome Center, and a member of the NYC Mayor’s Life Science Advisory Council.

== Awards ==
- 2013, Women in STEM honoree, Liberty Science Center (LSC)
- 2011, Discoverer’s Award, Pharmaceutical Research and Manufacturers of America (PhRMA), with Ann E. Weber, for work which "has been of special benefit to humankind".
- 2011, Thomas Alva Edison Patent Award, Research and Development Council of New Jersey
- 2010, Heroes of Chemistry Award (ACS) with Ann E. Weber and Joseph Armstrong
- 2008, Alumni Lifetime Achievement Award, Muhlenberg College
- 2007, Prix Galien USA award to the Merck research team for Januvia™
- 2007, Merck Directors Award for work on Januvia™
- Merck Presidential Fellowship
