= Mark Webber =

Mark Webber may refer to:

- Mark Webber (racing driver) (born 1976), Australian racing driver
- Mark Webber (actor) (born 1980), American actor
- Mark Webber (guitarist) (born 1970), English guitarist with the band Pulp
- Mark Webber (political scientist) (born 1964), British political scientist

== See also ==
- Marc Weber (disambiguation)
