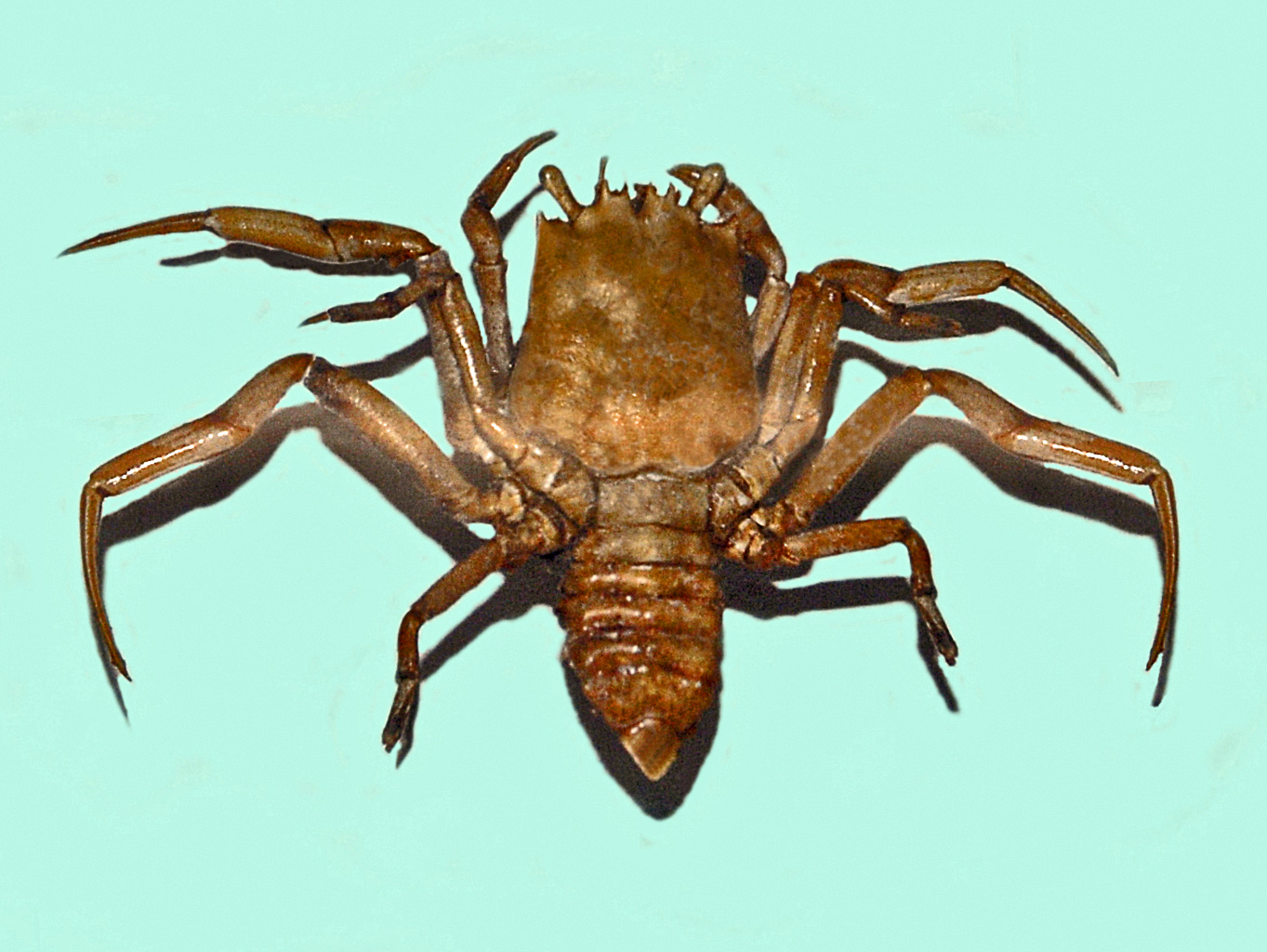
- Ethusa mascarone

Scientific classification
- Kingdom: Animalia
- Phylum: Arthropoda
- Class: Malacostraca
- Order: Decapoda
- Suborder: Pleocyemata
- Infraorder: Brachyura
- Superfamily: Dorippoidea
- Family: Ethusidae; Guinot, 1977

Genera
- 4, See below.

= Ethusidae =

Family of crabs

Ethusidae is one of two extant families of crabs in the superfamily Dorippoidea. It contains four genera. Members of this family are found in marine environments at depths from 16m to 4,192m.

== Genera ==
- Ethusa Roux, 1830
- Ethusina Smith, 1884
- Parethusa Chen, 1997
- Serpenthusa Naruse, Castro & Ng, 2009
