= Gustav Conrad Bauer =

German mathematician (1820–1906)

Gustav Conrad Bauer (18 November 1820, Augsburg – 3 April 1906, Munich) was a German mathematician, known for the Bauer-Muir transformation and Bauer's conic sections. He earned a footnote in the history of science as the doctoral advisor (Doktorvater) of Heinrich Burkhardt, who became one of the two referees of Albert Einstein's doctoral dissertation.

== Education and family ==
Gustav Bauer passed in 1837 his Abitur at Augsburg's Gymnasium bei St. Anna. He continued his studies of mathematics at the Polytechnischen Schule Augsburg and also the universities of Erlangen, Vienna and Berlin. At Humboldt University in Berlin, Bauer received in 1842 his Promotierung under Peter Gustav Lejeune Dirichlet. From 1842 Gustav Bauer continued his studies in Paris under Joseph Liouville, as well as other mathematicians.

In 1862 Gustav Bauer married Amalie, daughter of the Archivrat and Professor Honorarius Nathanael von Schlichtegroll. The marriage produced two daughters and a son Gustav junior, who became a well-known engineer.

== Professional career ==
At the beginning of his professional employment, Bauer applied for a civil service position as a schoolteacher but became a private tutor from 1845 to 1853 in the royal house of Prince Mihail Sturdza and his successor Prince Grigore Alexandru Ghica in what is now Rumania. In 1857 Bauer spent three months in England and upon his return to Germany became a Privatdozent for the Mathematics Faculty of the Ludwig-Maximilians-Universität München. There he received his Habilitation and became in 1865 professor extraordinarius, in 1869 professor ordinarius, and in 1900 professor emeritus.

Bauer's mathematical research dealt with algebra, geometric problems, spherical harmonics, the gamma function, and generalized continued fractions. In 1871 Bauer was elected a full member of the Bayerische Akademie der Wissenschaften. In 1884 he was elected a member of the Academy of Sciences Leopoldina. His doctoral students include Heinrich Burkhardt, Eduard Ritter von Weber, and Christian August Vogler.

== Footnotes in the history of mathematics ==
In Ramanujan's first letter to G. H. Hardy, one of the theorems that impressed Hardy was:

$$1 - 5\left(\frac12\right)^3 + 9\left(\frac{1\times3}{2\times4}\right)^3 - 13\left(\frac{1\times3\times5}{2\times4\times6}\right)^3 + \cdots = \frac{2}{\pi}$$

However, Bauer proved the theorem in 1859. Using a result of Bauer on generalized continued fractions, Oskar Perron published in 1952 the first proof of another formula of Ramanujan.

== Selected publications ==
- Von den Integralen gewisser Differential-Gleichungen, welche in der Theorie der Anziehung vorkommen, Wild, München, 1857
- Von einigen Summen-und Differenzenformeln und den Bernouillschen Zahlen. Journal für die reine und angewandte Mathematik, vol. 58, pp. 292–300, 1861
- "Ueber Kegelschnitte." Journal für die reine und angewandte Mathematik, vol. 69, pp. 293–318, 1868
- "Von der Zerlegung der Discriminante der cubischen Gleichung, welche die Hauptaxen einer Fläche zweiter Ordnung bestimmen, in eine Summe von Quadraten." Journal für die reine und angewandte Mathematik vol. 71, pp. 40–45, 1869
- Über das Pascal'sche Theorem, in: Band 16 von Abhandlungen der Bayerischen Akademie der Wissenschaften, Mathematisch-Physikalische Klasse, Abhandlungen der Bayerischen Akademie der Wissenschaften, Mathematisch-Physikalische Klasse, Verlag der Akademie, München, 1873
- Gedächtnissrede auf Otto Hesse: gehalten in der öffentlichen Sitzung der k. b. Akademie der Wissenschaften zu München zur Feier ihres einhundert und dreiundzwanzigsten Stiftungstages am 28. März 1882 Verlag der Akademie, München, 1882 (See also Otto Hesse.)
- Von der Hesse'schen Determinante der Hesse'schen Fläche, einer Fläche dritter Ordnung, Verlag der Akademie, München, 1883
- Ueber die darstellung binärer formen als potenzsummen und insbesondere einer form vom grade 2 n̲ als eine summe von n̲ + 1 potenzen, Druck der Akademischen buchdruckerei von F. Straub, München, 1892
- Erinnerungen aus meinen Studienjahren, insbesondere mit Rücksicht auf die Entwickelung der Mathematik in jener Zeit : Fest -Vortrag zum XVI. Stiftungs-Feste am 7. Juli 1893, Buchdh. H. Wolf & S., München, 1893
- Vorlesungen über Algebra, B.G. Teubner, Leipzig, 1903

== Sources ==
- Laetitia Boehm: Die Ludwig-Maximilians-Universität in ihren Fakultäten, Band 1, Duncker & Humblot, Berlin, 1972, ISBN 3-428-02702-7, page 396.
- Michael-Markus Toepell: Mathematiker und Mathematik an der Universität München: 500 Jahre Lehre und Forschung, Institut für Geschichte der Naturwissenschaften, München, 1996, page 193.
- Walther Killy and Rudolf Vierhaus (eds.): Deutsche Biographische Enzyklopädie. volume 1, K.G. Saur Verlag GmbH & Co. KG, Munich1996, ISBN 3-598-23163-6, page 325.
