= Burkhardt quartic =

In mathematics, the Burkhardt quartic is a quartic threefold in 4-dimensional projective space studied by Burkhardt (1890, 1891, 1892), with the maximum possible number of 45 nodes.

== Definition ==
The equations defining the Burkhardt quartic become simpler if it is embedded in P^{5} rather than P^{4}. In this case it can be defined by the equations σ_{1} = σ_{4} = 0, where σ_{i} is the ith elementary symmetric function of the coordinates (x_{0} : x_{1} : x_{2} : x_{3} : x_{4} : x_{5}) of P^{5}.

== Properties ==
The automorphism group of the Burkhardt quartic is the Burkhardt group U_{4}(2) = PSp_{4}(3), a simple group of order 25920, which is isomorphic to a subgroup of index 2 in the Weyl group of E6.

The Burkhardt quartic is rational and furthermore birationally equivalent to a compactification of the Siegel modular variety A_{2}(3).
