= Judge Weber =

Judge Weber or Webber may refer to:

- E. Richard Webber (born 1942), judge of the United States District Court for the Eastern District of Missouri
- Gerald Joseph Weber (1914–1989), judge of the United States District Court for the Western District of Pennsylvania
- Herman Jacob Weber (born 1927), judge of the United States District Court for the Southern District of Ohio
- Randolph Henry Weber (1909–1961), judge of the United States District Court for the Eastern District of Missouri

== See also ==
- Justice Weber (disambiguation)
