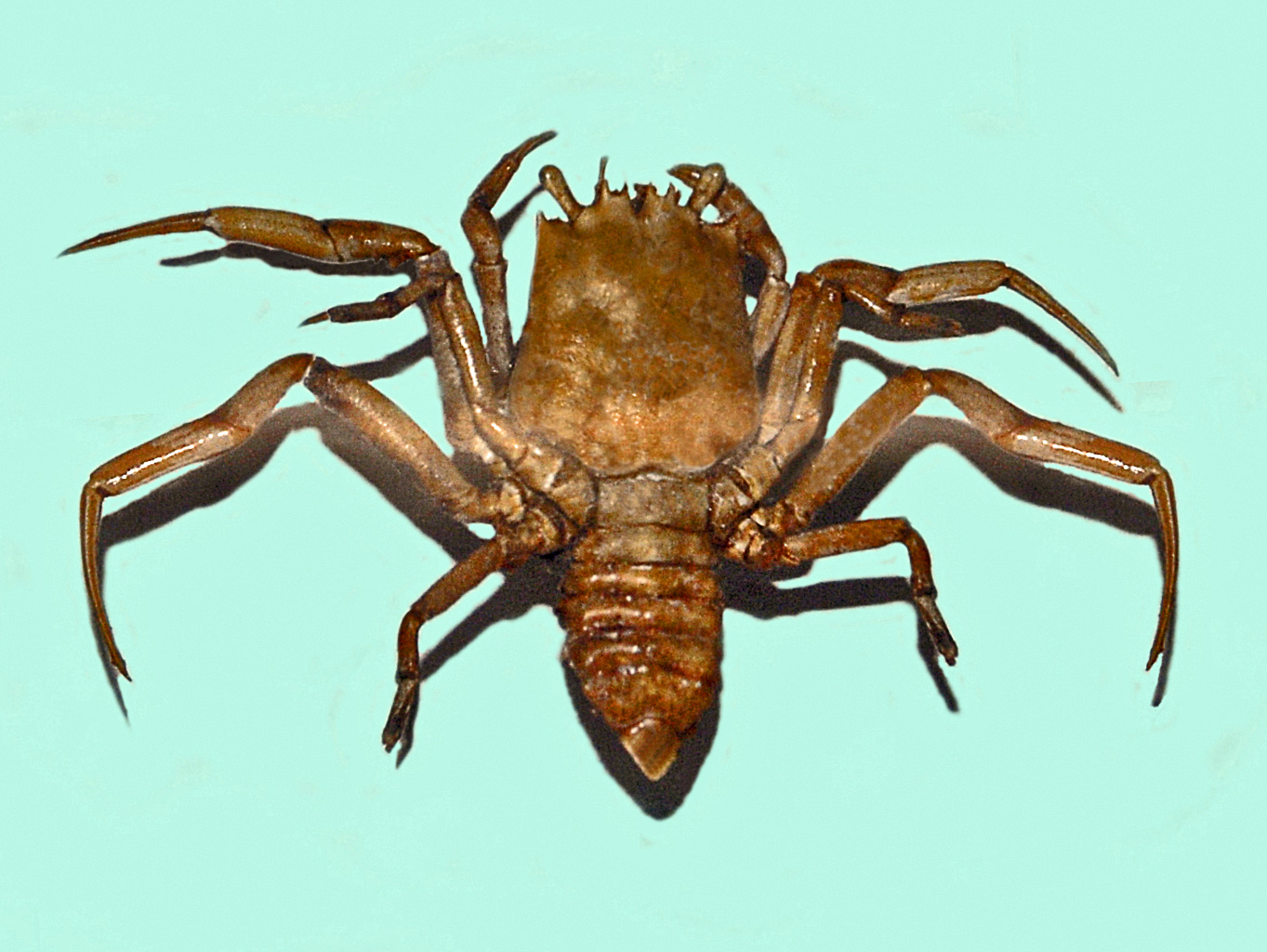
- Ethusa mascarone

Scientific classification
- Domain: Eukaryota
- Kingdom: Animalia
- Phylum: Arthropoda
- Class: Malacostraca
- Order: Decapoda
- Suborder: Pleocyemata
- Infraorder: Brachyura
- Family: Ethusidae
- Genus: Ethusa; Roux, 1830

= Ethusa =

Genus of crabs

Ethusa is a genus of crabs in the family Ethusidae.

== Species ==
- Ethusa americana A. Milne-Edwards, 1880
- Ethusa mascarone (Herbst, 1785)
- Ethusa microphthalma S. I. Smith, 1881 - Broadback Sumo Crab
- Ethusa tenuipes M. J. Rathbun, 1897
- Ethusa truncata A. Milne-Edwards & Bouvier, 1899 - Truncate Sumo Crab
