= Hans Hermann Weber =

German physiologist and biochemist

Hans Hermann Julius Wilhelm Weber (17 June 1896 – 12 June 1974) was a German physiologist and biochemist who worked on muscle structure and function. He was among the pioneers who helped establish the mechanism of muscle relaxation and contraction. His daughter Annemarie Weber also continued work in myosin biochemistry.

Weber was born in Berlin, son of physician Hermann Weber and Annemarie Becher. He studied at the Mommsen Gymnasium in Berlin and in 1914 he was conscripted and continued in military service until 1919 although he was wounded in 1916, allowing him to study medicine for a semester. After 1919 he continued his studies at Greifswald, Rostock and Heidelberg. His doctoral dissertation was under Hans Winterstein at Rostock and examined the role of lactic acid in rigor mortis induction. He received an MD in 1921 and worked in the laboratory of Otto Meyerhof at Kiel with a focus on muscle energetics. In 1922 he moved to Rostock to work again under Winterstein. He worked on the separation of myogen and myosin, following the work of Otto von Fürth and then began to examine the theories of muscle contraction. He then moved to Berlin where he worked under Peter Rona and interacted with Leonor Michaelis, Otto Warburg, and Kurt Hans Meyer. He moved to Münster University in 1927 and worked under Rudolf Rosemann and here he was able to produce myosin strands (actomyosin) and this was further developed by Alexander von Muralt and John Tileston Edsall at the Harvard Medical School in 1928 and the term Weber-Edsall myosin became commonplace. He became a chair of physiological chemistry at Königsberg University in 1939 but the war broke out and his studies were interrupted. However along with his colleague Manfred von Ardenne he was able to examine myosin using an electron microscope in 1941. Researchers in Moscow found that myosin was breaking down ATP while Albert Szent-Györgyi in Hungary found that ATP caused myosin to shrink. Work on isolating actin and myosin was begun by Brunó F. Straub. In 1944 the Nazi government funded Weber to study the use of animal serum albumin for human transfusion and he left Königsberg just before Soviet occupation. In 1946 he moved to the University of Tübingen and in 1954 he became director of the institute for physiology of the Max Planck Institute at Heidelberg. He worked here until his retirement in 1966.

He married Marga Oltmanns, a philosophy student at Rostock, in 1922 and they had two daughters and a son including Annemarie Weber who studied under her father and prospered with her own research at the University of Pennsylvania.
