= Ernst Weber =

Ernst Weber may refer to:

- Ernst Heinrich Weber (1795–1878), German physician; founder of experimental psychology
- Ernst Weber (engineer) (1901–1996), Austrian-American electrical engineer
- Ernst Weber (footballer) (1902–1991), Swiss footballer and chairman
- Ernst Weber (coach)
