= Jonas Weber =

German politician (born 1982)

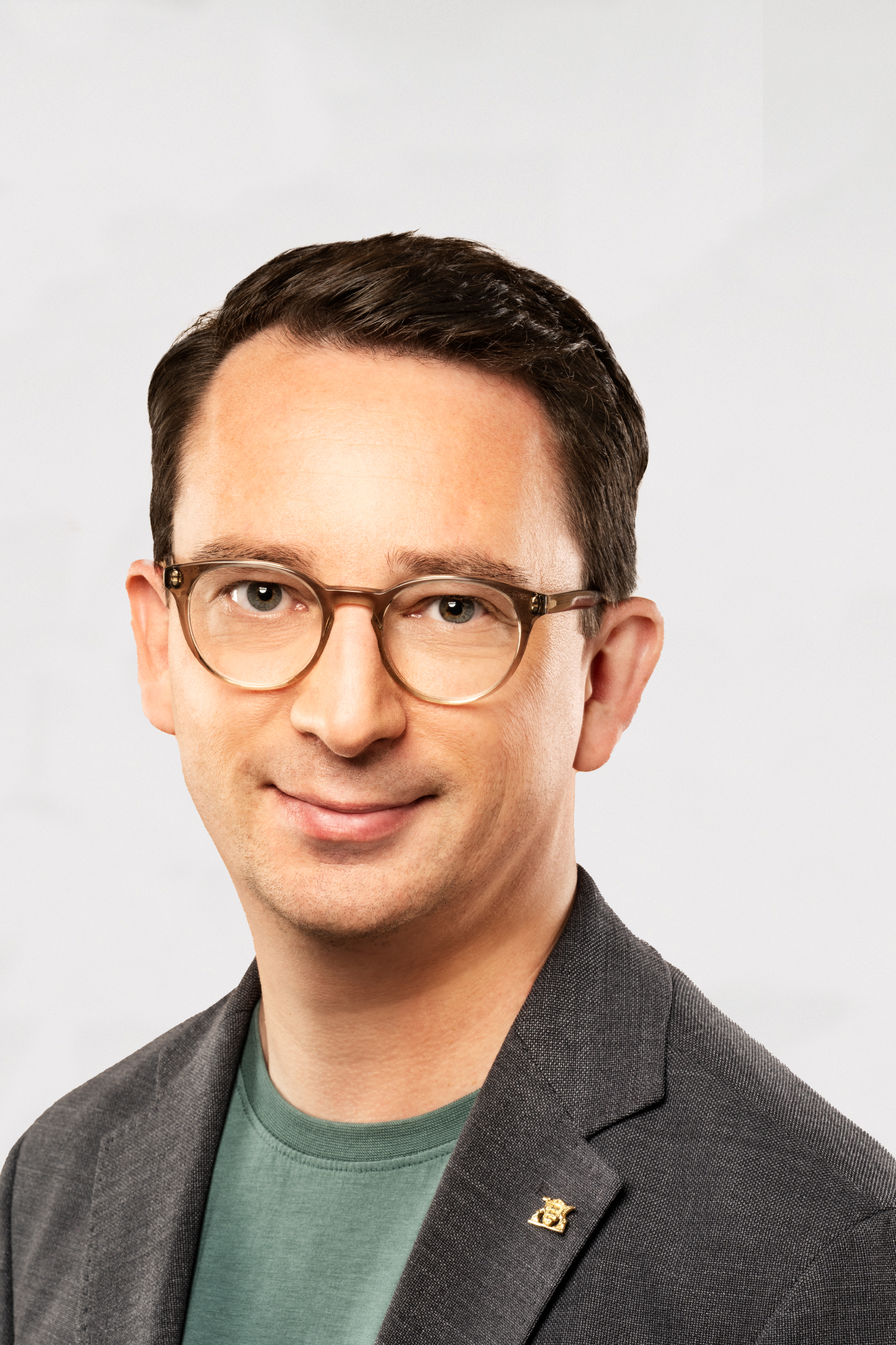
- Weber in 2021

Member of the Landtag of Baden-Württemberg
- Incumbent
- Assumed office 1 September 2018
- Preceded by: Ernst Kopp
- Constituency: Rastatt

Personal details
- Born: 26 July 1982 (age 43) Schwäbisch Gmünd
- Party: Social Democratic Party

Jonas Nicolas Weber (born 26 July 1982 in Schwäbisch Gmünd) is a German politician serving as a member of the Landtag of Baden-Württemberg since 2018. He has served as chairman of the Social Democratic Party in Rastatt and Baden-Baden since 2007.
