= Heinrich Weber =

Heinrich Weber may refer to:

- Heinrich Friedrich Weber (1843–1912), German physicist
- Heinrich Martin Weber (1842–1913), German mathematician
- Heinrich Emil Weber, Swiss mathematician, one of the designers of the NEMA encryption system
- Heinrich Weber (footballer) (1900–1977), German international footballer
- Heini Weber (1923-2010), German Olympic wrestler
