= Carl Weber =

Carl Weber may refer to:

- Carl Weber (architect), 19th-century German architect who designed many churches in the Netherlands; see Carl Weber (in Dutch)
- Carl Weber (artist) (1851–1921), German-American artist, son of Paul Weber
- Carl Weber (author) (born 1964), American author and publisher
- Carl Weber (theatre director) (1925–2016), theatre director and professor of drama
- Carl Albert Weber (1856–1931), German botanist
- Carl David Maria Weber (1814–1881) Palatine-born American settler in Stockton, California
- Carl Maria von Weber (1786–1826), German composer
- Karl Ivanovich Weber (1841–1910), diplomat of the Russian Empire
- Karl Otto Weber (1827–1867), German surgeon and pathologist
- Max Carl Wilhelm Weber (1852–1937), German zoologist and biogeographer

== See also ==
- Karl Weber (disambiguation)
