= Peter Weber =

Pete or Peter Weber may refer to:

- Peter Weber (gymnast) (1938–2024), German gymnast
- Pete Weber (sportscaster) (born 1951), American sports commentator for the ice hockey team Nashville Predators
- Pete Weber (bowler) (born 1962), American professional bowler
- Peter Weber (handballer) (1962–1999), Swiss handball player
- Peter Weber (television personality) (born 1991), American television personality
- Peter J. Weber (1893–1983), American architect
- Peter Weber, suspect of the Hinterkaifeck murders

== See also ==
- Peter Webber (born 1960), British director
- Pete Webber, percussionist for American heavy metal band Fear Factory
