= Otto Weber =

Otto Weber may refer to:

- Otto Weber (painter) (1832–1888), German painter
- Otto Weber (politician) (1921–2001), Romanian politician
- Otto Weber (theologian) (1902–1966), German theologian
