= Charles Weber =

Charles Weber may refer to:

- Carl David Maria Weber (1814–1881), also known as Charles M. Weber I, Palatine-born American founder of Stockton, California
- Charles M. Weber III (1893–1987), American politician
- Charles Weber (baseball), general manager of the Chicago Cubs
- Chuck Weber (American football) (1930–2017), American football linebacker
- Chuck Weber (ice hockey) (born 1973), American ice hockey coach
- Chuck Weber (racing driver) (born 1958), American stock car driver
- Chuck Weber (politician), American politician and member of the Kansas House of Representatives
- Charles Weber (politician) (1923–1989), state legislator in Florida who served in the Florida Senate

== See also ==
- Charlie Weber (disambiguation)
- Charles Webber (disambiguation)
