= Hubert Weber =

Hubert Weber may refer to:

- Hubert Weber (judge) (born 1939), Austrian judge
- Hubert Weber (politician) (1929–2017), German lawyer and politician
