= Ben Weber =

Ben Weber or Benjamin Weber may refer to:

- Ben Weber (composer) (1916–1979), American composer
- Ben Weber (baseball) (born 1969), Major League Baseball right-handed relief pitcher
- Ben Weber (actor) (born 1972), American film and television actor
- Bernardus Weber (1912–1996), Dutch sculptor
- Benjamin Weber (politician), American politician

== See also ==
- Benjamin Webber (disambiguation)
