= Karl Weber =

Karl Weber may refer to:

- Karl Weber (politician, born 1898) (1898–1985), German politician (CDU), West Germany's Minister of Justice from April to October 1965
- Karl Weber (politician, born 1936) (1936-2026), German politician (CDU)
- Karl-Heinz Weber (1922–1944), German World War II flying ace
- Karl Ivanovich Weber (1841–1910), Russian diplomat
- Karl Jakob Weber (1712–1764), Swiss architect and engineer; led first organized excavations at Herculaneum, Pompeii and Stabiae
- Karl Julius Weber (1767–1832), German writer and satirist
- Karl Weber (actor) (1918–1990), actor in long-running American soap opera Guiding Light
- Karl Weber (racing driver) (born 1996), American racing driver and author
- Karl Otto Weber (1827–1867), German surgeon and pathologist
- Karl Weber (art director) (1897–1965), German art director
- Karl Weber, mayor of Hadres, Hollabrunn, Lower Austria, Austria

== See also ==
- Carl Weber (disambiguation)
