= Arthur L. Weber =

American chemist

Arthur L. Weber is an American chemist, whose research field is pre-life chemistry, was a pioneer to reveal the role of thioester in abiogenesis. He has worked in Salk Institute for Biological Studies and NASA Ames Research Center successively.
