= Christiane Weber =

Christiane Weber or Christine Weber may refer to:

- Christiane Weber (fencer) (born 1962), German fencer
- Christiane Weber (rower), German rower
- Christine Weber (producer), see Women in Film & Video-DC Women of Vision Awards
