= Annemarie Weber =

German-born American physiologist (1923–2012)

- Born: 11 September 1923; Tübingen, West Germany
- Died: 5 July 2012 (aged 88); Philadelphia, Pennsylvania
- Education: University of Tübingen
- Occupation: Physiologist
- Known for: Regulation of actin

Annemarie Weber (11 September 1923 – 5 July 2012) was a German-born American physiologist who studied the biochemistry of muscle action. She was the daughter of the German physiologist Hans Hermann Weber, who also studied muscle structure and function.

== Biography ==
Weber was born in Tübingen, West Germany, where her father worked at the university, and grew up in Königsberg, Germany. Her brother Jürgen Weber (1928–2007) became a sculptor. She was often separated from family during World War II without any news about their welfare.

She joined the University of Tübingen and received an MD in 1950 and then studied myosin ATPase for her doctorate. She received a Rockefeller foundation grant and spent her postdoctoral work at University College London with A.V. Hill and at Harvard University. She also trained under her father who had friends around the world including Albert Szent-Györgyi who had moved to the United States.

=== Career ===
Weber first went to Columbia University as a research associate in 1954 and became a lecturer in 1959. She became a professor at St. Louis University Medical School, Missouri in 1965 and moved to the University of Pennsylvania in 1972 where she worked until her death. Her work was on the regulation of actin. She demonstrated the role of Ca^{2+} ions as intracellular signals and on actin polymerization. Her final academic position was as Professor Emerita of Biochemistry, University of Pennsylvania (1972–2012).

Annemarie Weber died on 5 July 2012 in Philadelphia, Pennsylvania, from lung cancer, as she was on her way to her summer home in Woods Hole, Massachusetts.

=== Honors ===
- Berwick award in 1985
- University’s Provost Award in 2001

== Selected works ==
- Weber, Annemarie, Ruth Herz, and Ingrid Reiss. "On the mechanism of the relaxing effect of fragmented sarcoplasmic reticulum." The Journal of general physiology 46, no. 4 (1963): 679-702.
- Weber, Annemarie. "Energized calcium transport and relaxing factors." In Current topics in bioenergetics, vol. 1, pp. 203-254. Elsevier, 1966.
- Weber, Annemarie, and John M. Murray. "Molecular control mechanisms in muscle contraction." Physiological reviews 53, no. 3 (1973): 612-673.
- Weber, Annemarie, Cynthia R. Pennise, Gary G. Babcock, and Velia M. Fowler. "Tropomodulin caps the pointed ends of actin filaments." The Journal of cell biology 127, no. 6 (1994): 1627-1635.
