= Werner Weber =

Werner Weber may refer to:

- Werner Weber (canoeist) (born 1939), Swiss athlete in the 1960 Olympics
- Werner Weber (mathematician) (1906–1975), German student of Emmy Noether, wartime cryptographer, and Nazi
- Werner Weber (artist), mural painter of Deutz Abbey, near Cologne in Germany
- Werner Weber (cyclist) (1942–2001), Swiss winner of the 1963 Stausee-Rundfahrt Klingnau
- Werner Weber (journalist) (1919–2005), Swiss journalist and literary scholar, 1967 winner of the Johann-Heinrich-Merck-Preis
- Werner Weber (Kriegsmarine) (died 1944), commander of German submarine U-845
- Werner Weber (politician), mayor of Naurath (Wald), a municipality in Germany
