= Ricardo Weber (disambiguation) =

Ricardo Weber may refer to:

- Ricardo Weber Kunstmann (1918–1991), Chilean dentist, farmer and politician
- Ricardo Lagos Weber (born 1962), Chilean politician
