= Marc Weber (ice hockey) =

Swiss ice hockey player

- Born: 5 July 1973 (age 51); Biel, Switzerland
- Height: 5 ft 7 in (170 cm)
- Weight: 161 lb (73 kg; 11 st 7 lb)
- Position: Centre
- Shot: Left
- Played for: EHC Biel; SC Bern; Rapperswil-Jona Lakers
- Playing career: 1991–2006

Marc Weber (born 5 July 1973) is a Swiss former professional ice hockey centre. He played in the Swiss Nationalliga A for EHC Biel, SC Rapperswil-Jona Lakers and SC Bern.

== Career statistics ==
			Regular season					Playoffs
Season	Team	League	GP	G	A	Pts	PIM	GP	G	A	Pts	PIM
1990–91	EHC Biel	NLA	2	0	0	0	0	1	0	0	0	0
1991–92	EHC Biel	NLA	36	5	11	16	20	4	0	1	1	2
1993–94	EHC Biel	NLA	33	5	9	14	30	—	—	—	—	—
1994–95	EHC Biel	NLA	17	0	2	2	30	—	—	—	—	—
1994–95	SC Rapperswil-Jona Lakers	NLA	12	2	2	4	16	—	—	—	—	—
1995–96	SC Rapperswil-Jona Lakers	NLA	32	4	8	12	46	4	0	3	3	0
1996–97	SC Rapperswil-Jona Lakers	NLA	41	14	23	37	35	3	0	0	0	4
1997–98	SC Rapperswil-Jona Lakers	NLA	40	7	25	32	46	7	1	4	5	6
1998–99	SC Bern	NLA	42	8	26	34	24	6	1	3	4	0
1999–00	SC Bern	NLA	45	10	22	32	46	5	1	0	1	4
2000–01	SC Bern	NLA	38	8	20	28	53	9	1	2	3	33
2001–02	SC Bern	NLA	43	8	11	19	34	6	1	7	8	0
2002–03	SC Bern	NLA	36	8	12	20	24	13	1	4	5	6
2003–04	SC Bern	NLA	48	10	20	30	64	14	4	1	5	0
2004–05	SC Rapperswil-Jona Lakers	NLA	37	8	27	35	46	4	0	1	1	6
2005–06	SC Rapperswil-Jona Lakers	NLA	44	6	18	24	87	7	0	1	1	4
NLA totals			546	103	236	339	601	83	10	27	37	65

== Achievements ==
- 2004 - NLA Champion with SC Bern
  Marc Weber scored the game-winning goal in the overtime of the last playoff finals game against HC Lugano.
