= Friedrich Weber (musician) =

German organist and composer

Friedrich (Frederic) Weber (5 November 1819 – 16 February 1909) was a German organist and composer.

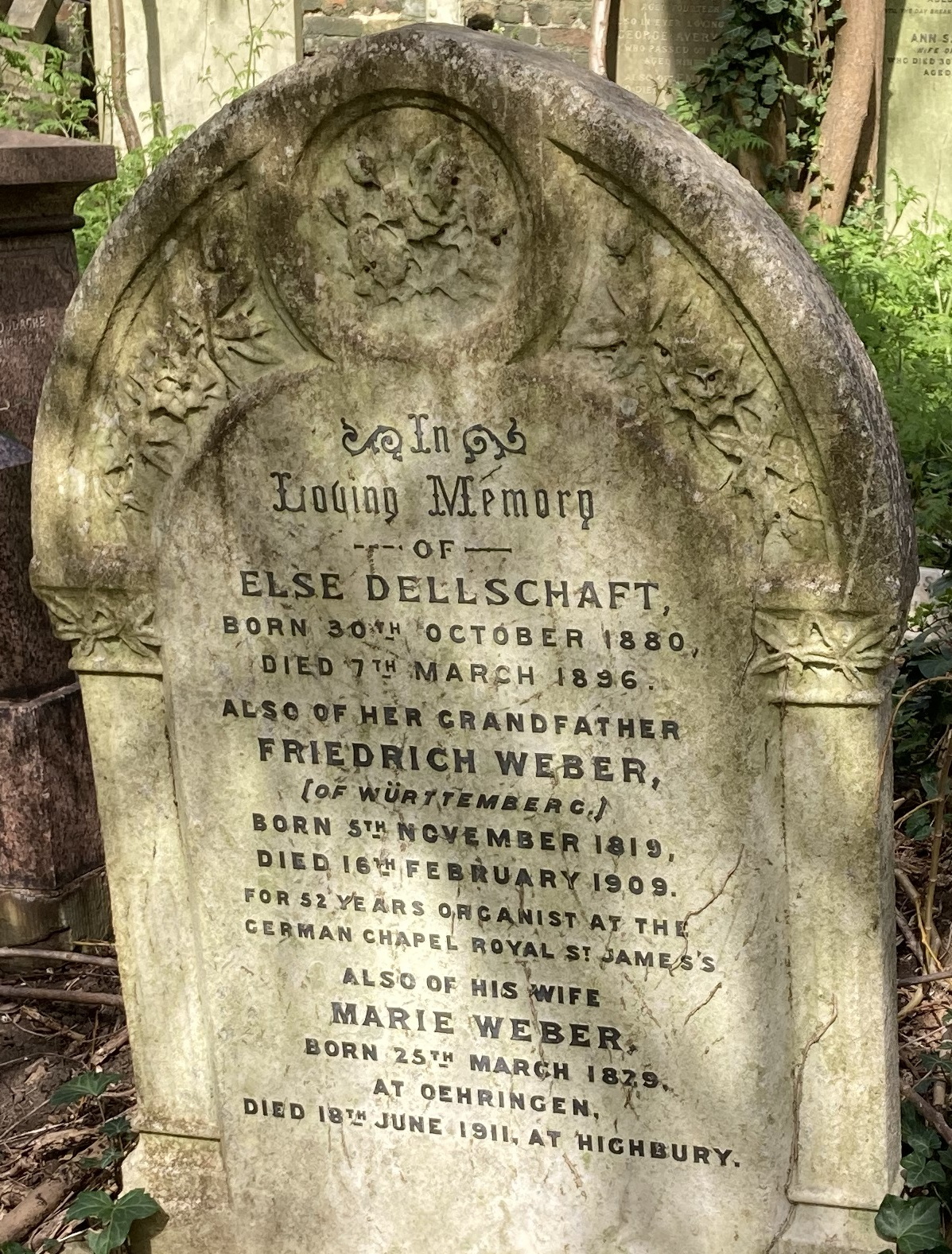
Family Grave of Friedrich Weber in Highgate Cemetery

Born in Künzelsau, Württemberg, Weber studied music in Stuttgart, and became a teacher at the Pestalozzi-Institut in Worksop (Nottinghamshire) in 1841 after spending a year in Esslingen. 1845 he was appointed organist at the „Hamburger Lutherische Kirche“ (Hamburg Lutheran Church) in the City of London. For 52 years, from 1849 to his retirement in 1901, he served as organist at the German Chapel Royal at Saint James´s Palace. He married in 1851 and died in London in 1909 and is buried on the west side of Highgate Cemetery.

As a composer, Weber was primarily active in the area of chamber music. 20 works with opus numbers are known. His compositions were mainly published in Germany. In 1900, Weber was awarded The Royal Order of the Crown (German: Königlicher Kronen-Orden) by the German Emperor.

Weber also authored several books about music with the aim of furthering musical understanding, especially for amateurs.

== Works ==
Musical Compositions

- Chamber music, Opus 1 – 20

Thereof

- 4 Piano trios
  - op. 13 G Major
  - op. 14, D Major
  - op. 15, F Major, Trio facile
  - op. 20, E flat Major
- 6 Duos for Viola (or Cello) and Piano, op. 18

Texts about music

- Popular history of music from the earliest times
- The pianist’s practical guide
- Comprehensive counterpoint
- Numeral notation, or An easy method of mastering harmony and counterpoint
