= Rudolf Weber =

Rudolf Weber may refer to:

- Rudolf Weber (aviator) (1890–1918), World War I flying ace
- Rudolf Weber (fencer) (1903–?), Austrian Olympic fencer
- Rudolf Weber (musicologist) (1937–2026), German musicologist and academic
- Rudolf Weber (handballer) (born 1957), Swiss handballer
- Rudolf Weber (architect), co-designer of the Millennium Tower, Vienna, Austria
- Rudolf Weber (politician), President of the Swiss Council of States 1955/56
