= General Weber =

General Weber may refer to:

- Alois Weber (general) (1903–1976), German Wehrmacht major general
- Christian Weber (SS general) (1883–1945), German SS brigadier general
- Erich Weber (1860–1933), German Imperial Army general
- Friedrich Weber (general) (1892–1974), German Wehrmacht lieutenant general
- Friedrich Weber (veterinarian) (1892–1955), German SS general
- Gottfried Weber (general) (1899–1958), German Wehrmacht lieutenant general
- La Vern E. Weber (1923–1999), U.S. Army lieutenant general
- Max Weber (general) (1824–1901), Union Army brigadier general

== See also ==
- Norman W. Webber (1881–1950), British Army brigadier general
