= Ken Weber =

American journalist

Ken J. Weber
- Born: November 28, 1943; Ottoville, Ohio, U.S.
- Died: August 2, 2007 (aged 63)
- Occupation(s): Author; Journalist
- Employer: Providence Journal (1971-96)
- Spouse: Betti J. (Hoorman) Weber
- Children: Four children

Ken J. Weber (November 28, 1943 – August 2, 2007), born in Ottoville, Ohio, was a Rhode Island journalist and nature writer. He worked for the Providence Journal from 1971 until 1996, when he retired as section editor. He continued to write a weekly nature article until his death.

He has written many books about hiking, including bird-watching trails. His book, Weekend Walks in Rhode Island, is in its fourth edition, and is a popular guide for day hikes in the state. He wrote the text for the guide through the Mowry Conservation Area, used to guide visitors through the seven scenic walks in Smithfield, Rhode Island. Ken held a staff position at the Audubon Society of Rhode Island and offered occasional nature talks.

Weber was posthumously inducted into the 2008 Hall of Fame, by the Rhode Island Press Association. He is survived by his wife of 42 years, Betti J. (Hoorman) Weber, and four children.

== Bibliography ==
- Wanderings, co-authored with Providence Journal Company, Dutch Island Press, 1989.
- More Walks and Rambles in Rhode Island, Backcountry Publications, 1992.
- Walks and Rambles in Rhode Island: A Guide to the Natural and Historic Wonders of the Ocean State, Backcountry Publications, 1993.
- Canoeing Massachusetts, Rhode Island and Connecticut, Backcountry Publications, 1995.
- A century of dedication: The first 100 years of the Audubon Society of Rhode Island, Audubon Society of Rhode Island, 1997.
- Paddling Southern New England: 30 Canoe Trips in Massachusetts, Rhode Island, and Connecticut, W.W. Norton Inc., 2001.
- Weekend Walks in Rhode Island: 40 Trails for Hiking, Birding & Nature Viewing, W.W. Norton Inc., 2005.

In December 2016, the book, Rhode Island Birding Trails: Over 60 Places to Watch Birds in the Ocean State, was published and dedicated to Weber. His close friend Jeff Hall had co-authored the book with Weber, however, after Weber's death in 2007, the book sat unfinished and unpublished until Hall and a colleague, rechecked the work, beginning in 2013.
