= Justice Weber =

Justice Weber may refer to:

- Albert J. Weber (1859–1925), associate justice of the Utah Supreme Court
- Fred J. Weber (1919–2007), associate justice of the Montana Supreme Court

== See also ==
- Donald W. Webber (1906–1995), associate justice of the Maine Supreme Judicial Court
- Judge Weber (disambiguation)
