= Paul Weber =

Paul Weber may refer to:

- Paul Weber (artist) (1823–1916), German artist
- Andreas Paul Weber (1893–1980), German artist and cartoonist
- Paul Weber (academic) (1904–1983), interim president of Georgia Tech
- Paul Weber (unionist), 20th-century Catholic American unionist
