= Bruce Weber =

Bruce Weber may refer to:

- Bruce Weber (administrator) (1951–2006), Australian sports administrator
- Bruce Weber (basketball) (born 1956), American basketball coach
- Bruce Weber (photographer) (born 1946), American photographer and film director
