= Charlie Weber =

Charlie Weber may refer to:

- Charlie Weber (baseball) (1868–1914), Major League Baseball pitcher
- Charlie Weber (actor) (born 1978), American actor

== See also ==
- Charles Weber (disambiguation)
