= Eduard Ritter von Weber =

German mathematician

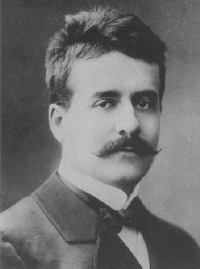

Eduard Ritter von Weber (12 May 1870 in Munich – 20 June 1934 in Würzburg) was a German mathematician and Bavarian Royal Privy Counselor. He was a member of the noble Bavarian knightly family Ritter von Weber.

Von Weber attended the Maximiliansgymnasium München and afterward from 1888 to 1894 pursued studies in mathematics at the Ludwig-Maximilians-Universität München, the University of Göttingen, and the University of Paris. In 1893, he was awarded the Ph.D. from the Ludwig-Maximilians-Universität München (his dissertation being titled Studien zur Theorie der infinitesimalen Transformationen, Gustav C. Bauer, advisor). His Habilitation followed at the Ludwig-Maximilians-Universität München in 1895, and he became full professor there in 1903. He moved to the University of Würzburg in 1907.

Von Weber concerned himself particularly with partial differential equations, in particular the Pfaff problem, and wrote the article "Partial Differential Equations" in the Enzyklopädie der mathematischen Wissenschaften (Encyclopedia of the Mathematical Sciences).

Von Weber had versatile interests and spoke numerous languages, including Russian, Portuguese, Spanish, Norwegian, Persian, Arabic, Hebrew and Irish.
