= Ann E. Weber =

American chemist

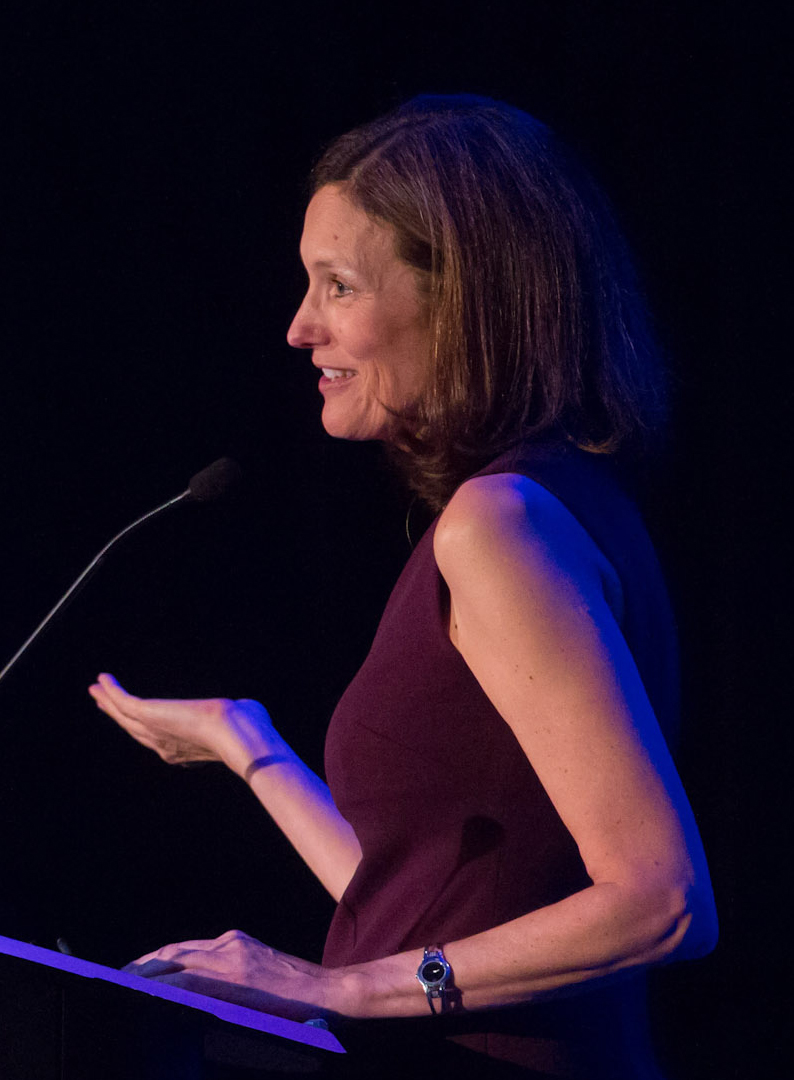
- Weber, Perkin Medal speech, 2017
- Education: University of Notre Dame, Harvard University
- Awards: Perkin Medal (2017), MEDI Hall of Fame (2016)
- Scientific career
- Fields: Medicinal chemistry, drug discovery
- Workplaces: Kallyope Inc., Merck Research Laboratories

Ann E. Weber is the senior vice president for drug discovery at Kallyope Inc. in New York City. She previously worked with Merck Research Laboratories (MRL), joining the company in 1987 and retiring from the position of vice president for lead optimization chemistry in 2015. She has helped develop more than 40 drug candidates including FDA-approved treatments for Type 2 diabetes. She has received a number of awards, including the Perkin Medal (2017) and has been inducted into the ACS Division of Medicinal Chemistry’s MEDI Hall of Fame.

== Education ==
Weber grew up in Oshkosh, Wisconsin, the child of a nurse and a doctor. There she attended Lourdes High School (Oshkosh, Wisconsin), a Catholic school.

Weber earned a B.S. degree in chemistry summa cum laude from the University of Notre Dame (1982). She also was able to attend Caltech for a year (1982-1983). Ann Weber took part in a summer internship for Monsanto from June 1982-August 1982 where she studied the synthesis of novel herbicides for crop protection. To complete her education, Ann received a Ph.D. degree from Harvard University, where she studied synthetic organic chemistry with David A. Evans. She was the first woman to receive a Ph.D. from his group, in 1987.

== Research ==
Weber joined Merck Research Laboratories (MRL) in Rahway, New Jersey, in 1987, retiring in 2015 from the position of vice president for lead optimization chemistry. In 2016 she joined Kallyope Inc. in New York City as senior vice president for drug discovery. Her research areas include the development of ligands for G protein–coupled receptors, Ligand-gated ion channels and enzymes.

During her career in drug discovery and development, she has published more than 80 publications. She is a co-inventor of more than 35 issued US patents. Her work has led to the development of more than 40 drug candidates including FDA-approved treatments for Type 2 diabetes. Other drug candidates target obesity, atherosclerosis, pain, and urinary incontinence.

Beginning in 1999, Weber led the chemical team for the development of Januvia (generic: sitagliptin), a drug that inhibits the dipeptidyl peptidase-4 (DPP-4) enzyme and improves glucose tolerance to treat Type 2 diabetes. Nancy Thornberry led the corresponding biological team for the project. The drug was approved by the FDA in October 2006. Janumet, a drug combining sitagliptin and metformin was also approved, in April 2007. In 2007, the research team at Merck received the Prix Galien USA award for their work on Januvia.

== Awards ==
- 2017, Perkin Medal, Society of Chemical Industry (American Section)
- 2016, MEDI Hall of Fame, ACS Division of Medicinal Chemistry
- 2013, Women in STEM honoree, Liberty Science Center (LSC)
- 2012-2013, Sylvia M. Stoesser Lecturer in Chemistry, University of Illinois
- 2011, Discoverer’s Award, Pharmaceutical Research and Manufacturers of America (PhRMA), with Nancy Thornberry
- 2011, Thomas Alva Edison Patent Award, Research and Development Council of New Jersey
- 2010, Heroes of Chemistry Award (ACS) with Nancy Thornberry and Joseph Armstrong
- 2010, Robert M. Scarborough Award for Excellence in Medicinal Chemistry, American Chemistry Society (ACS)
- 2008, Outstanding Women of Science honoree, New Jersey Association for Biomedical Research (NJABR)
- 2007, Prix Galien USA award to the Merck research team for Januvia
- Merck & Co. Director’s Award, the highest honor that Merck confers on its employees
