= Gerard Weber (footballer, born 1938) =

Dutch association football player

Personal information
- Date of birth: 5 January 1938 (age 88)
- Place of birth: Netherlands
- Positions: Midfielder; forward

Senior career*
| Years | Team | Apps | (Gls) |
- Steeds Volharden
| 1956–1970 | Excelsior | 234 | |
| 1988–2018? | Excelsior veterans | | |

Managerial career
- –1972: Excelsior (youth)
- 1972–1976: RVVH
- 1976–1981: Vitesse Delft
- 1981–1982: SSS Klaaswaal
- 1982–1985: MVV '27
- 1985–1986: Fortuna Vlaardingen
- 1986–1988: ASWH
- * Club domestic league appearances and goals

Gerard Weber (born 5 January 1938) is a Dutch former professional footballer for Excelsior Rotterdam. Nicknamed Webertje (English: Little Weber), Weber was known for his speed. He played both as a midfielder and as a forward. Weber won several championships with Excelsior. He went on to manage football teams in the Rotterdam region, living in Zwijdrecht.

== Early and personal life ==
During his mandatory military service, Weber was a fitness coach. He is married to Marga.

== Football career ==
Initially, Gerard played for Steeds Volharden. Gerard Weber played in the first squad of Excelsior Rotterdam between the years 1956 and 1970. During these years he had 234 caps. For many years, he was among the opening eleven of Excelsior. In 1966 there were rumors of a transfer to Sparta Rotterdam. In 1968, already an Excelsior bencher, Weber replaced George Velberg in the extension and headed the decisive goal (3–2) in a cup game that Eredivie-team Sitterdia had previously led 0–2. This sensation brought Excelsior, temporarily in the Tweede Divisie, to the quarterfinals, where it lost to another Eredivisie-side, FC Twente.

Weber managed Excelsior Rotterdam youth teams (19??–72), RVVH (1972–76), Vitesse Delft (1976–81), SSS Klaaswaal (1981–82), MVV '27 (1982–85), Fortuna Vlaardingen (1985–86), and ASWH (1986–88). ASWH let Weber go before completing his second season, when it rehired Weber's predecessor for the remainder of the season.

After his manager career, from his 50th, he played for the veterans of Excelsior. In 2018, at the age of 80, he was the oldest active footballing former professional in the Netherlands.
