= Gerard Weber (footballer, born 1941) =

Dutch footballer (born 1941)

Personal information
- Date of birth: 22 August 1941 (age 85)
- Place of birth: 's-Hertogenbosch, Netherlands

Youth career
- BVV Den Bosch

Senior career*
Years	Team	Apps	(Gls)
- BVV Den Bosch
- VV DOS
- NEC Nijmegen
- PSV Eindhoven
- EVV Eindhoven
- * Club domestic league appearances and goals

Gerard Weber (born 22 August 1941) is a Dutch former footballer who played as a left winger.

== Career ==
Born in 's-Hertogenbosch, Weber started playing soccer at BVV Den Bosch, with whom he later made his debut in paid football in the Eerste Divisie. Initially, Weber played on in professional leagues on amateur contracts because of his day job as a salesperson. As a result, Joseph Gruber could select him for the Dutch amateur football team. He also played for the Dutch military football team. Joseph Gruber brought Weber in 1961 to VV DOS, where Weber turned full-professional and played in the Eredivisie. With DOS he played in the 1962–63 and 1963–64 Inter-Cities Fairs Cup.

After three seasons at DOS and one more year at BVV, Weber signed with NEC Nijmegen. In January 1969 he joined PSV Eindhoven and a year later EVV Eindhoven, where he ended his career. With PSV he participated in the 1969–70 edition of the UEFA Cup Winners' Cup.

== Personal life ==
Gerard's brothers, Harrie and Sjef, also played for BVV.

== Career statistics ==
Appearances and goals by club, season and competition
Club	Season	League			National cup		Continental		Total	
Club	Season	Division	Apps	Goals	Apps	Goals	Apps	Goals	Apps	Goals
DOS Utrecht	1961–62	Eredivisie	30	6						
DOS Utrecht	1962–63	Eredivisie	30	7			1	0		
DOS Utrecht	1963–64	Eredivisie	23	4			1	0		
DOS Utrecht	Total		83	17			2	0		
NEC Nijmegen	1967–68	Eredivisie	31	1			0	0		
NEC Nijmegen	1968–69	Eredivisie	3	0			0	0		
NEC Nijmegen	Total		34	1			0	0		
PSV Eindhoven	1968–69	Eredivisie	7	2			0	0		
PSV Eindhoven	1969–70	Eredivisie	3	1			1	0		
PSV Eindhoven	Total		10	3			1	0		
