= Peter Rona (physician) =

Peter Rona, born as Peter Rosenfeld (13. May 1871 in Budapest-February or March 1945) was a Hungarian-German Jewish physician and physiologist.
