= Max Maria von Weber =

German civil engineer (1822–1881)

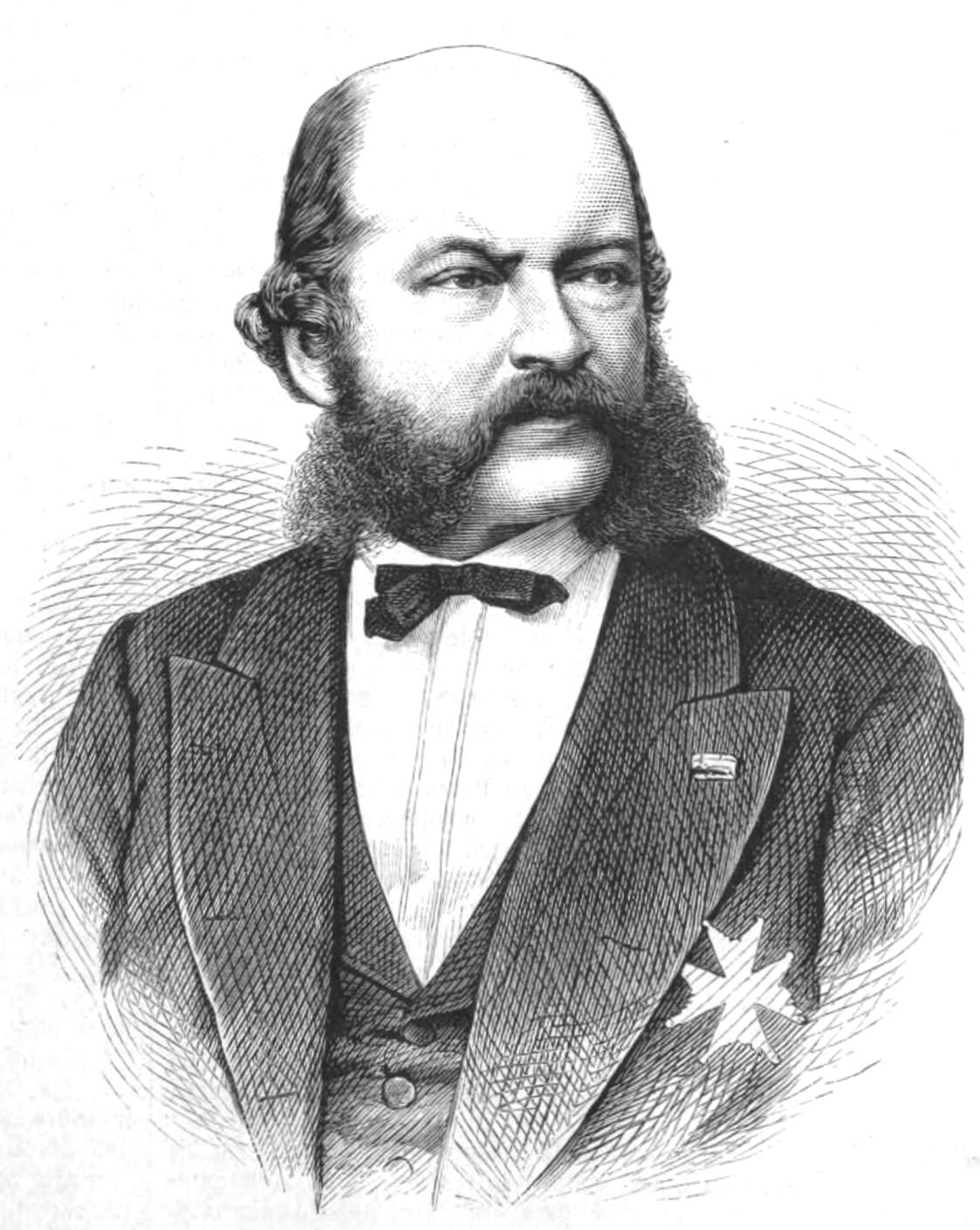
Max Maria von Weber in 1879

Max Maria von Weber (25 April 1822 in Dresden – 18 April 1881 in Berlin) was a German civil engineer who contributed to the development of railways in Austria and Germany.

He was born in Dresden in the Kingdom of Saxony, the son of the composer Carl Maria von Weber, and received his early training in the Dresden schools. Part of his experience was gained under Isambard Kingdom Brunel and George Stephenson in England. In 1850, he entered the civil service of his native kingdom. In 1870 he went to Vienna, where he did much toward the extension of Austrian railways. In 1878, he was called in a similar capacity to Berlin.

== Writings ==
Outside of his official duties Weber found time for considerable writing, in the line of general literature as well as on technical matters. Among his works may be cited:

- Schule des Eisenbahnwesens (1857), approximate translation Tutorial on Railways
- Karl Maria von Weber; ein Lebensbild (1864–66), a biography of his father
- Die Praxis des Baues und Betriebs der Sekundärbahnen (1873)
- Nationalität und Eisenbahnpolitik (1876), approximate translation Nationality and Railway Politics
- Vom rollenden Flügelrad (posthumously published by M. Jähns, with biography, 1882)
