= Weber (Franconian family) =

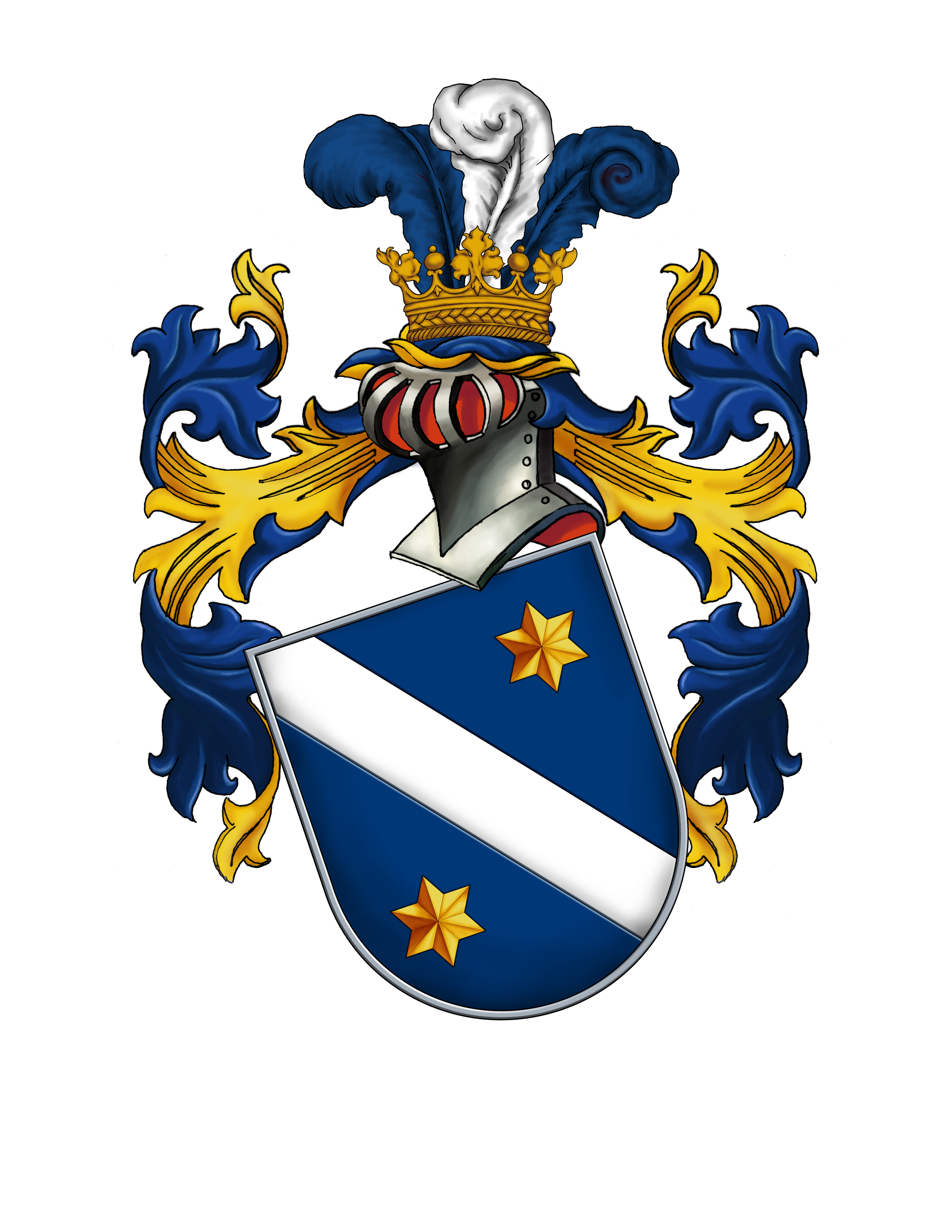
The Ritter von Weber arms.

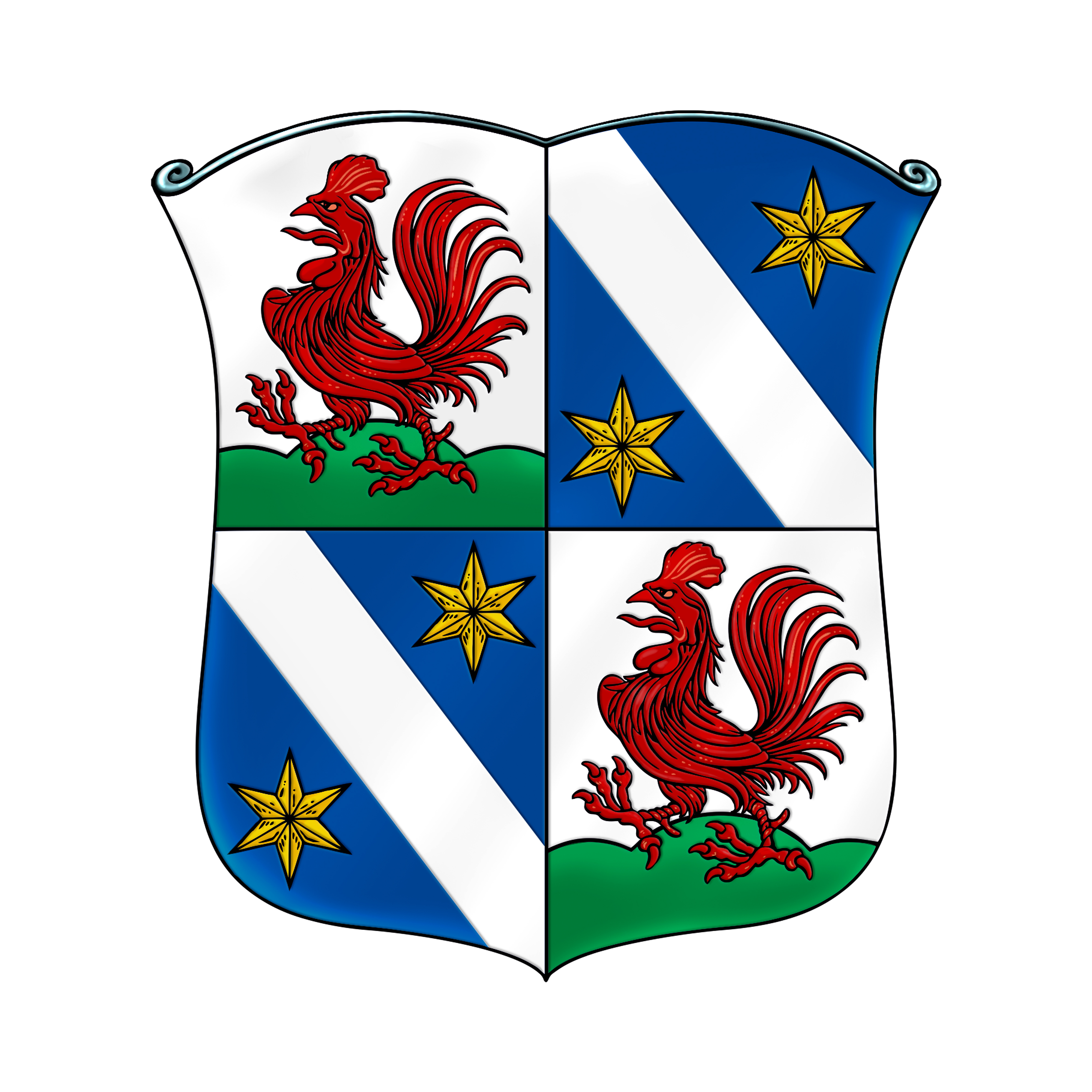
Arms of the Ritter von Weber-Hahnsberg

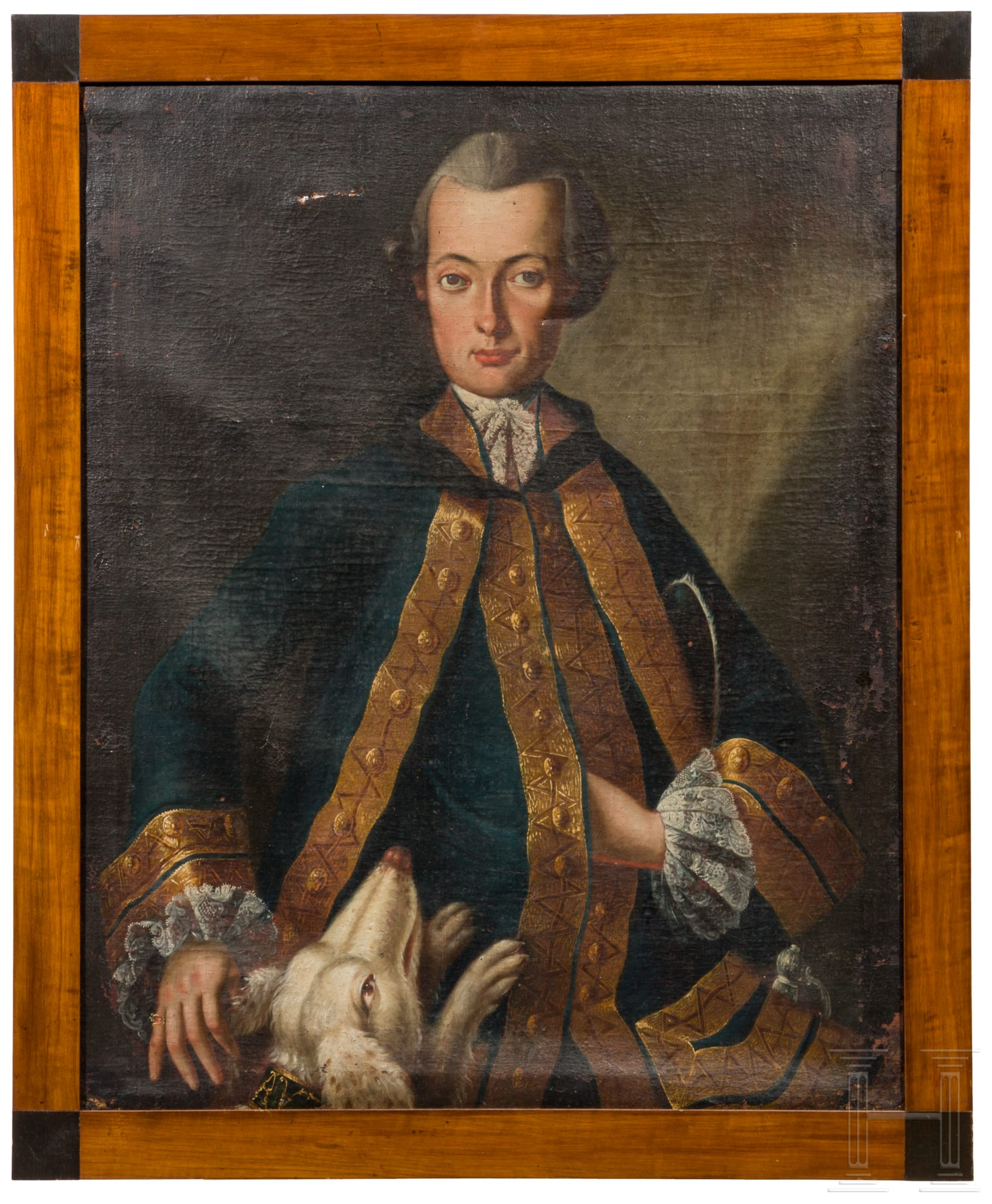
Friederich Weber c. 1683-1739

The Weber family is the name of a Catholic German noble family from Bavaria. Originating in Upper Franconia, the male line originates with Friedrich Weber (died 1739), huntsman of the Prince Bishop of Bamberg, as well as mayor of Marktleugast.

== Ennoblement ==
Personal knighthood upon being awarded the rank of Commander of the Order of Merit of the Bavarian Crown on 19 May 1808 for Georg Michael Weber, president of the Royal Bavarian Court of Appeals in Neuburg on the Danube, later Appeals Court vice president in Amberg, with matriculation among the knightly class in the Kingdom of Bavaria on 28 May 1813.

Bavarian hereditary nobility and knighthood (Ritter) on 30 April 1845 in Munich for his son Karl Weber, a royal Bavarian government secretary, 1st class in Augsburg with enrollment in the knightly class on 27 June 1845.

== Coat of arms ==
1813: Azure between two mullets or a bend argent. Mantling: gules and argent. Crest: five ostrich feathers, azure-or-or-or-azure.(See Genealogisches Handbuch des Adels, below.)

1845: Azure between two mullets or a bend argent. Mantling: azure and or. Crest: three ostrich feathers, azure-argent-azure.

The noted mathematician Eduard Ritter von Weber is a member of the family, branches of which can be found in America and Germany. Members have married into the aristocratic families of Chrustschoff (ancient Russian nobles) and von Hahnsberg.
