= Webber (surname) =

Webber is an English occupational surname meaning weaver.

== Etymology ==
Webber is an occupational surname referring to, "a maker of cloth". The ending "er" generally denotes some employment, examples include Miller and Salter. The ending "er" is the masculine form whilst "ster", as in Webster, is the feminine form.

Variants of the name include Weaver, Webbe, Webster and Weber, the German form of the name.

== Notable people with the surname Webber ==
- Aaron Webber (born 1989), Canadian actor
- Adeline Webber (fl. 2020s), Canadian politician from Yukon
- Alan Webber (born 1948), American politician from New Mexico
- Alason P. Webber (1828–1902), American musician and soldier
- Albert Raymond Forbes Webber (1880–1932), Trinidadian writer
- Amos R. Webber (1852–1948), American lawyer and politician from Ohio
- Anna Webber (disambiguation), several people
- Andrew Lloyd Webber (born 1948), British composer
- Angela Webber (1955–2007), Australian author, TV writer, producer and comedian
- Bernard Webber (disambiguation), several people
- Bonnie Webber (born 1946), computational linguist
- Brian Webber (born 1967), American actor
- Bryan Webber (born 1943), British physicist
- Cecil Edwin Webber (1909–1969), British television writer and playwright
- Chad Webber (born 1960), American actor
- Charles Webber (disambiguation), several people
- Chris Webber (disambiguation), multiple people
- Christopher Webber (born 1953), English actor
- Clyde M. Webber (1919–1976), American labor union leader
- Damien Webber (born 1968), English professional footballer
- Daniel Webber (disambiguation), several people
- Darren Webber (born 1981), Australian politician from New South Wales
- Darren Webber (cricketer) (born 1971), Australian cricketer
- David Webber (basketball) (born 1980), American basketball player
- Deb Webber, Australian psychic medium
- Diane Webber (1932–2008), American model and actress
- Donald W. Webber (1906–1995), justice of the Maine Supreme Judicial Court
- Douglas A. Webber (1901–1971), Canadian architect
- Dutch Webber (1901–1985), American football player
- Dyan Webber (born 1966), American sprinter
- Ebbert Webber (1921–2006), American writer
- Edmund Webber (1894–1966), Australian rules footballer
- Elizabeth Webber (disambiguation), multiple people
- Ellen Webber (1928–2003), Canadian politician and lawyer from Ontario
- Eric Webber (1919–1996), English footballer
- Ernest Berry Webber (1896–1963), British architect
- Evne Webber (born 1977), South African cricketer
- Faith Webber (born 2002), American soccer player
- Fernley Webber (1918–1991), British diplomat and former British High Commissioner to Brunei
- Francis Webber (1708–1771), Anglican priest and academic
- Fred Webber (1883–1966), Australian rules footballer
- Geoffrey Webber, British academic
- George W. Webber (politician) (1825–1900), American politician from Michigan
- Gordon Webber (disambiguation), several people
- Hamilton Webber, Australian composer
- Harry Webber (1936–2013), South African weightlifter
- Harry Webber (American football) (1892–1970), American football player
- Heather Webber, author of romance, mystery and paranormal novels
- Henry Webber, English sculptor and modeller
- Herbert John Webber (1865–1946), American plant physiologist
- Imogen Lloyd Webber (born 1977), British broadcaster, author and marketing & communications executive
- Jack Webber, Welsh spiritualist medium
- James Webber (disambiguation), multiple people
- Jamie Webber (born 1998), South African professional soccer player
- Jason Webber (born 1973), Australian rugby league footballer
- Jennifer Wynne Webber, Canadian writer, actor, dramaturge, journalist and television producer
- Joe Webber (born 1993), New Zealand rugby union player
- John Webber (disambiguation), multiple people
- Jordi Webber (born 1994), New Zealand actor and musician
- Josh Webber (born 1986), Canadian-American filmmaker, director, screenwriter and producer
- Jules C. Webber (1838–1872), American Civil War brevet brigadier general
- Julian Lloyd Webber (born 1951), British solo cellist, conductor, and broadcaster
- Kane Webber (born 1980), Australian professional golfer
- Keith Webber (1943–1983), Welsh footballer
- Len Webber (born 1960), Canadian politician from Alberta
- Les Webber (1915–1986), American baseball player
- Margareta Webber (1891–1983), Australian bookseller
- Mark Webber (disambiguation), several people
- Melinda Webber, New Zealand academic
- Melvin M. Webber (1920–2006), American urban designer and theorist
- Meredith Webber, Australian writer
- Michael Webber (disambiguation), several people
- Monty Webber (born 1961), Australian cinematographer
- Neil Webber (born 1936), Canadian politician from Alberta
- Nick Lloyd Webber (1979–2023), English composer and record producer
- Nina Webber (fl. 2020s), American politician from Wyoming
- Norman W. Webber (1881–1950), British Army staff officer
- Ollie Webber (born 2000), English footballer
- Pamela Balash-Webber (1953–2020), American diving instructor
- Peggy Webber (1925–2026), American actress
- Peter Webber (born 1968), British film director
- Raymond Webber (born 1989), American gridiron football player
- Rob Webber (born 1986), English rugby union player
- Robert Webber (1924–1989), American actor
- Robert E. Webber (1933–2007), American theologian
- Rod Webber, American musician and filmmaker
- Roy Webber (died 1962), British cricket scorer and statistician
- Roy L. Webber (1904–1975), American politician from Virginia
- Russell Webber (born 1967), American politician from Kentucky
- Ruth Webber (born 1965), Australian politician from Western Australia
- Samuel Webber (1759–1810), American clergyman, mathematician and academic
- Saskia Webber (born 1971), American soccer goalkeeper
- Seb Webber, British musician executive
- Sedric Webber (born 1977), American professional basketball player
- Sharon Webber (fl. 1970s), American surfer
- Sian Webber (born 1959), British actress
- Stacey Lee Webber (born 1982), American metalsmith
- Stephen Webber (disambiguation), multiple people
- Storme Webber, American two-spirit interdisciplinary artist, poet, curator, and educator
- Stuart Webber (born 1984), Welsh football director
- Sue Webber, Scottish politician
- Susan Webber (disambiguation), several people
- Tammara Webber, American novelist
- Teresa Webber (fl. 1990s–2020s), British palaeographer, medievalist, and academic
- Tim Webber (born 1964), British artist
- Timothy Webber, Canadian television, film and stage actor
- Vic Webber (1906–2005), Australian rugby league footballer
- Wade Webber (born 1967), American soccer player
- Walter Webber (fl. 1810s–1830s), Western Cherokee leader and trader, founder of present-day Webbers Falls, Oklahoma
- Wesley Webber, American painter
- William Webber (disambiguation), several people

== See also ==
- Lloyd Webber, a surname
- Paine Webber, an American company
- Weber (surname)
