= Cape Meares National Wildlife Refuge =

Wildlife refuge in Oregon, United States

- IUCN category IV (habitat/species management area)
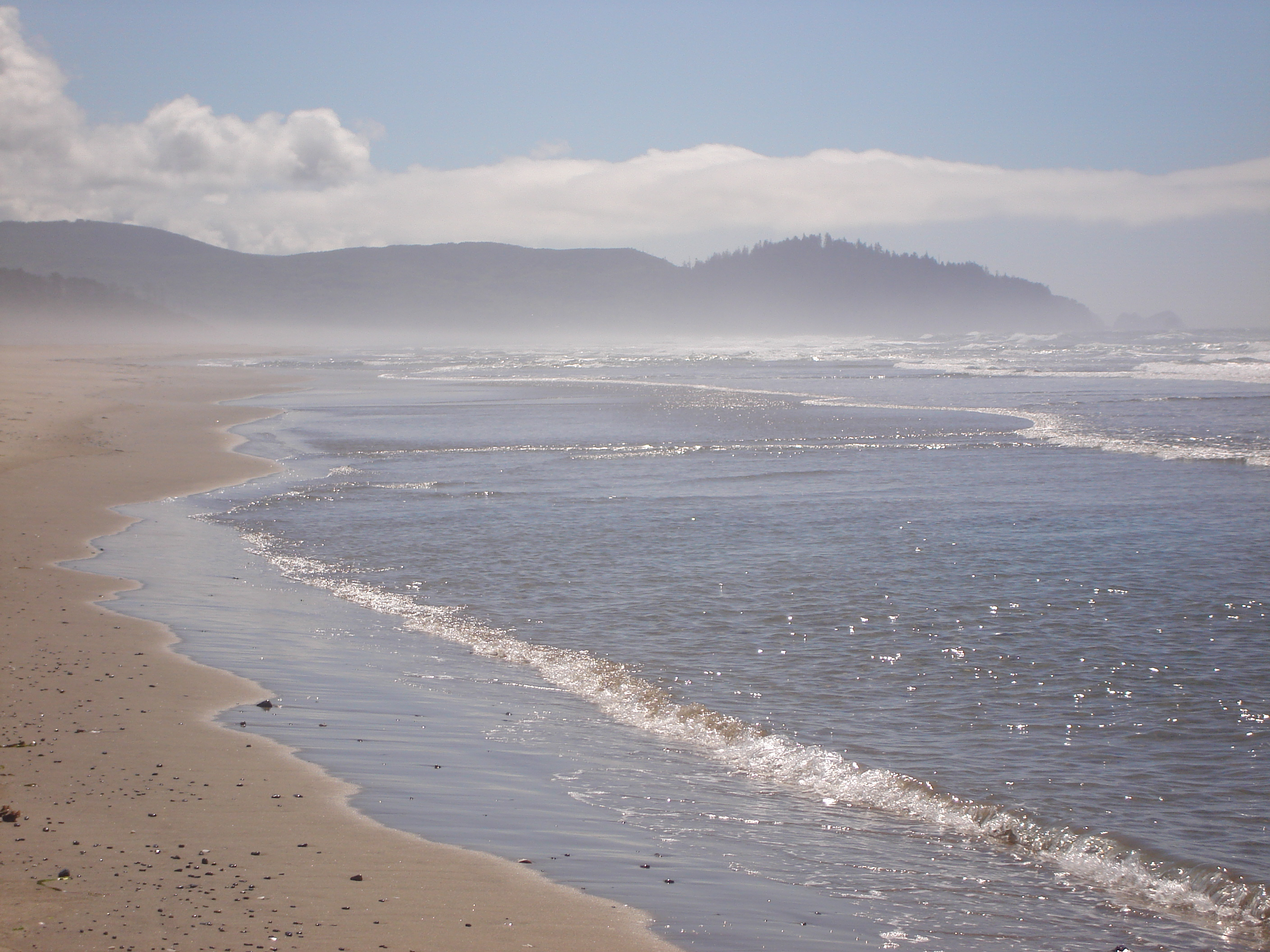
- Cape Meares as seen from nearby beach

- Location within Oregon Location within the United States
- Location: Tillamook County, Oregon, USA
- Nearest city: Cape Meares
- Coordinates: 45.4873248°N 123.9637426°W
- Area: 138.51 acres (56 ha)
- Established: 1938
- Governing body: U.S. Fish and Wildlife Service
- Website: Cape Meares NWR

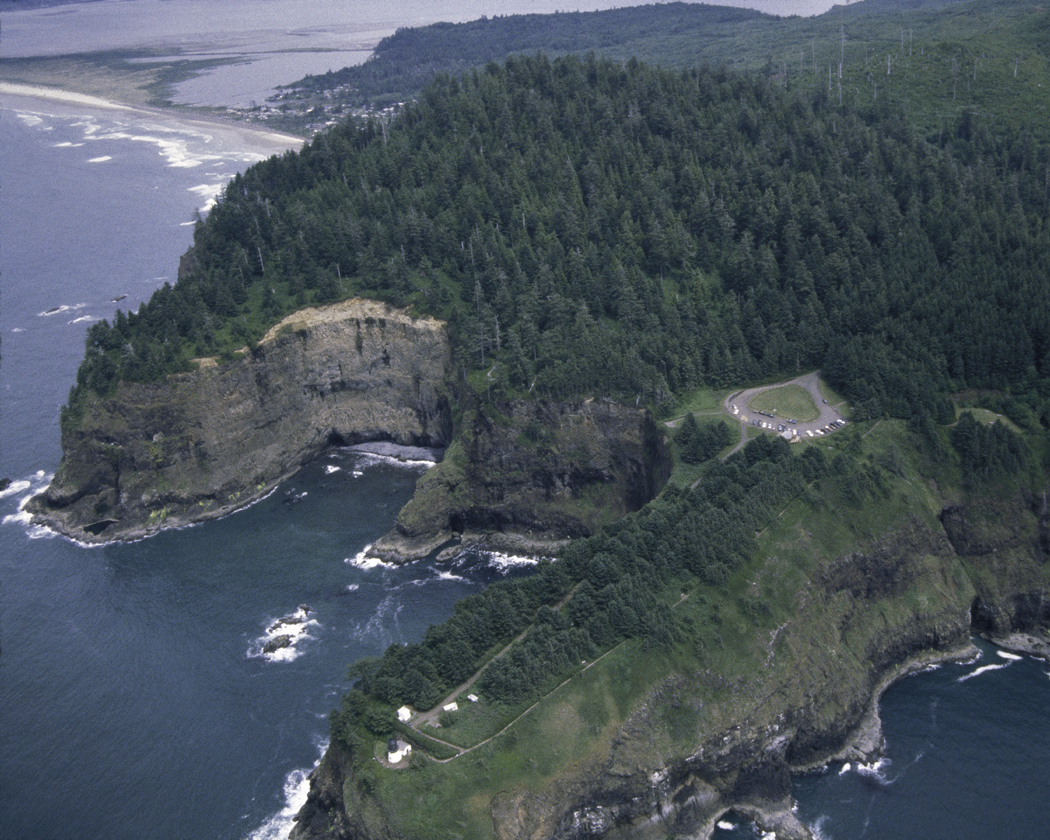
Aerial view of Cape Meares National Wildlife Refuge

Cape Meares National Wildlife Refuge is a National Wildlife Refuge of the Oregon Coast. It is one of six National Wildlife Refuges in the Oregon Coast National Wildlife Refuge Complex. Located on Cape Meares, the refuge was established in 1938 to protect a remnant of coastal old-growth forest and the surrounding habitat used by breeding seabirds. The area provides a home for a threatened bird species, the marbled murrelets. Peregrine falcons, once at the brink of extinction, have nested here since 1987. The refuge, with the exception of the Oregon Coast Trail, was designated a Research Natural Area in 1987.

The Cape Meares Light, which marked the cape at night from 1890 until 1963, is now open to the public. Three Arch Rocks National Wildlife Refuge and Oregon Islands National Wildlife Refuge are easily seen from the cape. It is the only point in the United States from which three refuges can be seen at the same time.

== Wildlife viewing ==
The Oregon Coast Trail passes through the center of this headland and interpretive displays along the trail describe the varied wildlife. From this trail, it is possible to see migrating gray whales, three species of scoters, western grebes, and common loons. A wildlife viewing deck, part of the Cape Meares State Scenic Viewpoint, provides views of the refuge's sea cliffs and inshore islands. In season, visitors can see the aerie of a nesting peregrine falcon pair. Each spring thousands of seabirds return to nest on the cliffs. Species that can be seen are brants, pelagic cormorants, common murres, tufted puffins, pigeon guillemots, western gulls, and black oystercatchers. This state park has 3 miles (4.8 km) of hiking trails and a 1-mile (1.6 km) walking trail through the forest of sitka spruce and western hemlock.

== The Cape Meares Giant ==
Some of the trees on the refuge are hundreds of years old and more than 200 feet (61 m) tall. The Cape Meares Giant, a sitka spruce, is of special interest. After the Great Coastal Gale of 2007 killed the Klootchy Creek Giant, once considered the largest sitka spruce in the world, the U.S. Fish and Wildlife Service (FWS) granted a special use permit to Ascending the Giants, a Portland based organization, which allowed them to climb and measure the Cape Meares Giant. Based on the results, the FWS issued a press release in February 2008 that announced that the tree is the largest known Sitka spruce in the state and that it was designated an Oregon Heritage Tree. Oregon's actual largest Sitka Spruce, using a point system, is Falcon's Tower, discovered and measured by Certified Arborist M. D. Vaden. Cape Meares Giant Spruce had only 743 points, whereas Falcon's Tower was documented at 750 points by M. D. Vaden. Falcon's Tower is in Oswald West State Park, between Cannon Beach and Manzanita, Oregon.

== See also ==
- List of National Wildlife Refuges
