= Lloyd Webber (surname) =

The name Lloyd Webber and Lloyd-Webber, composite of a surname of two barrels, may refer to:

- William Lloyd Webber (1914–1982), English organist and composer
- Andrew Lloyd Webber, Baron Lloyd-Webber (born 1948), son of William, English composer of musical theatre
- Julian Lloyd Webber (born 1951), son of William and brother of Andrew, English cellist
- Imogen Lloyd Webber (born 1978), daughter of Andrew, English theatre producer
- Nicholas Lloyd Webber (1979–2023), son of Andrew, English composer and music producer

== See also ==
- Lloyd (surname)
- Webber (surname)
