= Newman School =

Newman School may refer to:

United Kingdom

- The John Henry Newman School - Hertfordshire, England

United States

- The Newman School - Boston, Massachusetts
- Isidore Newman School - New Orleans, Louisiana

== See also ==
- Cardinal Newman (disambiguation) for any school named after Cardinal Newman
