= Oregon Coast National Wildlife Refuge Complex =

The Oregon Coast National Wildlife Refuge Complex consists of six National Wildlife Refuges along the Oregon Coast. It provides wilderness protection to thousands of small islands, rocks, reefs, headlands, marshes, and bays totaling 371 acres (150 ha) spanning 320 miles (515 km) of Oregon's coastline. The areas are all managed by the United States Fish and Wildlife Service.

The six National Wildlife Refuges—three marine, and three estuarine—are from Tillamook Head south to the California-Oregon border. The marine refuges are Three Arch Rocks, Oregon Islands, and Cape Meares. The estuarine are Bandon Marsh, Nestucca Bay, and Siletz Bay. Except for Tillamook Rock Light and its surrounding 1-acre (4,000 m^{2}) rock, all the islands are closed to public access. Boats must remain at least 500 ft (150 m) away, and aircraft must maintain at least 2,000 ft (610 m) clearance.

== Three Arch Rocks National Wildlife Refuge ==
Three Arch Rocks National Wildlife Refuge was the first National Wildlife Refuge west of the Mississippi River. The refuge has provided protection for Oregon's largest seabird nesting colony of more 230,000 birds since October 14, 1907.

Three Arch Rocks consists of 15 acres (6 ha) in three large and six small rocks located about a half mile (1 km) offshore from Oceanside. It is one of the smallest designated wilderness areas in the U.S., but features the largest colony of breeding tufted puffins and the largest common murre colony south of Alaska. It is the only northern Oregon pupping site for the threatened Steller sea lion.

The refuge was established by President Theodore Roosevelt after being persuaded by two young conservationists, William L. Finley and Herman Bohlman, who studied and photographed Three Arch Rocks from Oceanside beginning in 1901. They recorded hunters killing dozens of sea lions at a time for skin and oil, and sportsmen shooting seabirds purely for sport. Due to a scarcity of regional chicken farms at the time, seabird eggs were priced at up to a dollar per dozen, encouraging egg harvesting and reducing the bird colony population. Finley and Bohlman suggested a wildlife refuge to Roosevelt for protecting dwindling populations and ensure survival of seabird and marine mammal populations. Roosevelt declared the refuge in 1907.

== Oregon Islands National Wildlife Refuge ==
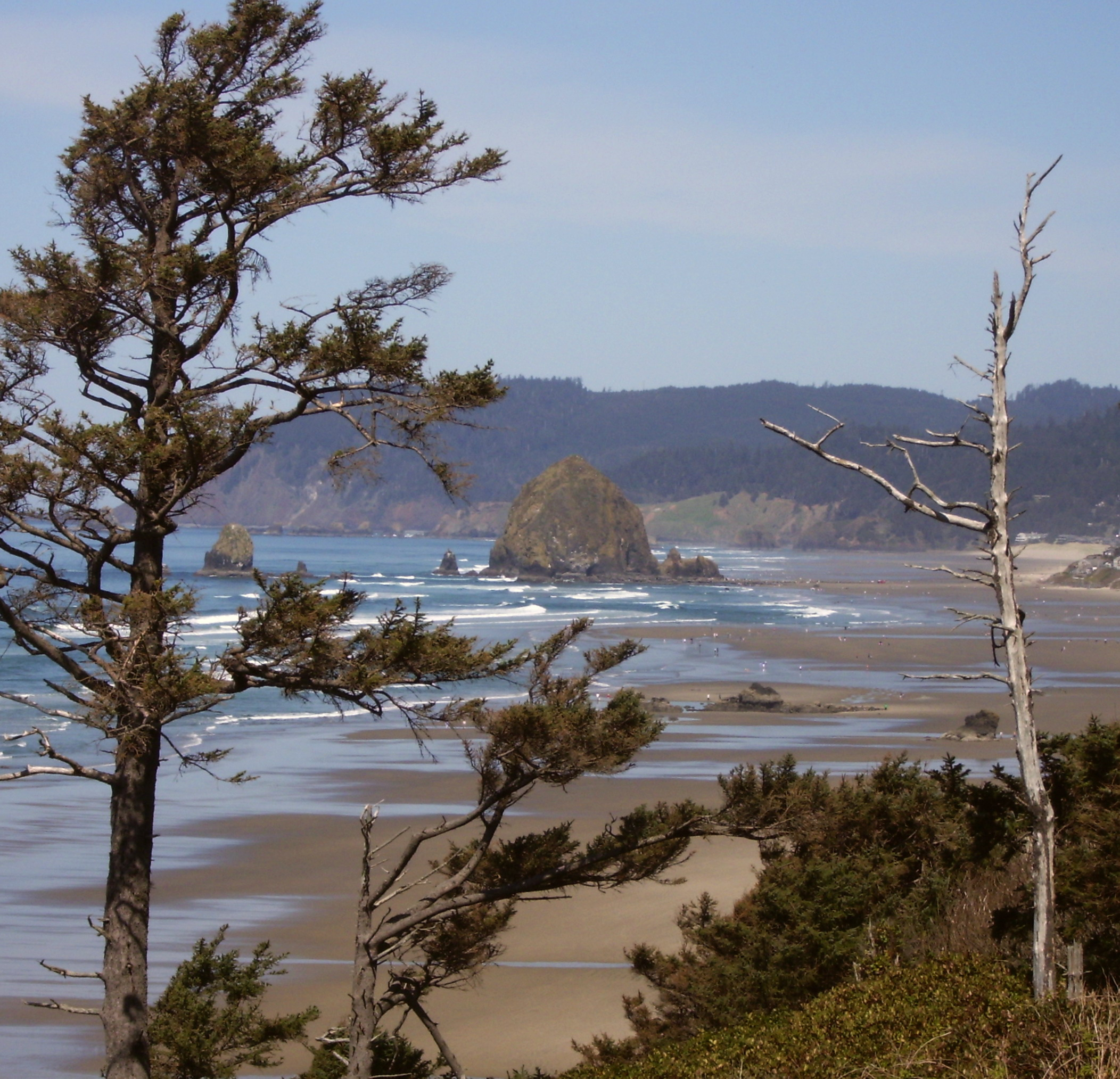
Haystack Rock near Cannon Beach

Oregon Islands National Wildlife Refuge provides Wilderness Act protection to 1,853 small islands, rocks, and reefs plus two headlands, totaling 371 acres (150 ha) spanning 320 miles (515 km) of Oregon's coastline from the Oregon-California border to Tillamook Head.

The Oregon Islands National Wildlife Refuge was created in 1935. Haystack Rock off Cannon Beach was added to the refuge in 1968, which became a wilderness area in 1978. The first mainland addition to the refuge came in 1991 when Coquille Point near Bandon was added.

It is a sanctuary for nesting seabirds of thirteen species—some of the most important nesting seabird colonies in the U.S. Over 1.2 million individuals nest in colonies here, more than on the California and Washington coasts combined. The most prevalent species are black-and-white common murres, tufted puffins, rhinoceros and Cassin's auklets, pigeon guillemots, Leach's storm-petrels, several species of gulls, and Caspian terns.

Four species of pinniped breed, molt, and rest on these lands, including harbor seals, Steller and California sea lions. The southern portion of the refuge provides the greatest number of breeding and pupping sites for Steller sea lions in the U.S. outside Alaska.

Good viewing is possible from Coquille Point in Bandon and other locations suggested by the Oregon Coast Birding Trail.

== Cape Meares National Wildlife Refuge ==
Cape Meares National Wildlife Refuge protects one of the last remaining coastal old growth forests.

This Oregon refuge set on Cape Meares has provided protection since 1938 for Sitka spruce and western hemlock, some more than 200 feet (60 m) tall and hundreds of years old. The conditions are ideal habitat for several threatened bird species, including bald eagles and peregrine falcons—the latter once at the brink of extinction. A pair of peregrine falcons has resided here since 1987.

The Oregon Coast Trail passes through the center of this headland refuge where interpretive displays describe its many inhabitants. It is possible to see migrating gray whales, three types of scoter, western grebe, and common loons. A wildlife viewing deck provides a seasonal view into the aerie of a falcon pair.

Three Arch Rocks National Wildlife Refuge and Oregon Islands National Wildlife Refuge are easily seen from the cape. Also, Cape Meares Light, and an Oregon state park are adjacent.

== Bandon Marsh National Wildlife Refuge ==
Bandon Marsh National Wildlife Refuge is renowned among bird watchers for being able to view rare shorebirds including ruff, Hudsonian godwit, and Mongolian plover.

Last expanded in 1999, it now has 889 acres (360 ha) in two units: Bandon Marsh and Ni-les'tun.

Bandon Marsh is popular for hunting, fishing, clamming, birding and photography. The refuge protects the largest tidal salt marsh in the Coquille River estuary. The mudflats are rich in clam, crab, worm, and shrimp and attracts migrating shorebirds, waterfowl, coho salmon, as well as the California brown pelican. More common shorebird species include western and least sandpiper, semipalmated plover, black-bellied plover, Pacific golden plover, red phalarope, whimbrel, dunlin.

The Ni-les'tun unit is a habitat restoration project which will eventually benefit fish and wildlife. In consists of intertidal and freshwater marsh, and riparian land. It also protects a 4,500-year-old Native American archaeological site of the Coquille Indian Tribe.

There are several overlooks, as well as access for hunters, birders, fisherman, and clammers. State and federal regulations are in effect.

The marsh is located just north of Bandon, on the east side of the Coquille river across from Bullards Beach State Park.

== Nestucca Bay National Wildlife Refuge ==
Nestucca Bay National Wildlife Refuge supports one tenth of the world's dusky Canada goose population. The refuge contains at least seven types of habitat, including tidal marsh, tidal mudflats, grassland, woodland, pasture, forested lagg—a transition between raised peat bog and mineral soil—and freshwater bogs, including the southernmost coastal sphagnum bog habitat on the Pacific Coast.

The sphagnum bog provides habitat for a large diversity species, such as the insect-eating sundew plant and the bog cranberry. Scientists have discovered layers of sand and peat under Neskowin Marsh indicating a long history of tsunami activity which carries sand from the coastal sand dunes. These might be the best record of tsunami activity within the Cascadia subduction zone.

The refuge was established in 1991, and is located on Nestucca Bay at the confluence of the Nestucca and Little Nestucca rivers, ranging 3 to 5 miles (5 to 8 km) south of Pacific City. Across the bay to the west is Nestucca Spit and Robert W. Straub state parks.

The refuge is closed to all public use, except during two special events: one in February and one in October. A viewing area is planned for construction, probably in 2008.

== Siletz Bay National Wildlife Refuge ==
Siletz Bay National Wildlife Refuge was established in 1991 primarily to return salt marsh to its natural state. Formerly it had been diked and crossed with ditches to create pasture for dairy cow grazing. More than 9,300 ft (2.8 km) of dikes were removed and a quarter mile (500 m) of ditch were filled to initiate restoration. Salt-starched skeleton trees are visible along both sides of U.S. Route 101 (which runs through the refuge) from the time when the salt marsh was diked. Red-tailed hawks and bald eagles are often visible roosting on these snags. Abundant great blue heron and great egret live nearby.

The refuge is located on Siletz Bay, immediately south of Lincoln City where the Siletz River enters the bay. It is closed to all public use, except during special events.

== See also ==
- Pacific Flyway
- Important Bird Area
- List of National Wildlife Refuges#Oregon
- Siletz Reef
