= Steven Weber (disambiguation) =

Steven Weber (born 1961) is an American actor.

Steven or Stephen Weber is also the name of:

- Steven Weber (professor) (born 1961), professor at the University of California, Berkeley, studying open source
- Steve Weber (1943–2020), American musician
- Stephen G. Weber, American professor at the University of Pittsburgh

== See also ==
- Stephen Weber
- Stephen Webber (disambiguation)
