= Liquid Time =

- Directed by: Monty Webber, Greg Webber
- Release date: 2002
- Running time: 20 minutes

Liquid Time is a 2002 avant-garde surf film that focuses solely on the fluid forms of tubing waves. Brothers Monty Webber and Greg Webber revived a childhood passion for perfectly formed tiny waves by filming the wake of their runabout as it pealed along the edge of a river sandbank. The 20-minute film received the Cinematography Award at the Saint Jean de Luz Surf Film Festival (2004 Edition).

== Quotes from the DVD cover ==
- "Mind-boggling! I must say I don't think I've seen a film that is so beautiful. If there were Academy Awards given out for photography, editing, concept and music in the surfing arena, Liquid Time would take the lot." Alby Falzon
- "Fascinating! Those microwaves break new ground in surf film. The music, the complete camera techniques. A superb job." George Greenough
- "Damn it, man. You've made something so beautiful." Jack McCoy
- "It's hypnotically fascinating. The slow movements of the lip coming down are just mesmerizing." Paul Witzig
