= Newman Catholic High School =

Newman Catholic High School may refer to:

- Newman Catholic High School (Mason City, Iowa)
- Newman Catholic High School (Wausau, Wisconsin)

== See also ==
- Cardinal Newman (disambiguation) – includes several high schools
