= Tillamook Rock Light =

Lighthouse in Oregon, United States

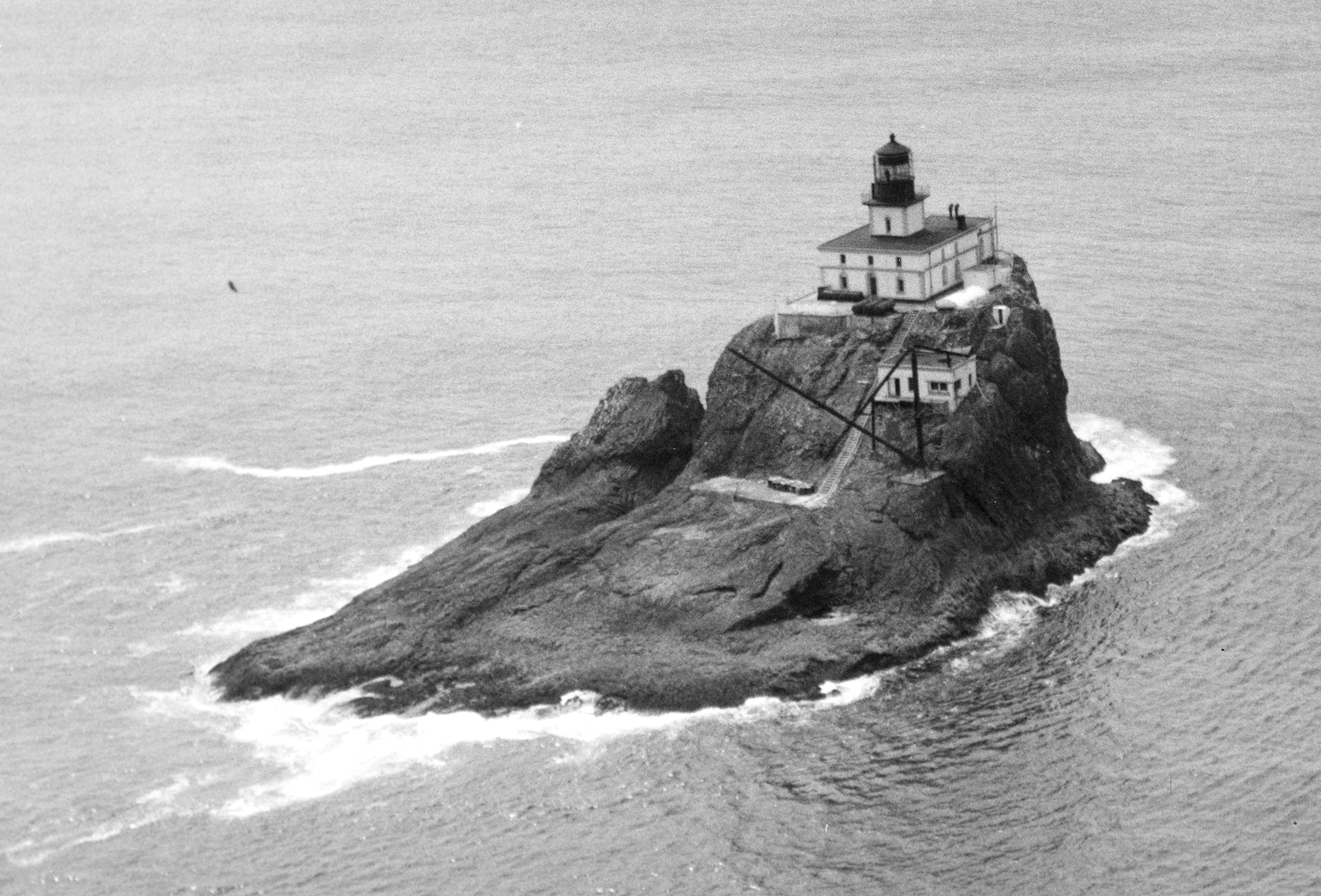
- As seen in 1947
- Location: Tillamook Rock, Clatsop County, United States
- Coordinates: 45°56′15″N 124°01′08″W

Tower
- Construction: concrete (foundation), basalt (tower), brick (tower), iron (tower)
- Height: 62 ft (19 m)
- Shape: square (tower), round (lantern)
- Heritage: National Register of Historic Places listed place

Light
- First lit: 21 January 1881
- Deactivated: 1957
- Focal height: 133 ft (41 m)
- Lens: first order Fresnel lens
- Range: 18 nmi (33 km; 21 mi)
- Tillamook Rock Lighthouse
- U.S. National Register of Historic Places
- NRHP reference No.: 81000480
- Added to NRHP: December 9, 1981

Tillamook Rock Light (known locally as Terrible Tilly or just Tilly) is a deactivated lighthouse on the northern Oregon Coast of the United States. It is located approximately 1.2 miles (1.9 km) offshore from Tillamook Head, and 20 miles (32 km) south of the mouth of the Columbia River near Astoria, situated on less than an acre of basalt rock in the Pacific Ocean. The construction of the lighthouse was commissioned in 1878 by the United States Congress and took more than 500 days to complete. Shortly before the completion of the lighthouse in January 1881, the barque Lupatia was wrecked near the rock during foggy weather and sank, with the loss of all 16 crew members. Only the ship's dog was saved.

Tillamook Rock Light was officially lit on January 21, 1881. At the time, it was the most expensive lighthouse to be built on the West Coast. Due to the local erratic weather conditions, and the dangerous commute for both keepers and suppliers, the lighthouse earned the nicknamed "Terrible Tilly" (or "Tillie"). Over the years, storms and the sea have damaged the structure, shattered the lens, and eroded the rock. The light was decommissioned in 1957, and has since been sold several times to private buyers. Since the 1980s it functioned as a columbarium until 1999. Today the lighthouse remains privately owned. Tillamook Rock Light is listed in the National Register of Historic Places, and is part of the Oregon Islands National Wildlife Refuge. The lighthouse is visible from the coastal cities of Seaside and Cannon Beach, as well as from Ecola State Park.

== Construction ==
In 1878, the United States Congress appropriated $50,000 for a lighthouse to be built on Tillamook Head; however, after a survey was conducted, it was determined that due to the approximately 1,000 feet (300 m) height of the Head, the light would be obstructed by fog, and the Tillamook rock was selected as the alternative site for the construction. A survey of the rock was ordered in 1879, which was headed by H. S. Wheeler and his cutter Thomas Corwin. Wheeler's initial assessment determined that access to the rock was severely limited, if not impossible, but was ordered to continue. During his second assessment, he was able to land on the rock, but was unable to move his survey equipment without the use of a tape line. He then relayed that the rock would need considerable blasting to create a level area in order to lay down a foundation for the lighthouse, and that more money was going to be needed to complete the project.

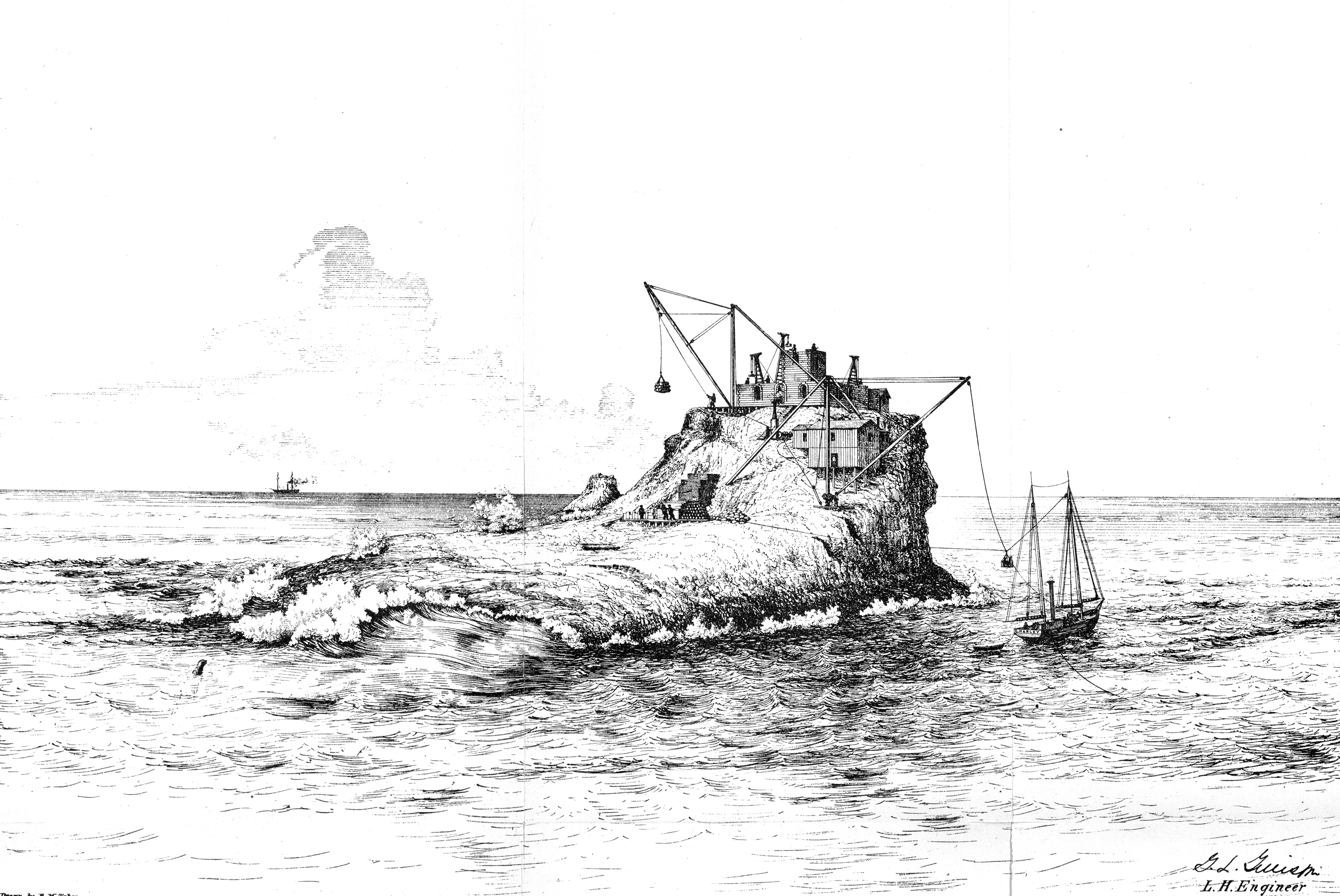
Illustration of the lighthouse under construction

In September 1879, a third survey was ordered, this time headed by John Trewavas, whose experience included the Wolf Rock lighthouse in England. Trewavas was overtaken by large swells and was swept into the sea while attempting a landing, and his body was never recovered. His replacement, Charles A. Ballantyne, had a difficult assignment recruiting workers due to the widespread negative reaction to Trewavas' death, and a general desire by the public to end the project. Ballantyne was eventually able to secure a group of quarrymen who knew nothing of the tragedy, and was able to resume work on the rock. Transportation to and from the rock involved the use of a derrick line attached with a breeches buoy, and in May 1880, they were able to completely blast the top of the rock to allow the construction of the lighthouse's foundation.

The structure of the lighthouse included an attached keeper's quarters and a 62-foot (19 m) tower that originally housed a first-order Fresnel lens, with an incandescent oil vapor lamp, 133 feet (41 m) above sea level. The light had a visibility range of 18 miles (29 km), and was fixed with a steam foghorn. It is located on less than an acre of basalt in the Pacific Ocean, 20 miles (32 km) south of the mouth of the Columbia River, approximately 1.2 miles (1.9 km) off Tillamook Head, and is the northernmost lighthouse along the Oregon coast. The construction lasted more than 500 days by the U.S. Army Corps of Engineers under the leadership of George Lewis Gillespie Jr. The cost of $125,000, at the time (equivalent to $4.17 million today), was the most expensive West Coast lighthouse ever built, later surpassed by the St. George Reef Light off the northern California coast.

=== The wreck of the Lupatia ===
In early January 1881, when the lighthouse was near completion, the barque Lupatia was sailing in thick fog and high winds when the ship's Captain noticed that they were too close to shore. Wheeler, the official in charge of the lighthouse's construction, heard the voices of the panicked crew and immediately ordered his men to place lanterns in the tower and light a bonfire to signal the ship that they were approximately 600 feet (180 m) from the rock. The ship appeared to have been able to turn itself toward returning to sea. However, it quickly disappeared into the fog, and Wheeler was not able to hear the crew. The next day, the bodies of all 16 crew members were found washed up on shore of Tillamook Head. The only survivor of the wreck was the crew's dog.

== Operational era ==
The beacon was first lit on January 21, 1881, and was assigned with four keepers. Duty at the Tillamook Light was considered difficult due to the isolation from civilization, and the severe weather conditions. The light was nicknamed "Terrible Tilly" (or "Tillie"), for the frequent stormy conditions of its location. Throughout its history, the area was hit by large, violent storms that damaged the lighthouse with large waves, winds, and debris, and on several occasions, the tower was flooded after the lantern room windows were broken by large debris. The lighthouse had four head keepers during its first two years and in 1897, a telephone line was installed, though a storm cut it shortly afterwards. During a storm in 1912, 100 tons of rock were reportedly shorn off the western end of the rock, and the windows were eventually cemented over and replaced by small portholes.

On October 21, 1934, the original fresnel lens was destroyed by a large storm that also leveled parts of the tower railing and greatly damaged the landing platform. Winds had reached 109 miles per hour (175 km/h), launching boulders and debris into the tower, damaging the lantern room and destroying the lens. The derrick and phone lines were destroyed as well. After the storm subsided, communication with the lighthouse was severed until keeper Henry Jenkins built a makeshift radio from the damaged foghorn and telephone to alert officials. Diesel engines were installed to provide electricity for the light and station. Repairs to the lighthouse cost $12,000 and were not fully completed until February 1935. The Fresnel lens was replaced by an aerobeacon, and a metal mesh placed around the lantern room to protect the tower from large boulders.

== Post-operational era ==
The lighthouse was decommissioned in 1957 and replaced with a whistle buoy, having become the most expensive U.S. lighthouse to operate. The last keeper was Oswald Allik, who would later become the last head keeper of Heceta Head Light. During the next twenty years, the lighthouse changed ownership several times; in 1980 a group of realtors purchased the lighthouse and created the Eternity at Sea Columbarium, which opened in June of that year. After interring about 30 urns, the columbarium's license was revoked in 1999 by the Oregon Mortuary and Cemetery Board and was rejected upon reapplication in 2005.

Access to the lighthouse is severely limited, with a helicopter landing the only practical way to access the rock, and it is off-limits even to the owners during the seabird nesting season. The structure was listed on the National Register of Historic Places in 1981 and is part of the Oregon Islands National Wildlife Refuge. The lighthouse's rock is now frequently visited by thousands of sea lions, seals, and sea birds.

In April 2022, Eternity at Sea announced that the property was for sale. The buildings were said to be in need of complete renovation due to damage from storms, nesting birds and sea lions.

== Gallery ==
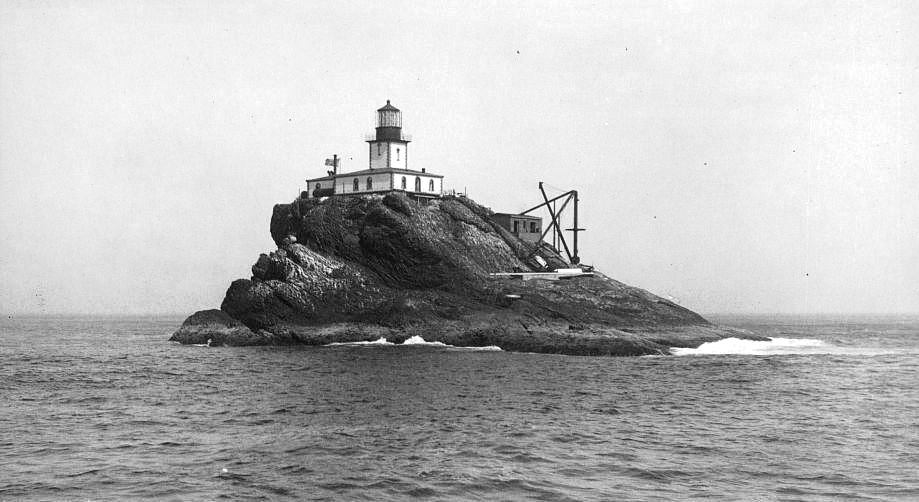
Tillamook Rock Light in 1891

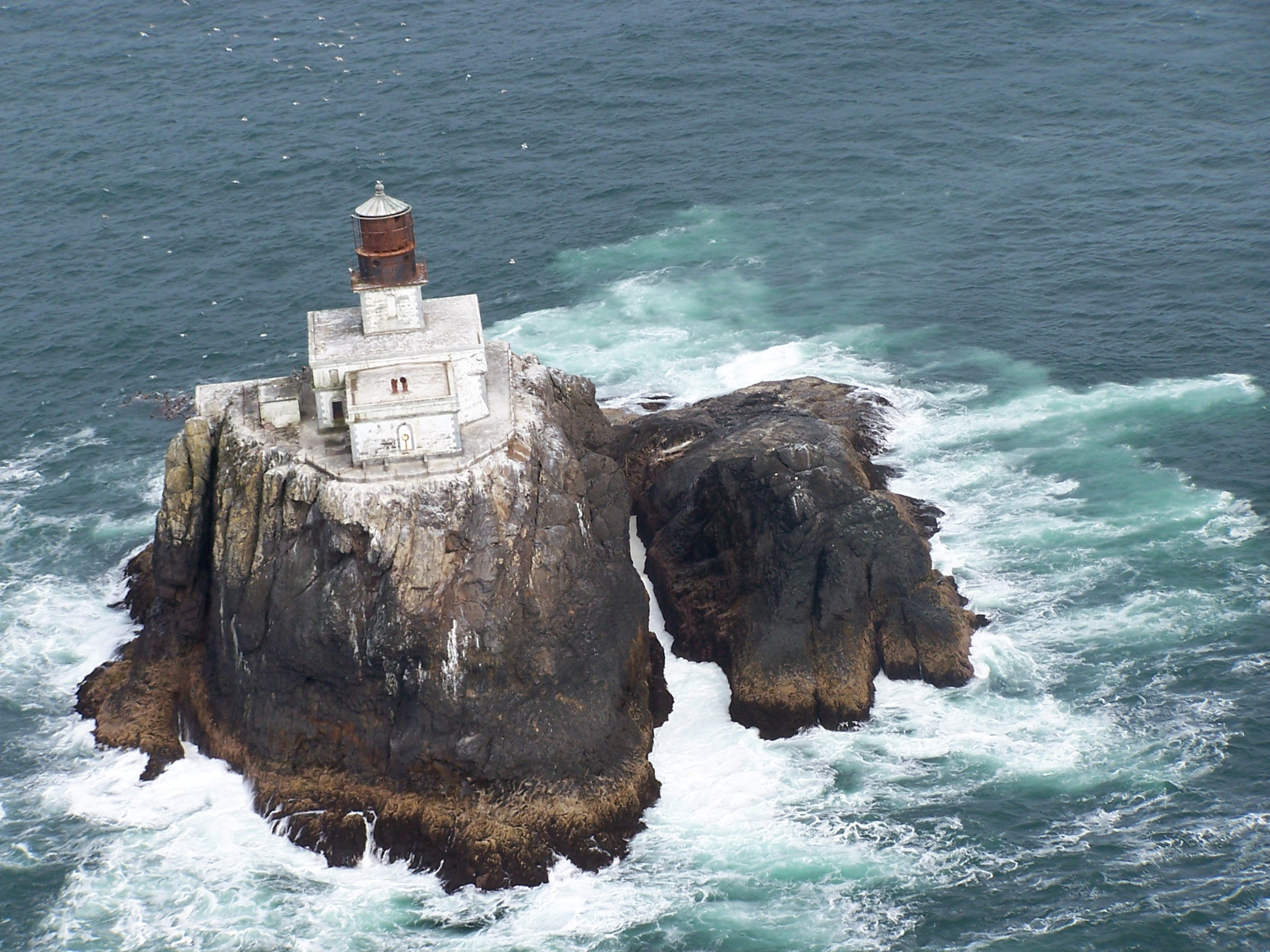
Tillamook Rock Light

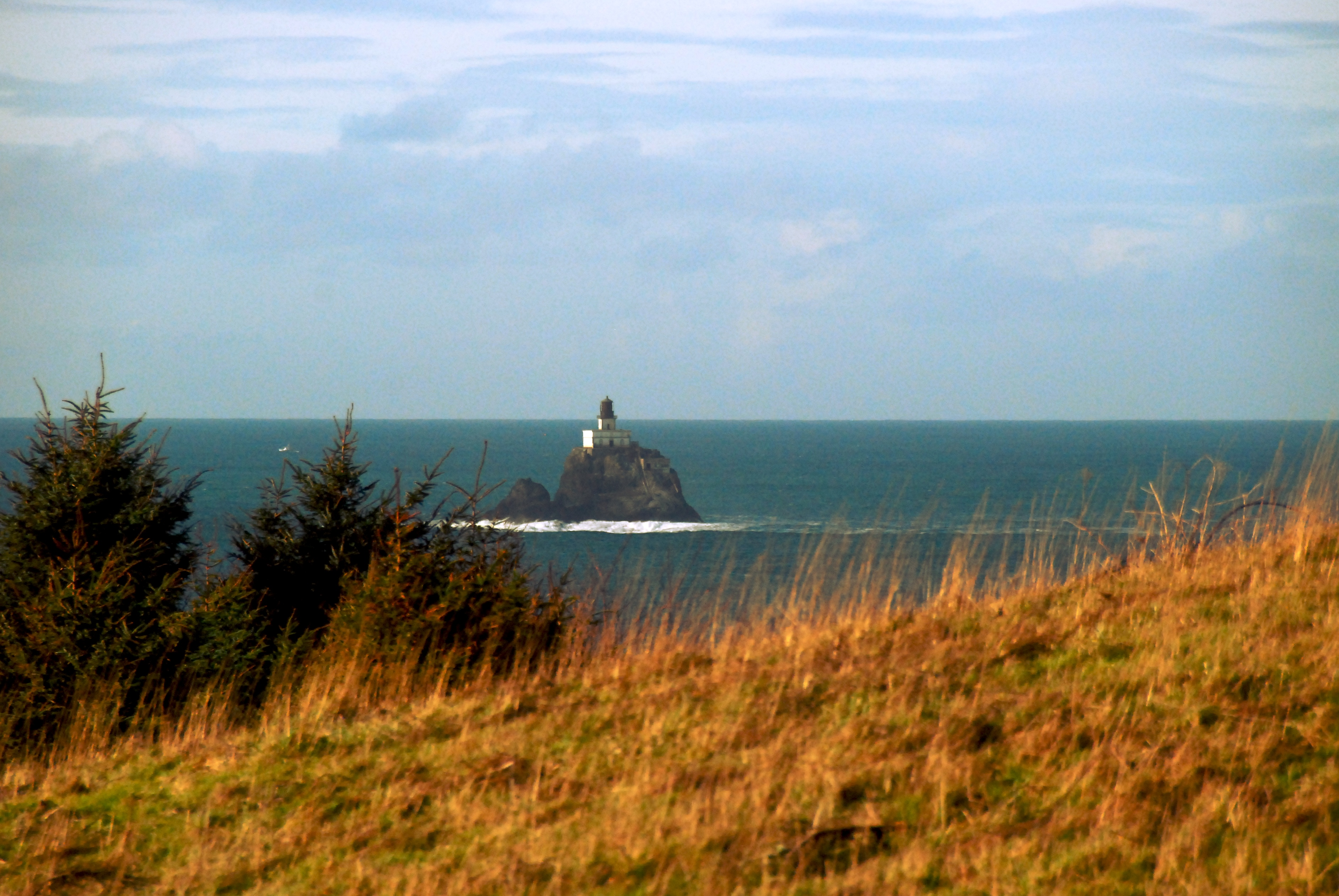
Tillamook Rock light station in 2010

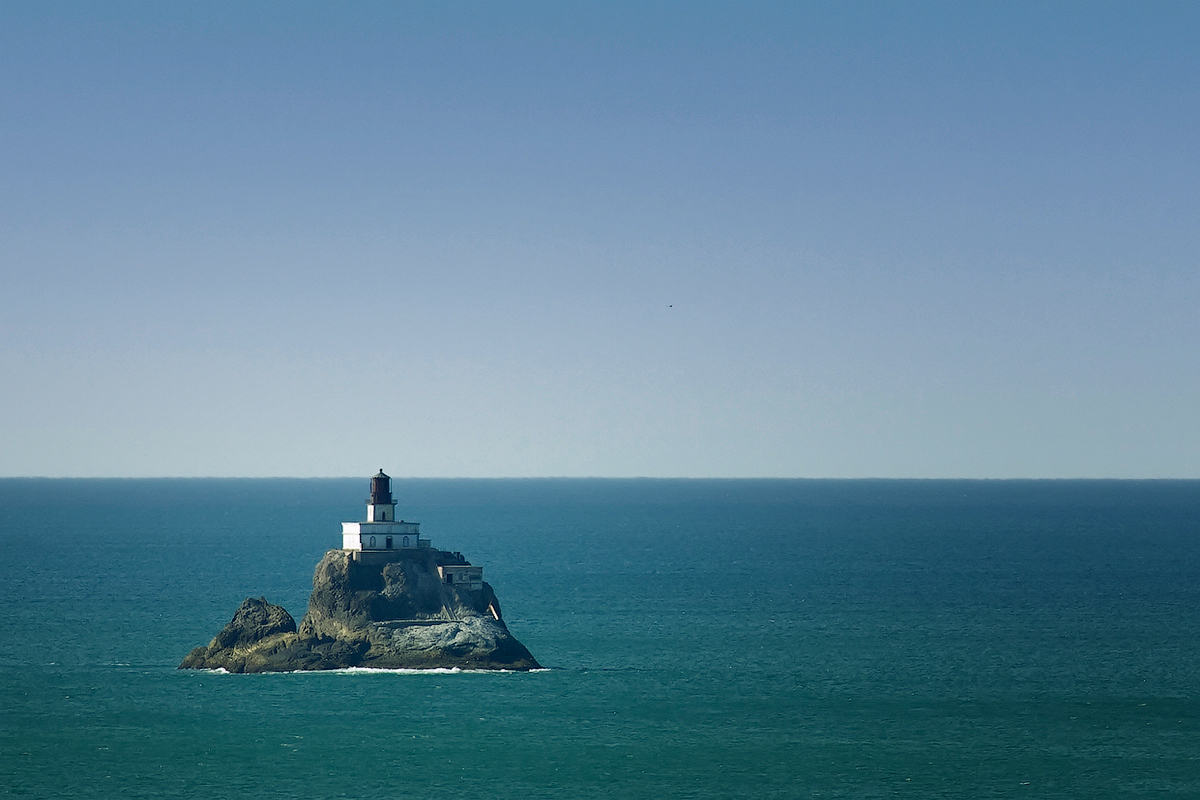
2010

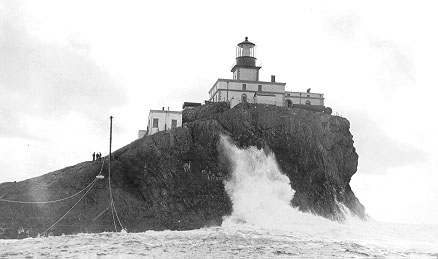

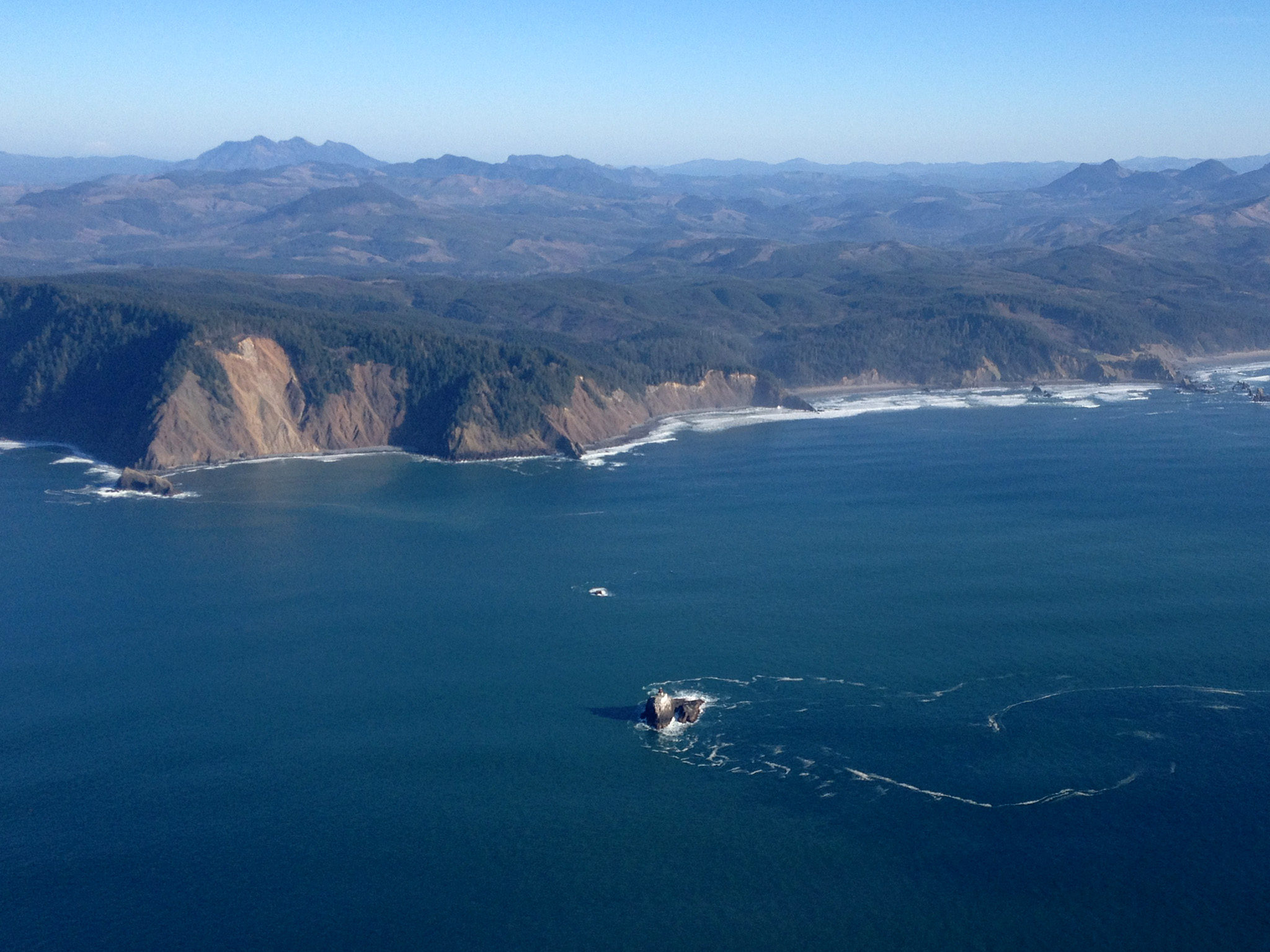
January 2014

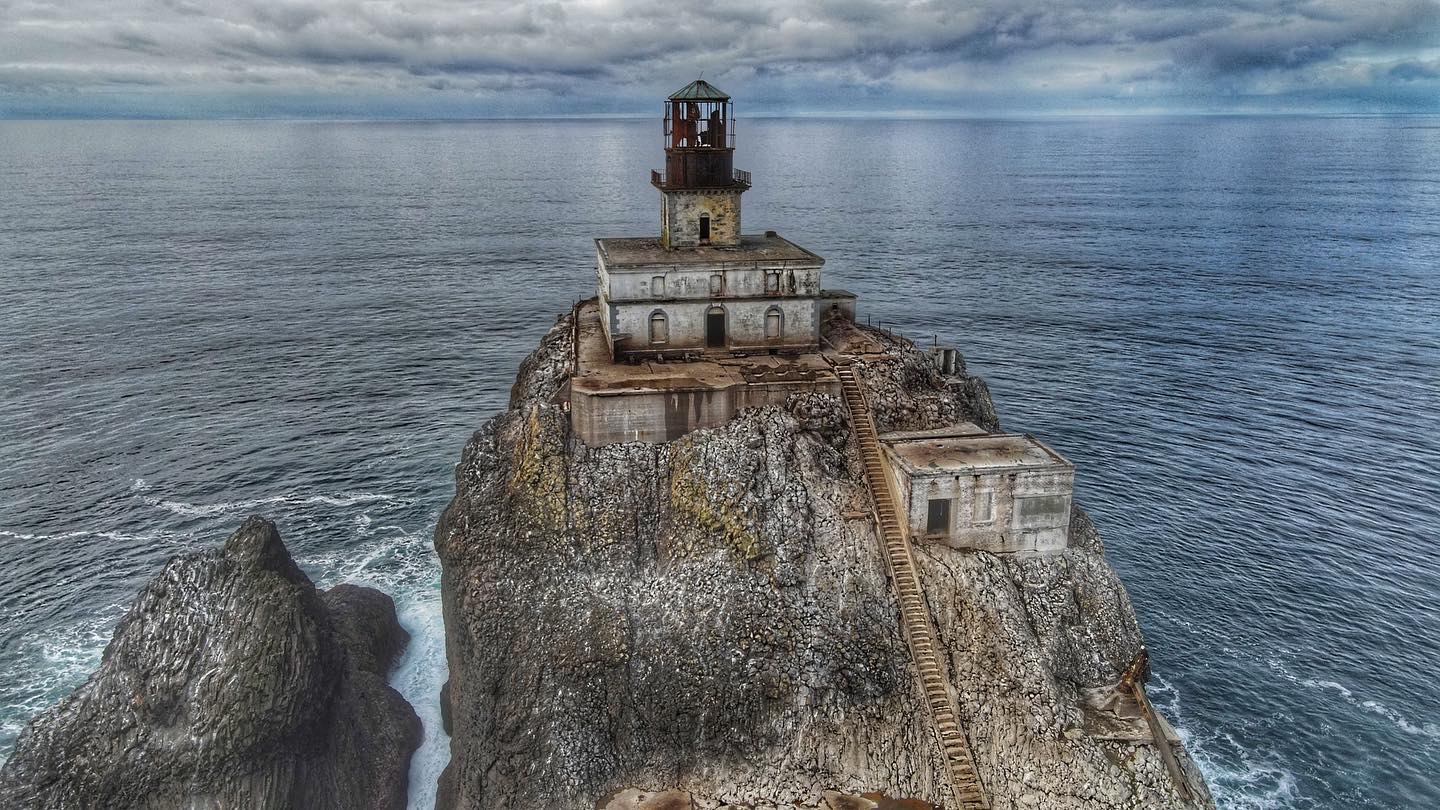
Tillamook Light - December 2022

== See also ==
- List of lighthouses on the Oregon Coast

== Bibliography ==
- Gibbs, James A.; Bert Webber (2000). Oregon's Seacoast Lighthouses. Webb Research Group. ISBN 0-936738-57-X.
- Annual Report. United States. Light-House Board. 1878.
