= Bandon Marsh National Wildlife Refuge =

Wildlife refuge in Oregon, United States

- IUCN category IV (habitat/species management area)
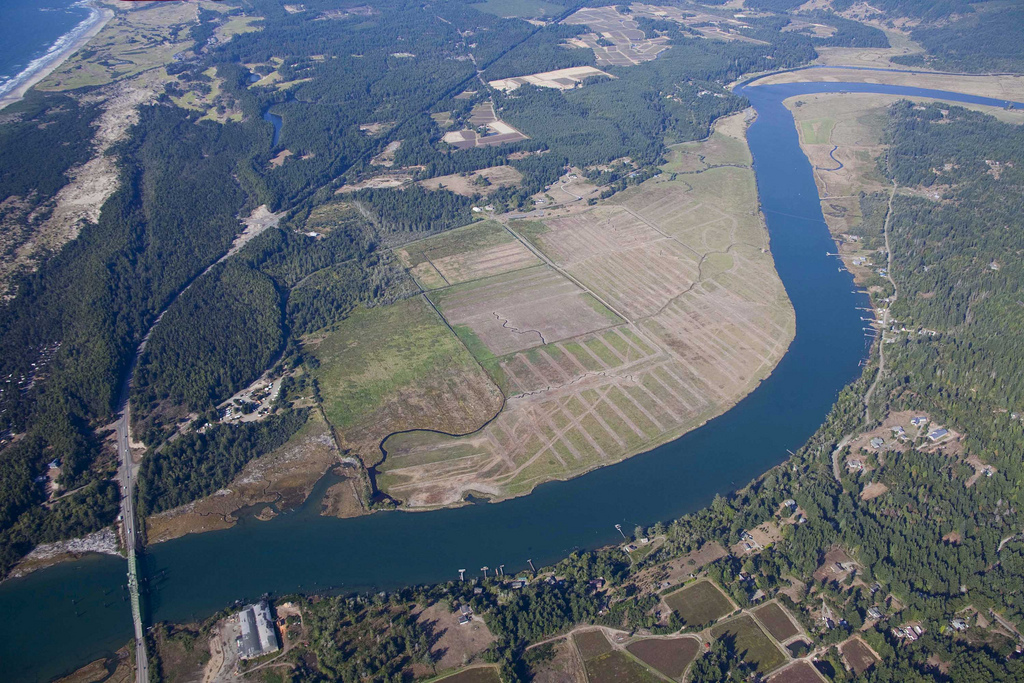
- Aerial view

- Location within Oregon
- Location: Coos County, Oregon
- Nearest city: Bandon, Oregon
- Coordinates: 43°7′8″N 124°24′43″W
- Area: 864 acres (350 ha)
- Governing body: U.S. Fish and Wildlife Service
- Website: Bandon Marsh NWR

Bandon Marsh National Wildlife Refuge is a U.S. National Wildlife Refuge on Oregon's coast. It is one of six National Wildlife Refuges comprising the Oregon Coast National Wildlife Refuge Complex and is renowned among bird watchers for being able to view rare shorebirds including ruff, Hudsonian godwit, and Mongolian plover. The refuge was last expanded in 1999, it now has 889 acres (3.60 km^{2}) in two units: Bandon Marsh and Ni-les'tun.

== Recreation ==
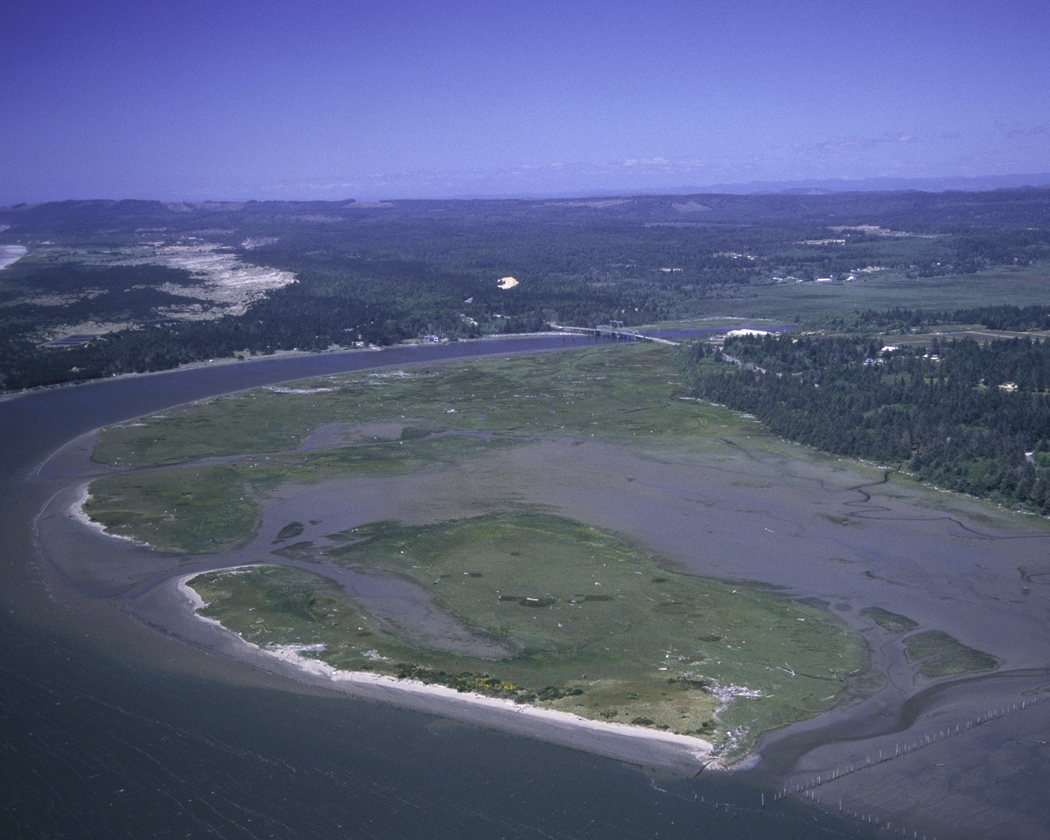
Bandon Marsh National Wildlife Refuge

Bandon Marsh is popular for hunting, fishing, clamming, birding and photography. The wildlife refuge protects the largest tidal salt marsh in the Coquille River estuary. The mudflats are rich in clam, crab, worm, and shrimp and attracts migrating shorebirds, waterfowl, coho salmon, as well as the California brown pelican. More common shorebird species include western and least sandpiper, semipalmated plover, black-bellied plover, Pacific golden plover, red phalarope, whimbrel, dunlin.

== The Ni-Les'tun Unit ==
The Ni-les'tun unit is a habitat restoration project which will eventually benefit fish and wildlife. In consists of intertidal and freshwater marsh, and riparian land. It also protects a 4,500-year-old Native American archaeological site of the Coquille Indian Tribe. The Refuge is planning a marsh restoration for this unit where an influx of saltwater and freshwater will allow a revival of mudflats and marsh plants, and interconnecting tidal channels will bisect the wildlife habitat south of the overlook deck. As the land returns to a functioning intertidal marsh, flocks of seasonally driven migratory birds and young fish will use the restored habitat.

There are several overlooks, as well as access for hunters, birders, fishermen, and clammers. State and federal regulations are in effect. The Marsh is located just north of Bandon, on the north side of the Coquille River across from Bullards Beach State Park.

== See also ==
- List of National Wildlife Refuges
- Natural environment
- Nature
