= Three Arch Rocks National Wildlife Refuge =

Protected area in Oregon, United States

Three Arch National Wildlife Refuge and Wilderness
- IUCN category IV (habitat/species management area)
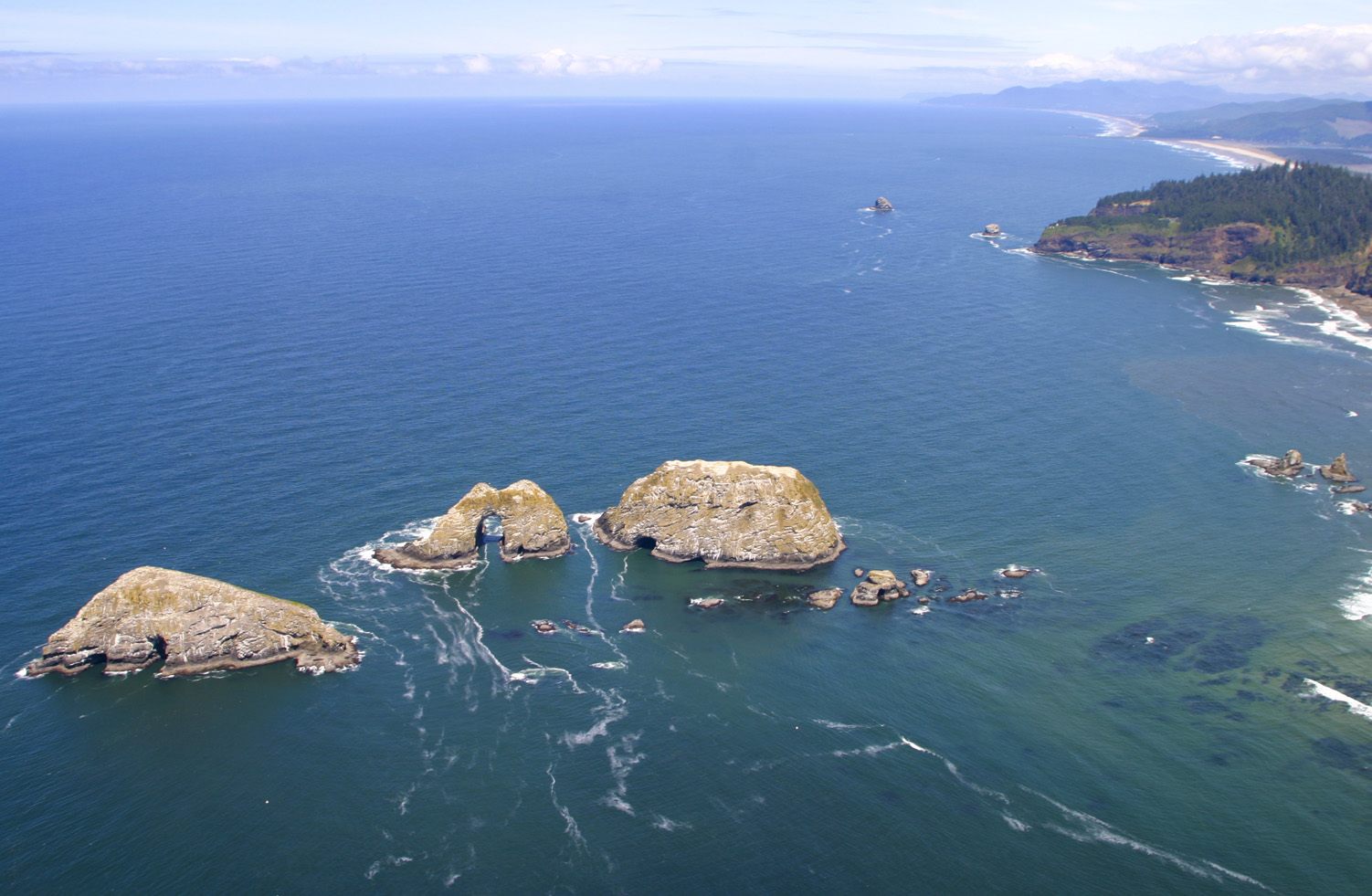
- Interactive map of Three Arch National Wildlife Refuge and Wilderness
- Location: Tillamook County, Oregon, United States
- Nearest city: Oceanside, Oregon
- Coordinates: 45.4623244°N 123.9887422°W
- Area: 15.00 acres (6.07 ha)
- Established: October 14, 1907
- Governing body: U.S. Fish and Wildlife Service
- Website: Three Arch Rocks NWR

Three Arch Rocks National Wildlife Refuge is a U.S. National Wildlife Refuge off the northern Oregon Coast. It is located on the central coast of Tillamook County, in the northwestern part of Oregon. It is one of six National Wildlife Refuges within the Oregon Coast National Wildlife Refuge Complex and was the first National Wildlife Refuge west of the Mississippi River. In 1970 the Refuge was designated as wilderness. It is one of the smallest wilderness areas in the United States.

== Geography ==
Three Arch Rocks consists of 15 acres (6 ha) on three large and six small rocky islands located about a half mile (1 km) offshore from Oceanside. It is one of the smallest designated wilderness areas in the U.S., but features the largest colony of breeding tufted puffins and the largest common murre colony south of Alaska. It is the only northern Oregon pupping site for the threatened Steller sea lion.

== History ==
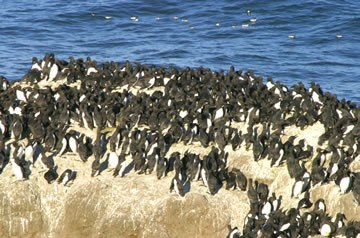
Common murre colony at Three Arch Rocks.

The refuge was established by President Theodore Roosevelt after being persuaded by two young conservationists — William L. Finley and Herman Bohlman — who studied and photographed Three Arch Rocks from Oceanside beginning in 1901. They recorded hunters killing dozens of sea lions at a time for skin and oil, and sportsmen shooting seabirds purely for sport. Due to a scarcity of regional chicken farms at the time, seabird eggs were priced at up to a dollar per dozen, encouraging egg harvesting and reducing the bird colony population. Finley and Bohlman suggested a wildlife refuge to Roosevelt to protect dwindling populations and ensure survival of seabird and marine mammal populations. Roosevelt declared the Three Rocks area a National Wildlife Refuge in 1907. In 1970 the United States Congress designated the Refuge wilderness. In 1994, there was a sighting of a group of 2 or 3 North Pacific right whales, the most rare and endangered of all large whales at the Rocks.

== Protection ==
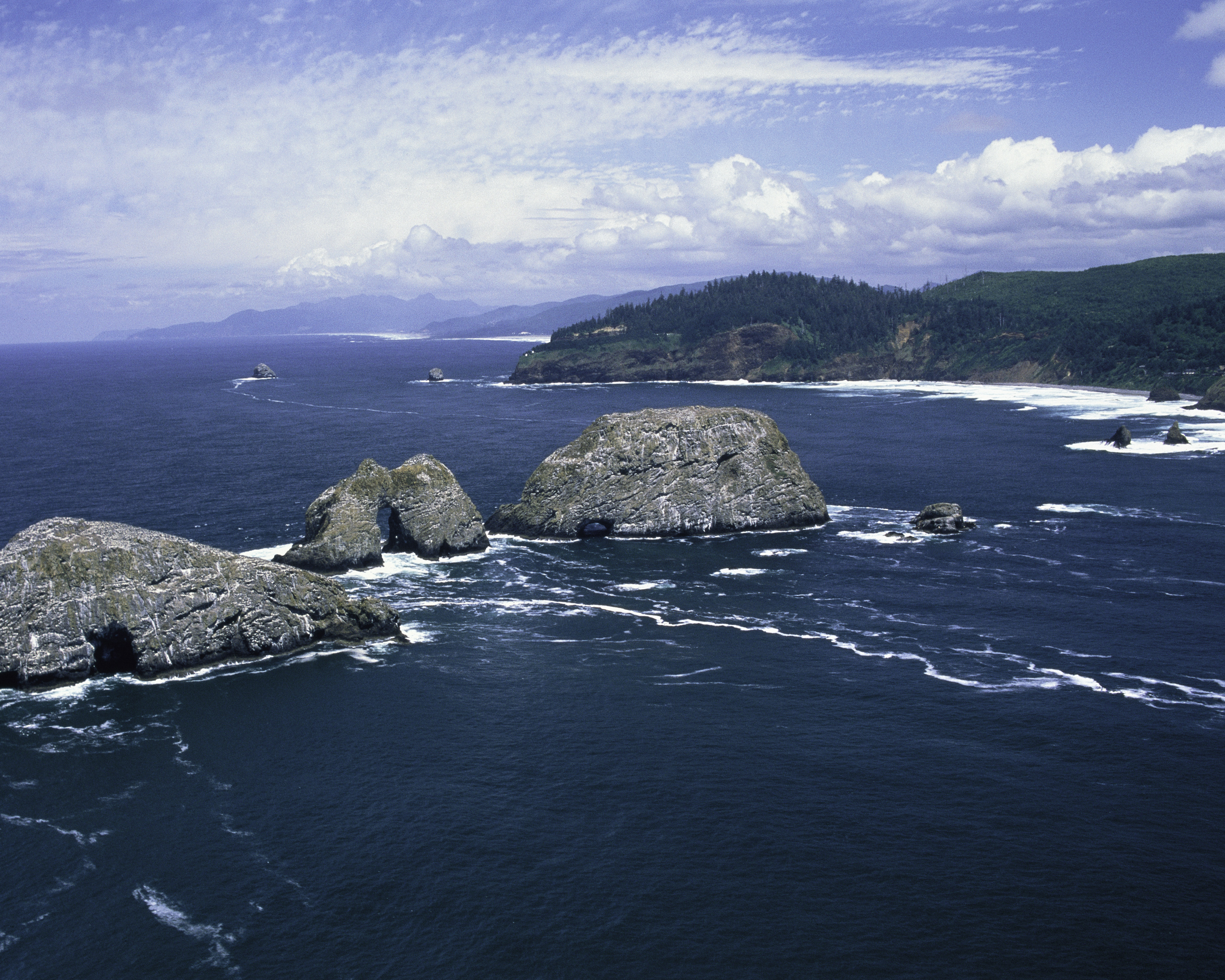
View from the south

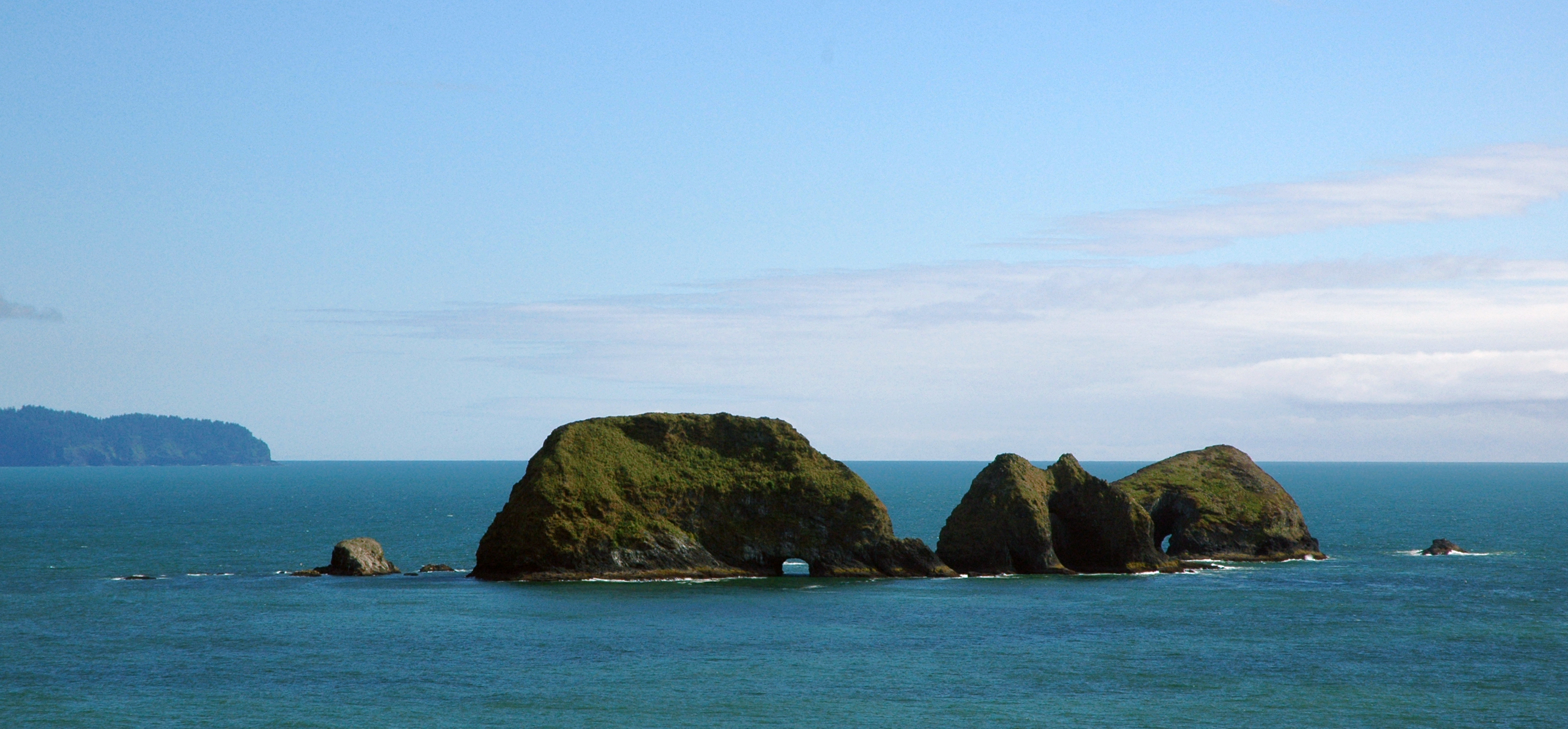
View from the Cape Meares Light

The Three Arch Rocks Refuge has provided protection for Oregon's largest seabird nesting colony of more than 230,000 birds since October 14, 1907. The entire Oregon Coast National Wildlife Refuge Complex protect over a million nesting seabirds, including common murres, tufted puffins, cormorants, and storm-petrels.

== Access ==
The islands are closed to public access. Boats must remain at least 500 ft (150 m) away during summer months, and aircraft must maintain at least 2,000 ft (600 m) clearance. The area is managed by the United States Fish and Wildlife Service.

== See also ==
- List of National Wildlife Refuges in Oregon
- List of Oregon Wildernesses
- List of U.S. Wilderness Areas
- Wilderness Act
