= Oregon Islands National Wildlife Refuge =

Protected area in Oregon, United States

- IUCN category IV (habitat/species management area)
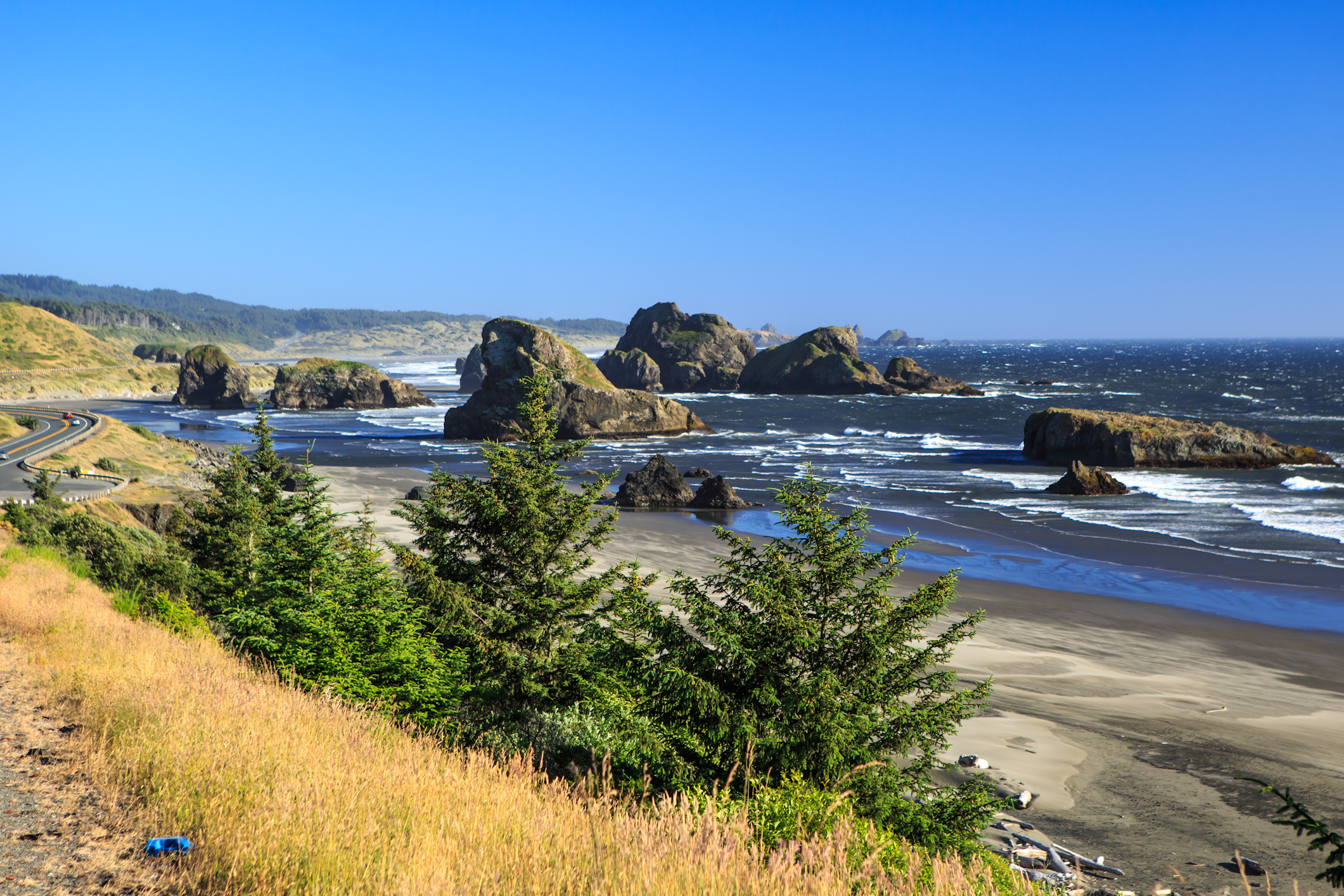
- Hunter's Cove
- Interactive map of Oregon Islands National Wildlife Refuge
- Location: Oregon
- Coordinates: 44°10′59″N 124°07′19″W
- Area: 1,083 acres (438 ha)
- Created: 1935
- Governing body: United States Fish and Wildlife Service
- Website: Oregon Islands NWR

Oregon Islands National Wildlife Refuge is a U.S. National Wildlife Refuge off the southwestern Oregon Coast. It is one of six National Wildlife Refuges comprising the Oregon Coast National Wildlife Refuge Complex. The Oregon Islands provides wilderness protection to 1,853 small islands, rocks, and reefs plus two headlands, totaling 371 acres (150 ha) spanning 1,083 acres (438 ha) of Oregon's coastline from the Oregon–California border to Tillamook Head. There are sites in six of the seven coastal counties of Oregon. From north to south they are Clatsop, Tillamook, Lincoln, Lane, Coos, and Curry counties. (Douglas County is the only coastal Oregon county not included in the refuge.) The area is managed by the United States Fish and Wildlife Service.

== History ==
The Oregon Islands National Wildlife Refuge was created in 1935 by the federal government. Haystack Rock off Cannon Beach was added to the refuge in 1968, which became a wilderness area in 1978. The first mainland addition to the refuge came in 1991 when Coquille Point near Bandon was added. In 1999, the shipwreck of the New Carissa near Coos Bay spilled oil that killed some birds at the refuge.

== Wildlife and access ==
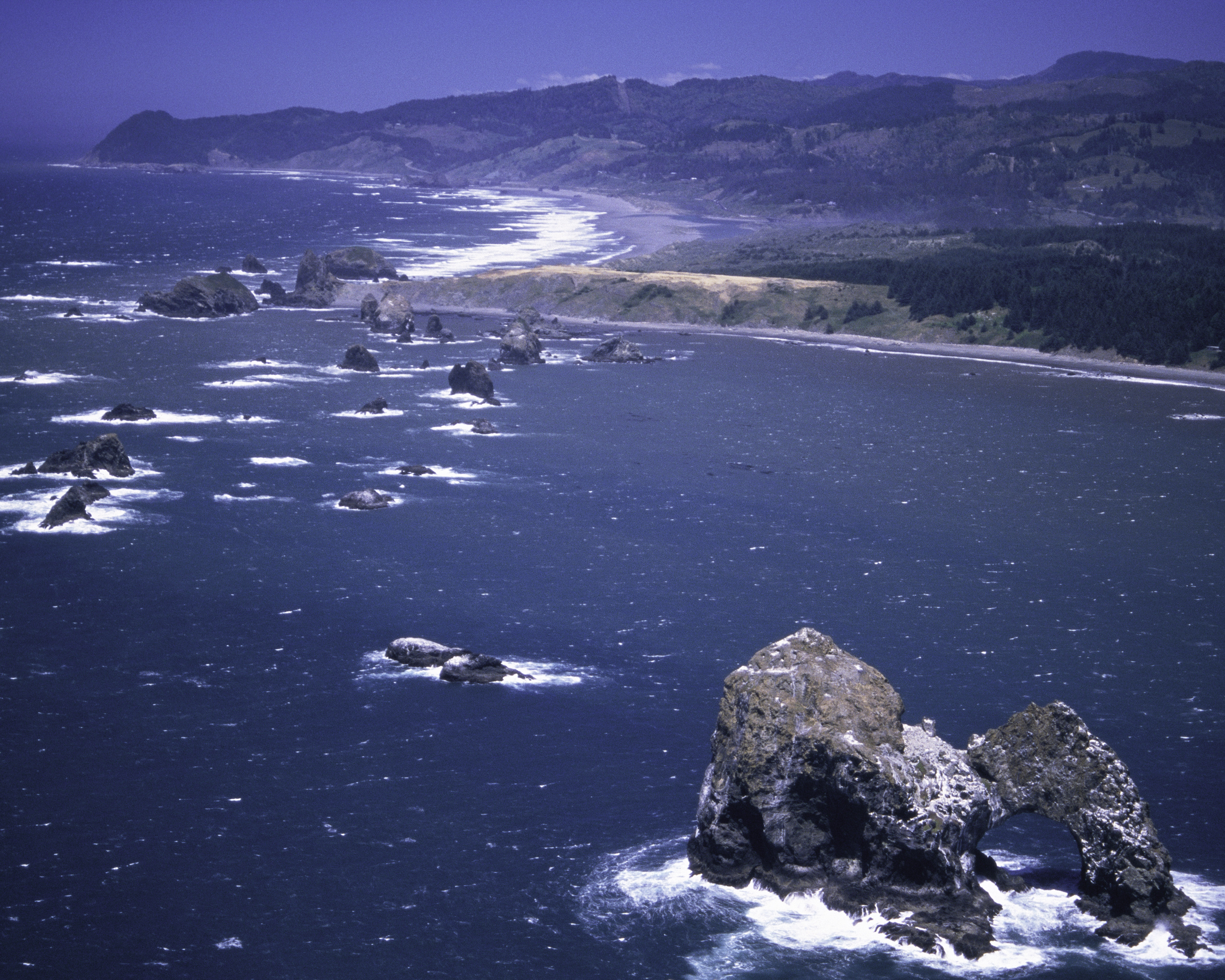
View from the south, Oregon Islands NWR

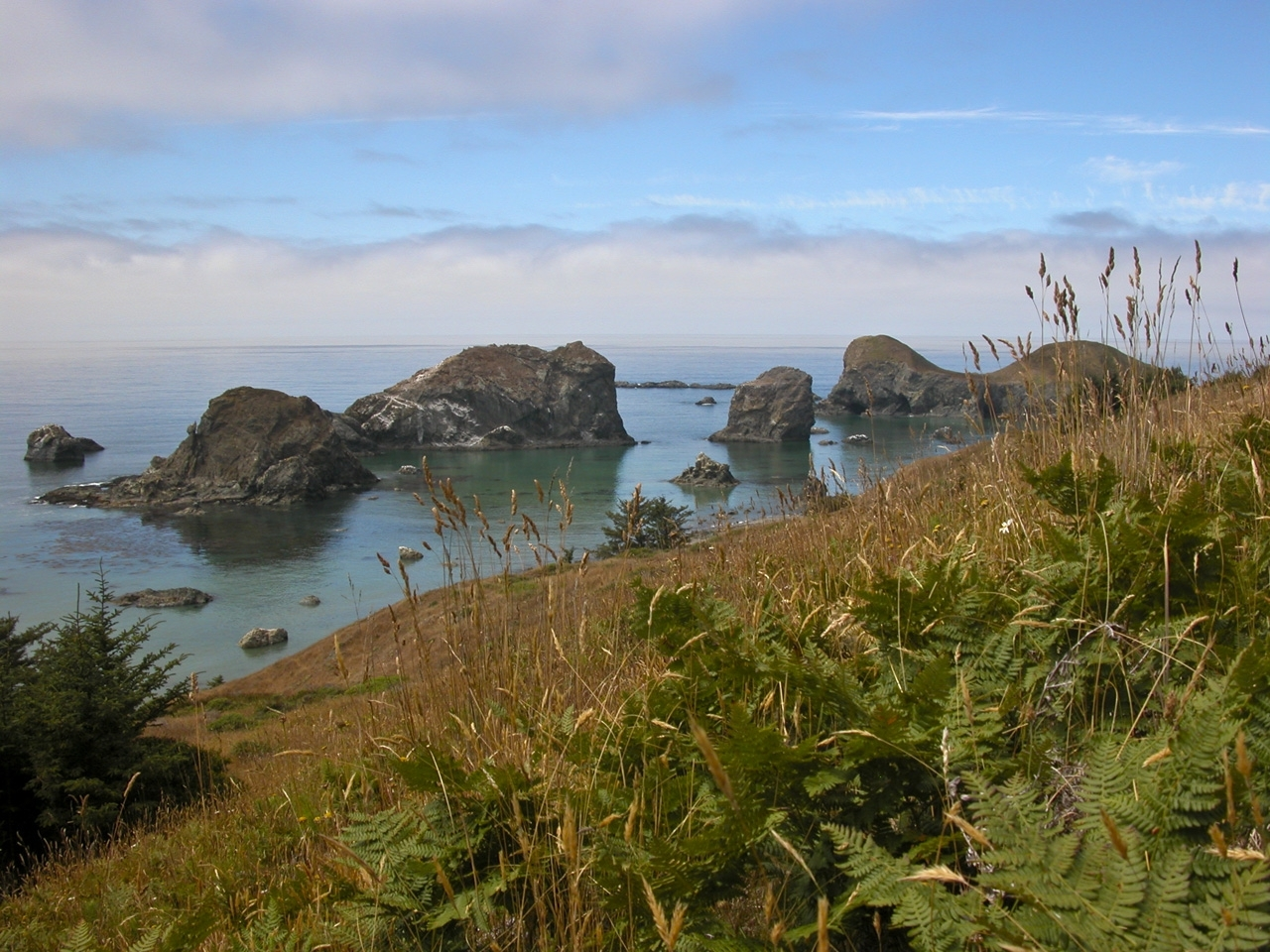
View of seabird colonies from the Crook Point Unit of Oregon Islands NWR

It is a sanctuary for nesting seabirds of thirteen species—some of the most important nesting seabird colonies in the U.S. Over 1.2 million individuals nest in colonies here, more than on the California and Washington coasts combined. The most prevalent species are common murres, tufted puffins, rhinoceros and Cassin's auklets, pigeon guillemots, Leach's storm-petrels, several species of gulls, and Caspian terns.

Four species of pinniped breed, molt, and rest on these lands, including harbor seals, Steller and California sea lions. The southern portion of the refuge provides the greatest number of breeding and pupping sites for Steller sea lions in the U.S. outside Alaska.

Except for Tillamook Rock Light and its surrounding 1-acre (4,000 m^{2}) rock, all the islands are closed to public access. Boats must remain at least 500 feet (150 m) away, and aircraft are asked to maintain at least 2,000 ft (600 m) clearance. However, good viewing is possible from Coquille Point in Bandon and other locations suggested by the Oregon Coast Birding Trail.

== See also ==
- Pacific Flyway
- Important Bird Area
- List of National Wildlife Refuges in Oregon
- List of Oregon Wildernesses
- Wilderness Act
- List of U.S. Wilderness Areas
