= Susan Weber =

Susan or Sue Weber may refer to:

- Sue Weber (born 1986), American soccer defender
- Susan Weber (historian) (born 1954), American historian

== See also ==
- Susan Webber (disambiguation)
