= Mon Amour Mon Parapluie =

2001 film by Giada Dobrzenska

Mon Amour, Mon Parapluie
- Directed by: Giada Dobrzenska
- Screenplay by: Tara Hungerford
- Produced by: Paul Armstrong, Robin Chan
- Starring: Tara Hungerford, Douglas Coupland, William Gibson, Derek de Lint, Jeff Seymour, Mary Black
- Cinematography: Gregory Middleton
- Edited by: Mark Lemon
- Music by: Nick Lloyd Webber
- Production companies: Little Wonder Productions; Parapluie Productions
- Release date: 11 November 2001
- Running time: 11 minutes
- Country: Canada
- Language: English

Mon Amour, Mon Parapluie is a short film directed by Giada Dobrzenska and featuring cameo appearances by William Gibson and Douglas Coupland. The film was nominated for nine categories of British Columbia's Leo Awards, including one to Studio X for sound editing. It was an official 2007 selection at Big Sur International Film Festival.

Described as a 'timeless visual poem', the story centres around a young woman (played by Tara Hungerford) who loses her umbrella in a café. The incident alters her perception of the world, bringing with it an acceptance of loss and change. The film's music was composed by Nick Lloyd Webber, son of Andrew Lloyd Webber.

The film was featured as part of the Rendez-Vous du Cinéma Québécois et Francophone 2008 programme at the Vancouver International Film Centre. A still image from the film was featured at a Heritage Vancouver Long Table Social Series in April 2010, a series connecting Vancouver's visual arts with its heritage structures. In 2015, Women in Film and Television Vancouver included the film as part of its 25th Anniversary Retrospective.
