= Ross Kempsell, Baron Kempsell =

British political adviser (born 1992)

The Right Honourable The Lord Kempsell
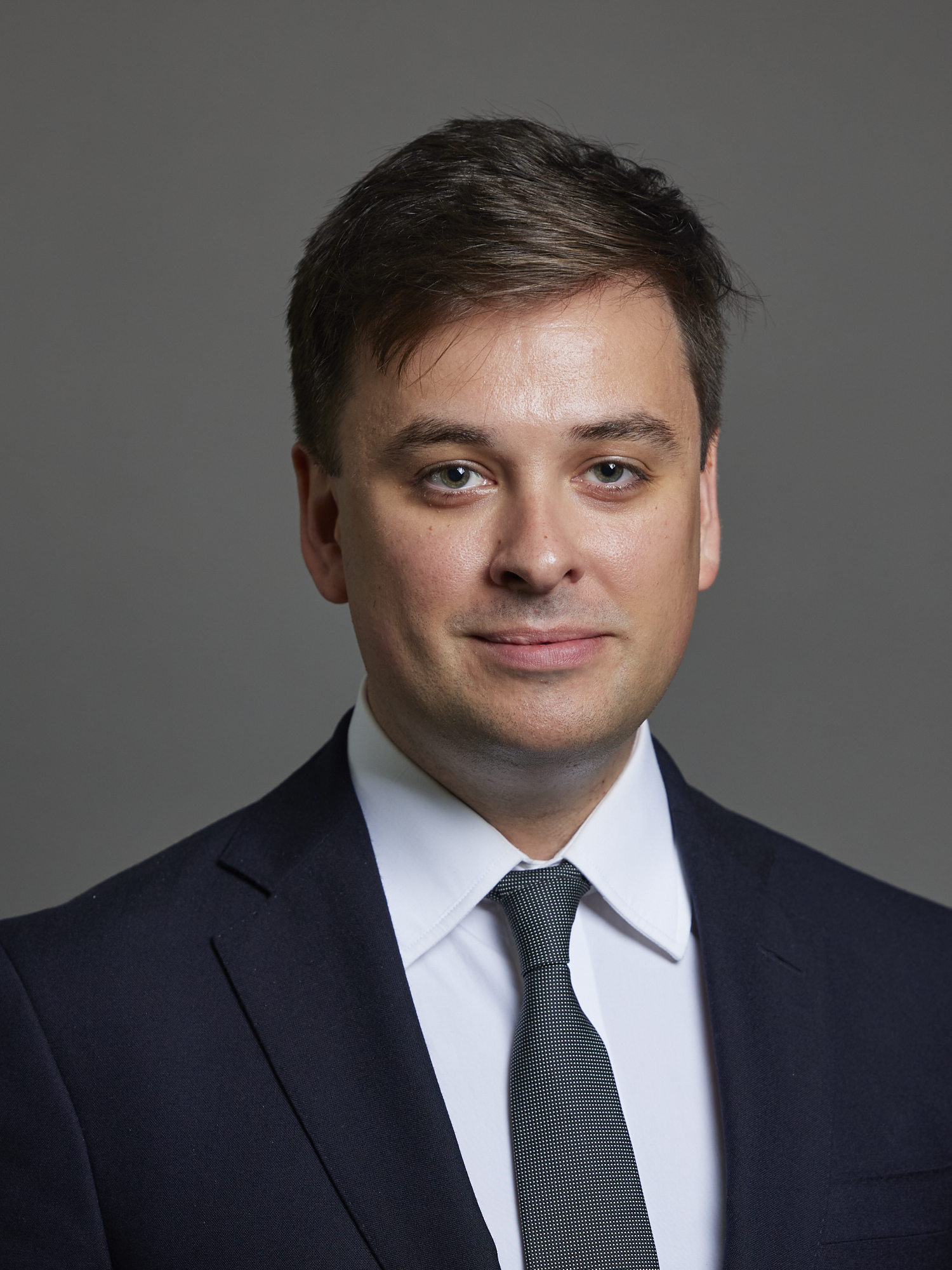
- Official portrait, 2024

Member of the House of Lords
- Lord Temporal
- Life peerage 11 July 2023

Personal details
- Born: Ross John Kempsell; May 1992 (age 34)
- Party: Conservative
- Education: The John Henry Newman School, Stevenage
- Alma mater: Christ's College, Cambridge
- Occupation: Special adviser

Ross John Kempsell, Baron Kempsell (born May 1992) is a British political adviser and life peer.

== Early life and education ==
Kempsell was born in May 1992. He was educated at The John Henry Newman School in Stevenage and at Christ's College, Cambridge, where he wrote for the weekly student newspaper Varsity. He graduated from the University of Cambridge with a Bachelor of Arts (BA) degree in 2013.

== Career ==
He was formerly a journalist at the right-wing political website Guido Fawkes. In 2019, Kempsell interviewed Boris Johnson during his campaign for the leadership of the Conservative Party, in which Johnson declared that he liked to make models of buses to relax. He also worked as a journalist for Times Radio and was a political editor for TalkRadio. He returned to Guido Fawkes in 2024 as a contributing editor.

Having been political director of the Conservative Party, he was appointed director of the Conservative Research Department in 2020. Following Rishi Sunak's unopposed selection as leader of the Conservative Party, Kempsell departed the Conservative Research Department in 2022.

=== House of Lords ===
He was nominated for a life peerage by Boris Johnson in the 2022 Prime Minister's Resignation Honours, and was created Baron Kempsell, of Letchworth in the County of Hertfordshire, on 11 July 2023.

Kempsell was introduced to the House of Lords on 20 July, where he sits for the Conservative Party. He made his maiden speech on 18 March 2024 in response to the Spring Budget 2024. He has sat on the Modern Slavery Act 2015 Committee since its creation in January 2024.

Orders of precedence in the United Kingdom
Preceded by The Lord Bailey of Paddington	Gentlemen; Baron Kempsell	Followed by Kulveer Ranger
