= Susan Webber =

Susan or Sue Webber may refer to:

- Susan Webber (politician) (fl. 2010s–2020s), American politician from Montana
- Susan Webber, creator of Naked Capitalism
- Susan Webber Wright (born 1948), American federal judge from Arkansas
- Susan Wessels-Webber (born 1977), South African field hockey player
- Sue Webber (fl. 2010s–2020s) Scottish politician

== See also ==
- Susan Weber (disambiguation)
