= Stephen G. Weber =

American professor of chemistry

- Education: Case Western Reserve University, McGill University
- Awards: Dal Nogare Award (2016), Palmer Award (2015)
- Scientific career
- Fields: Chromatography
- Workplaces: University of Pittsburgh
- Website: https://www.chem.pitt.edu/people/steve-weber

Stephen G. Weber is a professor of chemistry and clinical translational science at the University of Pittsburgh. He researches analytical separations theory and its application, and has developed "green" techniques for molecular recognition and microextractions. He is particularly interested in the identification of peptides and dipeptides, and their effects on neurochemistry. He has received a number of awards, including the 2016 Dal Nogare Award for "contributions to the fundamental understanding of the chromatographic process".

== Education ==
Weber attended Case Western Reserve University, receiving his BA in Chemistry and Biology in 1970. He then worked with Irving Sunshine at the Cuyahoga County Coroner’s Office, in the Forensic Toxicology group. After enlisting in the U.S. Navy, he helped to establish a drug analysis lab in the Great Lakes Naval Hospital at the Great Lakes Naval Station. He returned to university in 1974.

For his doctorate, Weber worked with William Purdy, first at the University of Maryland and then at McGill University. He received his Ph.D. from McGill University in 1979. His research at McGill involved the development of an electrochemical immunoassay using an electrochemical detector.

== Career ==
In 1979, Weber joined the Department of Chemistry at the University of Pittsburgh, where he is currently a Professor of Chemistry and Clinical Translational Science. He has served in a number of capacities at the university, including becoming Director of Graduate Studies for the Chemistry Department in 2001. He has published over 200 journal articles, and has served on the editorial boards of Analytical Chemistry, Trends in Analytical Chemistry and the Journal of Chromatography.

== Research ==
A major focus of his research is analytical separations theory and its application. His research group develops analytical techniques for molecular recognition and molecularly selective microextractions, and utilizes “green” separation procedures using aqueous solutions and nonvolatile polymeric systems. They have developed thin films for solid-phase micro extraction (SPME).

Weber develops electrochemical detectors for use with liquid chromatography techniques. An important area of application is the identification of peptides, which help to control the body. Some of the systems which neuropeptides influence include pain, mood, social and emotional behavior, responses to stress, and memory. Understanding how peptides affect neurochemistry and other biological systems has important implications for medicine and pharmaceutical development.

Dipeptides can be present in the brain at sub-picomole levels. To work effectively at this level, techniques must be highly sensitive and selective. Weber and his colleagues work on techniques to sample minute quantities from brain fluid and from single living cells. They are developing specialized sampling protocols with the goal of obtaining minute amounts of material from living organisms with minimal damage.

== Awards and honors ==
- 2016, Dal Nogare Award, Chromatography Forum of the Delaware Valley
- 2015, Palmer Award, Minnesota Chromatography Forum
- 2012, Provost’s Award for Excellence in Mentoring, University of Pittsburgh
- 2008, Pittsburgh Award, American Chemical Society
