= Gordon Webber =

Gordon Webber may refer to:

- Gordon Webber (author)
- Gordon Webber (artist)
- Gordon Webber (politician)
