= Seb Webber =

Seb "Seb" Webber
- Born: Hertfordshire, England
- Known for: Founder, CrowdSurge

Sebastian "Seb" Webber is a British, Los Angeles–based, music industry executive. He is the co-founder of Godless Studios. He co-founded CrowdSurge, a ticket management company, served as Creative Director for Jay Z's streaming platform TIDAL, and founded the electronic music label FMLY with Universal Music Group. In 2010, Webber was named as one of Billboard's "30 Under 30" and is a member of the American Association of Independent Music.

== Early life ==
Born in Hertfordshire, England, Webber attended the John Henry Newman School and The Knights Templar School in Baldock, North Hertfordshire. At 17, Webber completed school early and moved to London to pursue a university degree and work in the music industry. Working as a DJ, he started putting on FONO nights (For One Night Only) around London, an event that combined a two-hour set from a live indie rock music band, followed by a two-hour set of house music played by Webber. During this time, Webber met and became friends with BBC Radio 1 DJ Zane Lowe. Soon after, Webber became Lowe's opening act.

In 2004, he enrolled at the University of Westminsters' Commercial Music course, but shortly afterwards was offered an intern position in the mailroom of XL Recordings by owner Richard Russell. Webber decided to continue with his degree while working at XL Recordings graduating in 2007 with a BA (Hons).

== Career ==
In 2005, Webber was promoted to Product Manager at XL Recordings by owner Richard Russell. Webber worked with acts including Adele, Basement Jaxx, M.I.A, Peaches, Radiohead and The White Stripes. More specifically, Webber did A&R for Adele's album 21, and M.I.A's Kala. Outside of XL, Webber did A&R for Leona Lewis' I Am and Steve Angello's Wild Youth. In 2009, he was promoted to XL Recordings Director of A&R, and moved to Los Angeles to open the label's West Coast office. In Los Angeles, Webber signed new acts, for which in 2010 Billboard magazine named him one of their "30 Under 30" music business stars. Webber left XL Recordings in 2011.

Webber, with business partner Matt Jones, launched CrowdSurge in 2006. CrowdSurge is a web-based app that cuts out the ticket agency in the selling of artist-controlled concert tickets. An immediate and continuing competitor to TicketMaster, early clients included Coldplay, Foo Fighters and Paul McCartney. In 2011, after CrowdSurge was expanded through funding from investors including Benjamin Bronfman, Webber sold his shares in the company to Leonard Blavatnik, the owner of Warner Music Group, at a valuation of $30 million.

In 2009, Webber started to independently manage dubstep producer and DJ Rusko, NASA and Sam Spiegel.

Following his 2011 exit from CrowdSurge, Webber sought to build a music company that could suit artists' needs to the fullest. He resultantly invested in and joined British Columbia based artist management company SQE Music, founded in 2010 by Nathan Beswick and Duncan MacRae. As general manager, Webber fulfilled SQE's business model: find ambitious artists, ask them what they need to realise their career goals, and be able to do anything that can help. Officially launched in April 2011, artists signed to the company included At the Drive-In, Brendan Canning from Broken Social Scene, DJ Fresh, Rusko and N.A.S.A. In September 2012, Webber left SQE to join Red Light Management.

Webber founded, in 2013, the Toronto/Los Angeles based electronic music label FMLY. Distributed through Universal Music Canada, the FMLY roster includes The Prodigy, Rusko, Ferry Corsten, New World Punx, Guiliano Rascan, Cyzon, and Plain Language.

In February 2014, Webber joined SponsorsOne's Advisory Team to help guide the company's tech acquisitions and talent partnerships.

In 2015, Webber became the Creative Director for Jay Z's streaming platform TIDAL, helping the company forge a path in the early days of the streaming era.

Webber completed his first project as executive producer for Italian DJ Giorgio Morodor's 2015 studio album Déjà Vu which features collaborations with Britney Spears, Kylie Minogue, Kelis, Sia, Charli XCX, Mikky Ekko, Foxes and Matthew Koma, among others. The album's second single "Right Here, Right Now" featuring Kylie Minogue topped the Billboard Hot Dance Club Songs in April 2015 while the third single "Déjà Vu" featuring Sia reached number one, in the US, on the Billboard Dance Chart. For the single "Déjà Vu" featuring Sia, Webber also worked as executive producer for the music video (short) directed by Swedish actress Alexandra Dahlström.
