= Cardinal Newman (disambiguation) =

Cardinal Newman can refer to:

- John Henry Newman, an Anglican and later Roman Catholic theologian and cardinal.

Roman Catholic educational institutions named after the theologian include:

== England ==
- Cardinal Newman Catholic High School, Warrington, England
- Cardinal Newman Catholic School, Bedfordshire, England
- Cardinal Newman Catholic School and Community College, Coventry, England
- Cardinal Newman Catholic School, Hove, England
- Cardinal Newman College, Preston, Lancashire, England
- Newman Catholic College, London, England
- The Saint John Henry Newman Catholic School, Stevenage, England
- Birmingham Newman University, England

== Elsewhere ==
- Cardinal Newman High School, Bellshill, Scotland
- Cardinal Newman High School (Santa Rosa, California)
- Cardinal Newman High School (West Palm Beach, Florida)
- Cardinal Newman High School (Columbia, South Carolina)
- Cardinal Newman Roman Catholic School, Rhydyfelin, Wales
- Newman College, Perth, Australia
- Newman College, Melbourne, Australia
- Newman College, Thodupuzha, India
- Newman College, Dublin, Ireland former private college
- St. John Henry Newman Catholic High School, Toronto, Canada
- St. John Henry Newman Catholic Secondary School, Hamilton, Ontario, Canada
- Newman University (Kansas), Wichita, United States
