= Anna Webber =

Anna Webber may refer to:

- Anna Webber (photographer) (born 1986), American photographer
- Anna Webber (musician)

== See also ==
- Anna Weber, Canadian Mennonite Fraktur artist
