= James Webber (disambiguation) =

James Webber (1772–1847) was an English churchman.

James, Jay or Jim may also refer to:

- Jay Webber (born James K. "Jay" Webber; 1972), American politician
- Jim Webber (born James Richard Webber ; 1940–2024), Australian politician

== See also ==
- James Weber Linn (1876–1939), American educator, writer and politician
- James Webber Smith (1778–1853), British Royal Artillery officer
