= Stephen Webber (disambiguation) =

Stephen Webber (born 1983) is an American politician in Missouri

Stephen Webber may also refer to:

- Steve Webber (1947–2022), American baseball pitching coach
- Stephen Webber (De Bortoli Wines) (born 1965), Australian co-manager of De Bortoli Wines

== Fictional Characters ==
- Steven Webber, fictional character since 1977 on the American daytime television drama General Hospital

== See also ==
- Steven Weber (disambiguation)
- Stephen Weber, French actor, see The Man at Midnight
