= Tillamook Head =

High promontory on Oregon coast, U.S.

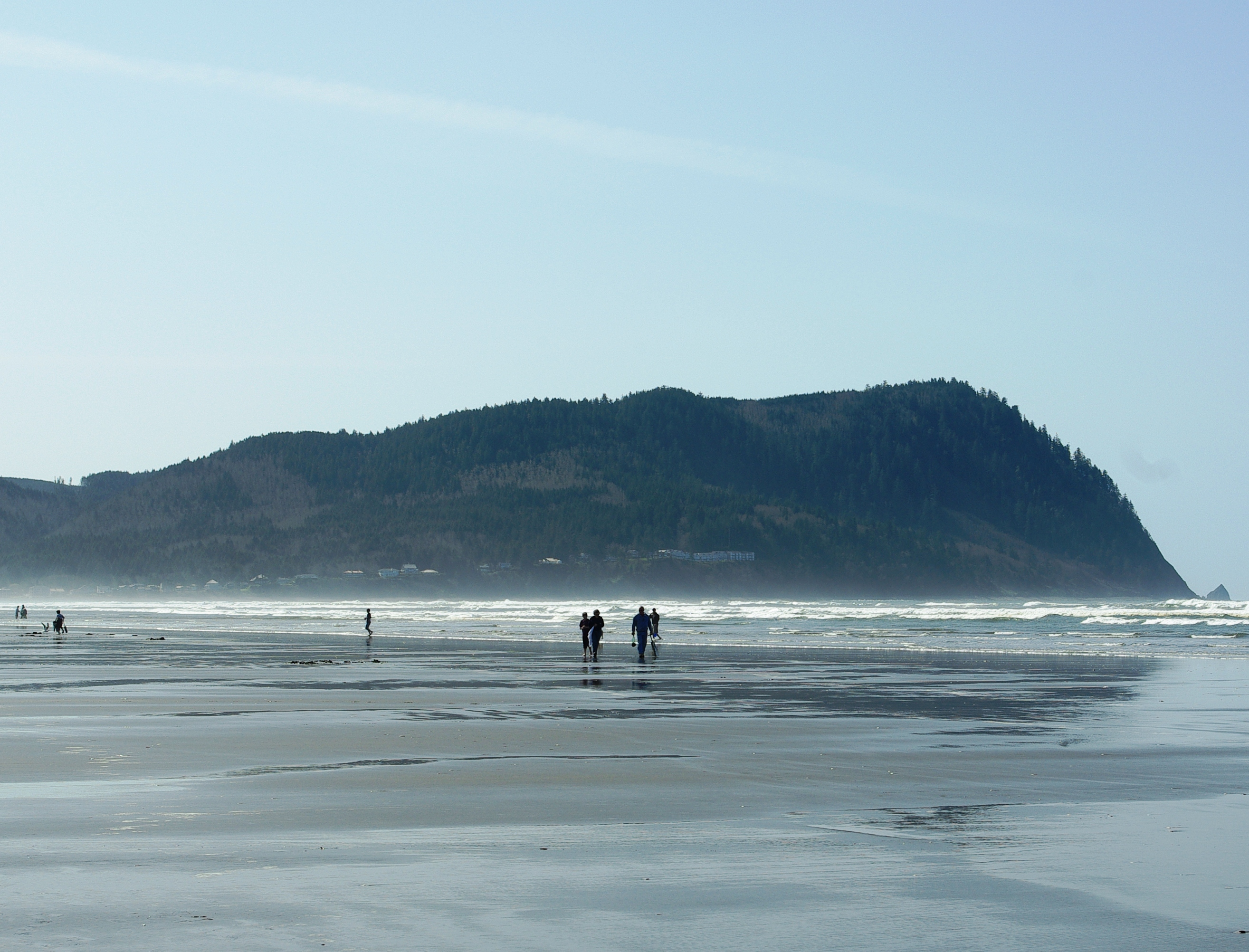
- Tillamook Head, from Seaside, Oregon looking south

- Location within Oregon Location within the United States
- Location: Clatsop County, Oregon, United States
- Nearest city: Seaside, Oregon
- Coordinates: 45.9461°N 123.9917°W
- Website: Tillamook Head

Tillamook Head is a high promontory on the Pacific coast of northwest Oregon in the United States. It is located in west-central Clatsop County, approximately 5 mi (8 km) southwest of Seaside. The promontory forms a steep rocky bluff on the ocean, approximately 1,200 ft (366 m) high, forested with Sitka spruce. It is located in Ecola State Park.

The promontory is named after the Tillamook, a Salishan-speaking tribe of Native Americans who inhabited the coast south of the promontory in the 19th century. In 1806, Captain William Clark and 12 members of the Corps of Discovery documented their journey south from Fort Clatsop, hiking over the promontory where they encountered a beached whale.

In 2002, the highest point on Tillamook Head was named Clark's Mountain.

== Geology ==
Tillamook Head is a tilted remnant of a flow of 15-million-year-old Columbia River basalt. The lava welled up near modern-day Idaho, and flooded down the Columbia Gorge. It spread along the Oregon Coast to Tillamook Head, cooling to a 600-foot thick basalt sill.

== See also ==
- Nehalem Bank
- Tillamook Rock Light
- Tillamook Bay
- Oregon Coast National Wildlife Refuge Complex
- Cape Meares
