= Elizabeth Webber (disambiguation) =

Elizabeth Webber, character in General Hospital.

Elizabeth or Lizzie Web(b)er may also refer to:

- Beth Webber, character in The Company of Strangers
- Elizabeth Weber (born 1923), writer
- Elizabeth Webber Harris, awarded honorary Victoria Cross
- Lizzie Webber (1852), a ship built by William Pile
- Lizzie Weber reef on Malaysia–Vietnam border
