= The Saint John Henry Newman Catholic School, Stevenage =

The Saint John Henry Newman School

Location
- Hitchin Road; Stevenage, Hertfordshire, SG1 4AE; England; 51°55′11″N 0°12′49″W

Information
- Type: Academy
- Motto: Cor ad cor loquitur (in English this means "heart speaks to heart")
- Religious affiliation: Roman Catholic
- Established: 1981
- Department for Education URN: 137895 Tables
- Ofsted: Reports
- Head teacher: David Carrasco-Morley (2023 - present)
- Previous Head teachers: Clive Mathew (2012-2023) Michael Kelly (1993 - 2012)
- Gender: Coeducational
- Age: 11 to 18
- Enrolment: 1,481
- Colours: Blue, red, gold
- Website: www.jhn.herts.sch.uk

The Saint John Henry Newman School is a Roman Catholic secondary school with academy status in Stevenage, Hertfordshire, England. In its most recent Ofsted inspection it was classed as a good school and the diocesan report, assessing quality of Catholic education, classed it as outstanding. It converted to academy status on 1 March 2012.

== History ==
=== Hitchin ===
St. Michael's College was established in Grove Road, Hitchin—next to the site of a new Catholic church—in 1903 by Fr. A. Prével of the Society of Saint Edmund. In 1925, the priests from the Order of Augustinians of the Assumption assumed control of both the church and the college. St. Michael's College was a Catholic boys' school which housed a number of boarding pupils. In 1953, following a General Inspection, the College was granted temporary recognition as a private grammar school and this status was made permanent in 1958

=== Stevenage ===
The expansion of Stevenage New Town during the 1960s led to the relocation of the school to Sandown Road, Stevenage, in 1968. It changed its name to St. Michael's RC School.

In 1985, the process of merging St. Michael's School with St. Angela's School for Girls began. The merging process was completed in 1987 under the leadership of Chair of Governors, John Alan Scouller and the site of St. Michael's was sold, while the new "John Henry Newman School" moved to the former site of St. Angela's on Hitchin Road. The name of the school commemorates Cardinal St John Henry Newman.The School then changed its name to the Saint John Henry Newman School in 2019 after the canonisation of John Henry Newman in the Vatican city

=== School facilities ===
The school's drama, music and dance facilities are in a 'pavilion' building built in 2015 that cost £3 million.

The school's sporting facilities including a hockey/football astroturf, tennis courts, sports hall and 2 full size pitches.

The Newest Facility The Mathew block was made in October of 2024, and Is known as the main block It Costed £67 million.

== Notable people ==
=== Former pupils ===
- George Beck (1904-1978), Archbishop of Liverpool, (at St Michael's, Hitchin), (also Headmaster)
- Lewis Hamilton (b. 1985) - racing driver. Hamilton left the school at 15, after being wrongfully expelled by the Headmaster. He was reinstated following an appeal to the school board.
- Ross Kempsell (b. 1992) - political adviser and life peer
- Seb Webber, international DJ and A&R at XL Recordings (1996-2001)
- Ashley Young (b. 1985) - footballer, Watford F.C., Aston Villa F.C., Manchester United F.C., Everton F.C.

=== Former staff ===
- David Konstant, 8th Bishop of Leeds. Acting Head 1967 (at St Michael's, Stevenage)
