= Nick Lloyd Webber =

English composer (1979–2023)

The Honourable Nick Lloyd Webber
- Born: Nicholas Alastair Lloyd Webber; 22 July 1979; London, England
- Died: 25 March 2023 (aged 43); Basingstoke, Hampshire, England
- Occupations: Composer; record producer
- Spouses: Charlotte Windmill (m. 2007; div. 2016) Polly Wiltshire (m. 2018)
- Children: 2
- Father: Andrew Lloyd Webber
- Relatives: William Lloyd Webber (paternal grandfather); Julian Lloyd Webber (paternal uncle); Imogen Lloyd Webber (sister)

Nicholas Alastair Lloyd Webber (22 July 1979 – 25 March 2023) was an English composer and record producer. He was the son of composer Andrew Lloyd Webber and his first wife, Sarah Hugill.

== Early life ==
Lloyd Webber was born at King's College Hospital in London on 22 July 1979, the son of British composer Andrew Lloyd Webber and his first wife, Sarah Hugill. His older sister is the author, broadcaster, and communications executive Imogen Lloyd Webber, his grandfather was the organist, composer and music educator William Lloyd Webber, and his uncle is the cellist and music educator Julian Lloyd Webber.

He was educated at the Dragon School and St Edward's School, Oxford.

== Career ==
Composer Lloyd Webber is known for writing a theatrical and symphonic version of The Little Prince (co-written with James D. Reid) based on the book by Antoine de Saint-Exupéry. The production premiered at the Lyric Theatre Belfast and Theatre Calgary before headlining the Abu Dhabi music and arts festival with the Heritage Orchestra. Together, Lloyd Webber and Reid produced the Scottish folk music album Speyside Sessions with actor Kevin McKidd, which went to No.1 in the iTunes World Music Charts. He also composed the music for Fat Friends The Musical, which premiered at the Grand Theatre in Leeds and subsequently toured the UK in 2018. A second UK tour, planned for 2022, was postponed.

Besides musical theatre, Lloyd Webber was known for scoring the BBC One drama Love, Lies and Records, and the film The Last Bus, directed by Gillies McKinnon and starring Timothy Spall and Phyllis Logan. Lloyd Webber also wrote music for 56 Up, the eighth installment of the documentary series that began with 7 Up, for Children's television, and for television advertisements.

=== Work with his father ===
At the age of 14, Lloyd Webber was the tape operator on Sunset Boulevard: World Premiere Recording, the album of the 1993 original London production of his father's musical.

Lloyd Webber produced the Andrew Lloyd Webber Symphonic Suites at the Theatre Royal, Drury Lane in London, released by Decca Records in 2021.

Lloyd Webber co-produced and mixed the pre-production concept album of the musical Cinderella for Polydor Records, which went to number one on the official UK compilation album charts in July 2021.

== Personal life ==
In 2007, Lloyd Webber married theatre producer and designer Charlotte Windmill, with whom he had a daughter in 2008. In June 2018, he married viola player Polly Wiltshire. He was the father of two children.

== Death ==
Lloyd Webber died on 25 March 2023 aged 43 at Basingstoke Hospital, after suffering from gastric cancer for 18 months.

== Composer credits ==
Year	Title	Contribution	Notes	Ref
2001	Mon Amour Mon Parapluie	Score	Short film	
2003	Homecoming	Score	Short film	
2012	56 Up	Score	Television documentary	
2013	Mr Invisible	Score	Short film	
2016	The Little Prince	Score	Theatrical production	
2017	Love, Lies and Records	Score	BBC One	
2017	Fat Friends The Musical	Music	Theatrical production	
2020	Monarca	Licensed track	Netflix series	
2021	The Last Bus	Score	Feature film	
2021	Control Z	Licensed track	Netflix series	
