= Imogen Lloyd Webber =

British broadcaster and author (born 1977)

The Honourable Imogen Lloyd Webber
- Born: Imogen Annie Lloyd Webber; 31 March 1977 (age 49); London, England
- Education: Queen's College, London; Girton College, Cambridge
- Occupations: Author; broadcaster; communications executive
- Parent(s): Andrew Lloyd Webber; Sarah Hugill
- Relatives: William Lloyd Webber (paternal grandfather); Julian Lloyd Webber (paternal uncle); Nick Lloyd Webber (brother)
- Website: Official website

Imogen Annie Lloyd Webber (born 31 March 1977) is a British broadcaster, author, and marketing and communications executive. She is the daughter of composer Andrew Lloyd Webber and his first wife, Sarah Hugill.

== Early life and education ==
Lloyd Webber was born at King's College Hospital in London on 31 March 1977. She was educated at Queen's College, London and Girton College, Cambridge, where she studied modern political history, specializing in the role of worldwide intelligence agencies and their impact.

== Career ==
As a contributor to MSNBC, she was regularly seen on the Fox News Channel and Fox Business Network as a political commentator with a global perspective and a liberal slant on topics ranging from Afghanistan to entertainment. She was a frequent guest on the Fox News late-night panel show Red Eye and a panelist, along with Imus' longtime producer Bernard McGuirk, on the Imus in the Morning nationally syndicated radio show.

She produced Touched... For The Very First Time, written by Zoe Lewis, directed by Douglas Rintoul and starring Sadie Frost in 2009 at the Trafalgar Studios in London's West End.

In January 2018, Lloyd Webber, along with Sierra Boggess, participated in a gala performance for the 30th anniversary of The Phantom of the Opera on Broadway, and publicly interviewed her father for the first time.

In April 2020, she was promoted to senior vice president of marketing and communications at Concord Theatricals.

She is a contributor for Broadway.com, People Now's royal correspondent and a senior vice president at Concord. She was brought in by ABC News as a contributor initially to cover the 2018 wedding of Prince Harry and Meghan Markle on multiple platforms and shows, including for the full six-hour live broadcast on Good Morning America. She hosted Tony Awards specials for Broadway.com/CBS in 2016, 2017 (winning a New York Emmy) and 2018.

== Published books ==
Her non-fiction book, The Single Girl's Guide, was published by Summersdale in the United Kingdom in April 2007, and as The Single Girl's Survival Guide by Skyhorse Publishing in the US in October 2007 and again in February 2011. She later adapted it into a screenplay for film producer Lloyd Levin.

The Twitter Diaries: 2 Cities, 1 Friendship, 140 Characters, a fiction e-book that Lloyd Webber co-wrote with Georgie Thompson, debuted on 21 May 2012. It is written as a conversation on Twitter, using the 140-character limitation. The book was inspired by Thompson and Lloyd Webber meeting at a party hosted by Piers Morgan and developing a friendship over Twitter. It was later released in paperback form in the UK and North America.

In June 2016 St. Martin's Press published Lloyd Webber's The Intelligent Conversationalist: 31 Cheat Sheets That Will Show You How to Talk to Anyone About Anything, Anytime.

== Personal life ==
Lloyd Webber lives in New York City.
