= Monty Webber =

Monty Webber (born 1961, Sydney, Australia) is an Australian surfer, artist, writer and filmmaker. His stories and movies address the culture of surfing.

Monty is the third eldest of six boys, all of whom are recognised in the surfing world for their creative and innovative contributions to surf culture and surfboard design.

Monty completed a Diploma of Fine Arts at East Sydney Technical College in 1981. In 1982 he received an apprenticeship grant from the visual arts board to work alongside sculptor Michael Snape. He held his first solo exhibition of sculptures at the Australian Centre for Photography in 1986. He went on to exhibit drawings, paintings, photographs and sculptures throughout the 1980s.

In the 80s and 90s he produced and directed a series of surfing films for surfboard and clothing companies, including Insight and O'Neil. He shot and edited Sarge's Surfing Scrapbook volumes 6,7 & 8. He also worked as a professional cameraman and water-cameraman on surfing movies, documentaries and music videos.

Monty began contributing written articles to Tracks Surfing Magazine in 1988. He has been a freelance contributor to Tracks for over 30 years. He has also written for Waves, Underground Surf and White Horses surfing magazines.

He self-published his first collection of short stories 'Random Rogues and Ratbag Tales' in 2012 and followed up with 'Tripping Yarns' and 'Diagnose This' in 2015. He self-published his first two novellas 'We were on Fire' and 'Highway 101' in 2016.

Monty filmed and directed two short surfing documentaries, 'Journey On' (2013) and 'Tsunami Brothers' (2019).

Monty self published his first novel 'Purple Patch' in 2021. In 2022 he self published 'Purple Patch 2' and also self published his Bondi Memoir 'Bondi Days'.

== Works ==
=== Books ===
- Purple Patch. 2021. Novel/Fiction. The adventures of a surfboard and its many different owners.

=== Movies ===
- Tsunami Brothers, (dir) 2019. 10 min documentary short, Tracks Magazine. https://vimeo.com/374336920
- Journey On, (dir) 2013. 11 min documentary short about surfer Shane Herring, won first place at the Yew-Australia and New Zealand Short Film Festival. https://www.youtube.com/watch?v=0YGBxwIYnqw
- Liquid Time, (dir/camera) 2003. 20 min Arthouse film of waves made in collaboration with his brother, Greg Webber. Winner cinematography award at the Saint Jean de Luz International Surf Film Festival. https://vimeo.com/11163515
- Rise. 2001. 60 min surf film featuring Mick Fanning, Joel Parkinson, Dave Rastovitch, Trent Munro, Will Webber.https://www.youtube.com/watch?v=I3jYvROCIyE
- Five North Swells. 1999. 50 min surf film featuring Mick Fanning, Joel Parkinson. Trent Munro, Daniel Ross, Baddy Trelore, Will Webber, Cheyne Horan, Laurie Towner.https://vimeo.com/187300624
- Comeback. 1998. 50 min comedy/drama. Starring Rob Shaffer and Will Webber.
- Liquid Planet. 1992. 50 min O'Neill surfing movie. Featuring Shane Herring, Matt Hoy, Michael Rommelse, David Davidson.https://www.youtube.com/watch?v=LDnlyO_ufDo
- Bon Dia Bondi. 1991. 10 min documentary short. Co directed/produced with Michael Power.https://www.youtube.com/watch?v=l6pbhIk9ORM
- Bondi Surf Culture. 1986. 20 min surfing movie. Featuring David Davidson, Will Webber, Cheyne Horan, Matt Branson.https://www.youtube.com/watch?v=Jhc_IgQP2kE
- ITN Surf Combat. 1985. 20 min surfing movie shot in Bali and Java. Featuring Spot Anderson. Co produced with Dan Webber.
- Bondi Madness. 1984. 20 min art-house surf culture film.

=== Music videos/Surf clips ===
- Ty Segall https://www.youtube.com/watch?v=WRCd7WoIINk
- The Hunchbacks https://www.youtube.com/watch?v=TsN2KJOkZAw
- The Island https://www.youtube.com/watch?v=VKH8L_caOZw
- Circle https://www.youtube.com/watch?v=QfQKu9dwZQY
- Baddy https://www.tracksmag.com.au/video/baddy-treloar-and-angourie-523201
- Mike Caen/Louis Green https://www.tracksmag.com.au/video/watchread-a-time-of-wonder-in-g-land-567452
- Will Webber https://www.youtube.com/watch?v=FMOf8mOZutE

=== Magazines articles ===
- Tracks surfing magazine
- Waves
- Underground Surf
- White Horses

=== Collections of short stories. ===
- Webber, Monty (2012). Random Rogues and Ratbag Tales. CreateSpace Independent Publishing Platform. ISBN 978-1479334537.https://www.amazon.com.au/Random-Rogues-Ratbag-Tales-Webber/dp/1532898223/ref=sr_1_2?dchild=1&keywords=monty+webber&qid=1632098639&sr=8-2
- Webber, Monty (2015). Diagnose This. CreateSpace Independent Publishing Platform. ISBN 978-1532928680.https://www.amazon.com.au/Diagnose-This-Monty-Webber/dp/1532928688/ref=sr_1_5?dchild=1&keywords=monty+webber&qid=1632098639&sr=8-5
- Webber, Monty (2015). Tripping Yarns. CreateSpace Independent Publishing Platform. ISBN 978-1532897405.https://www.amazon.com.au/Tripping-Yarns-Monty-Webber/dp/1532897405/ref=sr_1_3?dchild=1&keywords=monty+webber&qid=1632098639&sr=8-3
- Webber, Monty (2016). We Were on Fire. CreateSpace Independent Publishing Platform. ISBN 978-1532862359.https://www.amazon.com.au/We-Were-Fire-Monty-Webber/dp/1532862350/ref=sr_1_6?dchild=1&keywords=monty+webber&qid=1632098639&sr=8-6
- Webber, Monty (2016). Highway One O One. CreateSpace Independent Publishing Platform. ISBN 978-1533171092.https://www.amazon.com.au/Highway-One-Monty-Webber/dp/1533171092/ref=sr_1_4?dchild=1&keywords=monty+webber&qid=1632098639&sr=8-4
