= Ebbert Webber =

American photojournalist and writer

Ebbert True "Bert" Webber (22 October 1921 - 25 March 2006) was an American research photojournalist, author and publisher whose work concentrated on the history of the Pacific Northwest.

== Biography ==
Webber was the eldest son of Matthew Ebbert Webber and Mary Elizabeth True. Born October 22, 1921, at Edgewood Arsenel, Maryland, he lived briefly in St. Louis, Missouri, but the family migrated to San Francisco, California, where they settled permanently.

He first entered business as a "San Francisco News Boy" hawking newspapers on street corners. He joined the school Journalism Club, and quickly found that he could "be where the action was" by acting as a reporter. It was not long before he discovered the photographic aspect of journalism. Together with a few carefully chosen words, he discovered the power of self-validating photographs.

Webber joined the U.S. Army just before World War II where he first trained as a fighter pilot, then as a photographer specializing in aerial reconnaissance.

He married Marjorie Jean Renfroe (born 1923) in Seattle, Washington, on July 9, 1944. The couple had four children. Webber set up "Webber Photo Supply" shop in Sedro-Woolley, Washington. The original scope of the shop was to provide contract professional photography services throughout the region as well as retail of cameras, consumable photography supplies, negative developing and printing. During this period, he was also a stringer for the Seattle Post Intelligencer

Among many others, contract photography topics included the ongoing Seattle City Light project to build a series of hydroelectric generating stations on the Skagit River, which flowed past Sedro-Wooley. He regularly drove up to Newhalem, Washington, to the Gorge Dam and Diablo Dam - the site of one of his more memorable images of the "Skagit River Inclined Railway". From there it was another 4.5 miles upstream to the site of the nearly complete Ross Dam, where he took the next series of "Construction Progress" photos.

In 1955, "Webber Photo Supply" business closed and Webber went to work selling office equipment for Remington Rand in Seattle. He was transferred to Lewiston, Idaho.

Health problems from his time in the Army forced a transfer to Spokane, Washington, in 1960, where he could get appropriate care at a Veterans' Administration hospital. Never having used his GI bill education benefits, the opportunity to formally study journalism at Whitworth College near Spokane arose and he took full advantage of it. He graduated in June, 1965, with a BS degree in journalism and secondary education., and followed this with a master's degree in library science (research) from the University of Portland in Portland, Oregon which he gained in 1968. While studying for the latter, he was also teaching Pacific Northwest History at Waluga Junior High School in Lake Oswego, Oregon and started publishing articles about the Pacific Northwest. He then moved south to become a school librarian in Medford, Oregon.

However, while teaching, Webber had noticed a lack of publications on Northwestern history. After a while, he therefore switched careers to writing and research about this and related topics, writing or cowriting (often with his wife) a total of 86 books between 1967 and 2003, on topics such as the Oregon Trail, Japanese attacks on the Northwest during World War II, the Oregon coast and other features of Northwestern history such as the DeAutremont attempted train robbery and the rise and decline of Bayocean. He established Webb Research Group - Publishers, and its companion book distribution company Pacific Northwest Books Company.

Webber's papers are in the Hoover Institution Archive at Stanford University.

== Selected bibliography ==
- Retaliation: Japanese Attacks and Allied Countermeasures on the Pacific Coast in World War II. Oregon State Monographs: Studies in History. Oregon State University Press. 1975. ISBN 0-87071-076-1., republished as Silent Siege - Japanese Attacks on North America in World War II. Fairfield, WA: Ye Galleon Press. 1984. ISBN 0-87770-318-3.
- Beachcombing and camping along the Northwest coast. Fairfield, WA: Ye Galleon Press. 1978. ISBN 0-87770-192-X.
- Silent Siege II: Japanese Attacks on North America in World War II. Ye Galleon Pr. 1984. ISBN 0-936738-26-X.
- The Rajneesh and the U.S. Postal Service. Medford, OR: Webb Research Group. 1988. ISBN 0-936738-29-4.
- Bayocean: the Oregon town that fell into the sea [documentary]. Medford, OR: Webb Research Group. c. 1989. ISBN 0-936738-40-5.
- Silent Siege III: Japanese Attacks on North America in World War II : Ships Sunk, Air Raids, Bombs Dropped, Civilians Killed : Documentary. Medford, OR: Webb Research Group. c. 1992. ISBN 0-936738-74-X.
- Indians along the Oregon Trail: the tribes of Nebraska, Wyoming, Idaho, Oregon and Washington identified. Medford, OR: Webb Research Group. c. 1992. ISBN 0-936738-60-X.
- The lure of Medford: an Oregon documentary. Medford, OR: Webb Research Group. c. 1996. ISBN 0-936738-47-2.
