= Cape Meares Light =

Lighthouse in the U.S. state of Oregon

Cape Meares Lighthouse
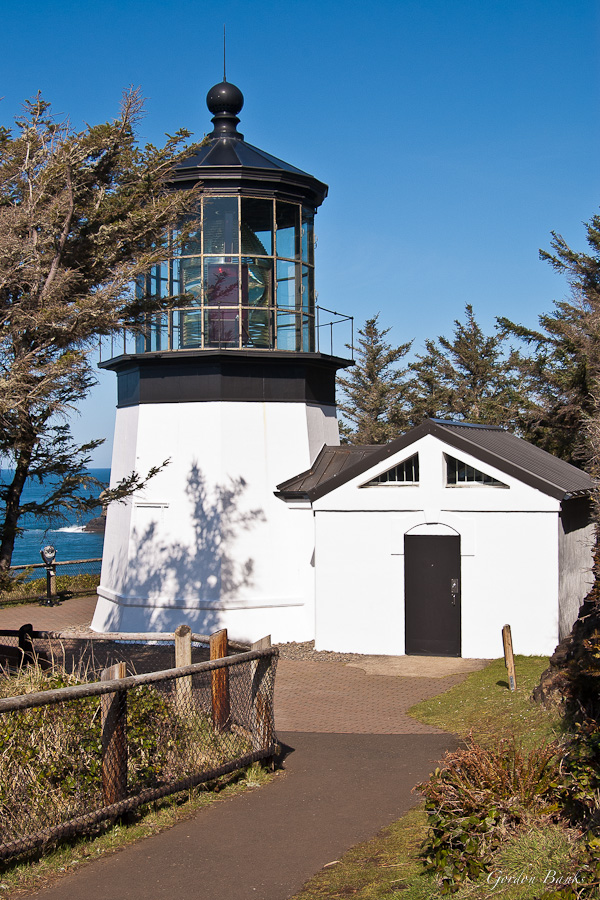
- Location: Cape Meares, Tillamook County, United States
- Coordinates: 45°29′11″N 123°58′42″W

Tower
- Construction: concrete (foundation), brick (tower), cast iron (cladding)
- Height: 38 ft (12 m)
- Shape: octagon
- Heritage: National Register of Historic Places listed place

Light
- First lit: 1 January 1890
- Deactivated: 1963, 25 June 2014
- Lens: first order Fresnel lens
- Range: 21 nmi (39 km; 24 mi)
- Characteristic: Fl W 15s (1934–)
- Cape Meares Lighthouse
- U.S. National Register of Historic Places
- MPS: Lighthouse Stations of Oregon MPS
- NRHP reference No.: 73002341
- Added to NRHP: April 21, 1993

The Cape Meares Light is an inactive lighthouse on the coast of Oregon. It is located on Cape Meares just south of Tillamook Bay. It is open to the public.

== History ==
Built in 1890, Cape Meares Light served as the light station for Tillamook Bay. When it was built, the lighthouse complex included two keeper's houses, two oil houses, and two cisterns, and was connected to the light by a 1,000-foot (300 m) boardwalk. Later additions included an attached workroom in 1895 and a garage in 1934. The light itself was iron-plated, and due to its exposure to the elements, it required frequent repainting over the years. No foghorn was ever installed at Cape Meares. In 1934, the light received electricity. Now unnecessary, the oil houses were removed.

In 1963, the lighthouse was deactivated and replaced by a newer tower. The following year, the Coast Guard made plans to demolish the light. However, due to public outcry, the plans fell through, and the Coast Guard turned the station over to Tillamook County. The light remained vacant until 1968, when the site was turned over to the Oregon State Parks Department. During this time, vandalism became a major problem for the light. Eventually, the vandalism took its toll on the keeper's quarters and they were subsequently demolished. Among the damage, four of the bulls-eyes in the Fresnel lens were stolen. That same year, the light was opened up to the public and the light was restored, with the exception of the missing bulls-eyes. Since then, three of the four missing bulls-eyes have been recovered. The bull's-eye of Cape Meares Light produced light visible for 21 miles. Four sides of the 8-sided lens were covered with red glass, which produced an alternating red and white beam as the light turned. In 1980, the tower itself was opened to the public.

The structure was listed on the National Register of Historic Places in 1993.

The U.S. Coast Guard permanently switched off Cape Meares Light (LLNR 675) on Wednesday, June 25, 2014, as it is no longer considered necessary for safe navigation of the seacoast.

== 2010 vandalism ==
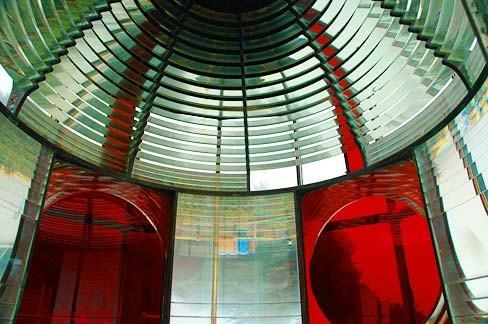
Lens of the lighthouse in 2006

Between January 9–10, 2010, vandals drove a vehicle down a blocked road to a lighthouse viewing area, firing rounds that shattered 15 windows and badly damaged the historic Fresnel lens created in Paris in 1888, with repair costs later estimated at over $500,000. Additional shots struck an inactive Coast Guard light and equipment, and the suspects also tore up nearby grassland.

Two Oceanside men, Zachary Jon Pyle (23) and David Regin Wilks Jr. (26), were arrested a month later. Initially, a $1,000 reward was offered, which grew to $6,000 by the time of their arrest. Both men, who admitted being drunk, were convicted and ordered to pay $100,000 in restitution and serve three 16-day jail terms over three years—each beginning on December 27, the anniversary of the vandalism. The two men stated it was the dumbest thing they had ever done.

== In popular culture ==
The Cape Meares Light has served as inspiration for the lighthouse featured in the fictional town of Arcadia Bay from the 2015 narrative adventure video game Life Is Strange.

== See also ==
- List of lighthouses on the Oregon Coast
- National Register of Historic Places listings in Tillamook County, Oregon
