= Ecola State Park =

State park in Oregon, United States

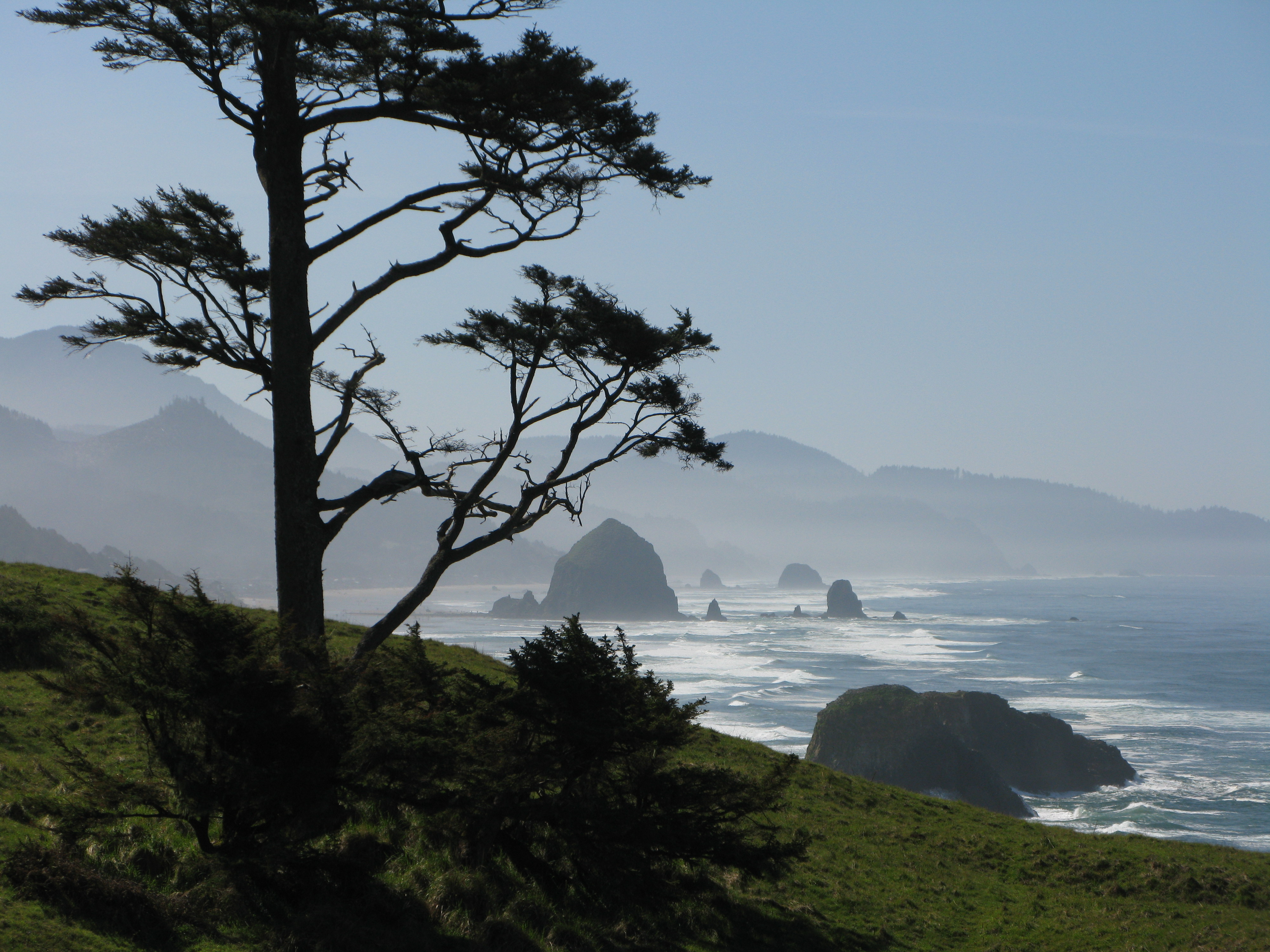
- Southern view of the coast from Ecola State Park with Haystack Rock in the distance.

- Location within Oregon
- Location: Clatsop County, Oregon, United States
- Nearest city: Cannon Beach
- Coordinates: 45°55′06″N 123°58′48″W
- Area: 1,023 acres (414 ha)
- Operator: Oregon Parks and Recreation Department
- Website: Ecola State Park

Ecola State Park is a state park located approximately 3 miles (4.8 km) north of Cannon Beach in Clatsop County in the U.S. state of Oregon on the Oregon Coast. It is administered by the Oregon Parks and Recreation Department. The park was home to the Tillamook and Clatsop for millennia before European colonization. It takes the name Ecola from a nearby creek, given a Chinook Jargon name meaning 'whale' by members of the Lewis and Clark Expedition. The park is included as part of Lewis and Clark National Historical Park, though separate entrance fees are charged.

The park encompasses 9 miles (14 km) of coastline between Cannon Beach and Seaside and includes Tillamook Head. Included within the park are 8 miles (13 km) of the Oregon Coast Trail. Ecola State Park is popular with tourists on the Oregon coast, averaging 500,000 visitors per year. Scenes from several movies have been filmed at Indian Beach and other park locations.

== History ==
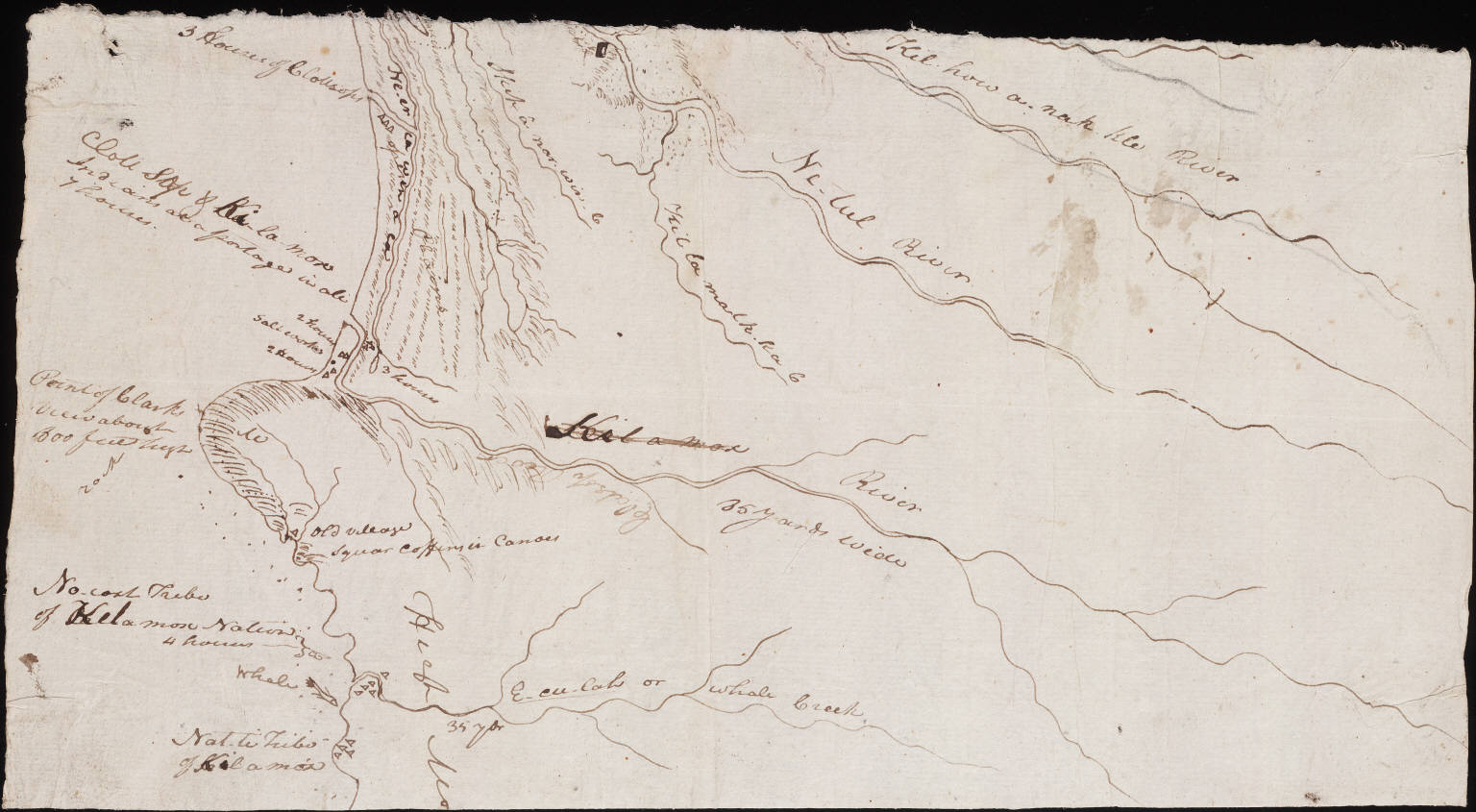
A map from the Lewis and Clark expedition depicting today's Ecola State Park in 1806

The coastline of Ecola State Park consists primarily of 15 million year old lava flows and sedimentary deposits from an earlier extent of the Columbia River. Archaeological sites within the park dating to as early as 1100 CE demonstrate continued use by the Nehalem-Tillamook and Clatsop people. The population in the area consumed a diet of fish, shellfish, and aquatic mammals, as well as larger game animals in the woods off the shore.

In January 1806, William Clark and other members of the Corps of Discovery traveled through the area in search of a beached whale and saw burial canoes of the Nehalem-Tillamook at the village of Necost. The site they called Indian Beach had been home to a Nehalem-Tillamook village depopulated by smallpox and made into a burial ground. Clark named a creek nearby Ecola for the beached whale, a Chinook Jargon word meaning "whale." The word is typically spelled ehkoli in 19th century dictionaries and ikuli in the Confederated Tribes of the Grand Ronde dialect. The name of the creek was later applied to other nearby geographical features, including the state park. Clark summited Tillamook Head, reaching the point now designated as Clark's Mountain and remarking "...from this point I beheld the grandest and most pleasing prospects which my eyes ever surveyed...". The village of Necost, where Clark and other members of the expedition bartered for whale blubber, marked the southernmost point reached by the Corps of Discovery.

In 1866, the U.S. Lighthouse Board proposed a lighthouse reservation on Tillamook Head, the central headland of Ecola State Park. Despite congressional allocations, the unfitness of the site for navigation removed it from consideration. Despite this, parts of Tillamook Head remained federal property. At the start of the 20th century, prominent Portland business leaders, including Rodney Glisan, established home sites in the Ecola area. Over 450 acres (180 ha) of land were transferred to Oregon's state park system by the landowners in the area in the 1930s, with the park officially created in 1932, whereupon recreation facilities were created by the Civilian Conservation Corps.

The federal land on Tillamook Head was used as a radar facility in World War II, lasting until 1948. The land was acquired by the Oregon government in 1951, part of broader expansion efforts in the area that included purchases from the Crown Zellerbach Corporation lumber interests. Expansion via purchase of abutting private property continued until 1978, when the park reached its present size of 1,032 acres (418 ha). The Oregon Coast Trail, a National Recreation Trail that spans the length of the park, was dedicated in 1972. Several landslides, including two large slides in 1962 and 1975, have eroded some of the original recreation areas within the boundaries of Ecola State Park.

== Archaeology ==
Two ground level air intake pillars of the Tillamook Head World War II Radar Station (Site J-23)

Multiple archaeological sites located within park boundaries were added to the National Register of Historic Places in 1997.

=== Bald Point Site ===
The Bald Point Site (Smithsonian trinomial: 35CLT23) features a shell midden and possible house pit, dating to ca. 1550 CE. Associated with the Tillamook people, it has the potential to yield information related to environmental change in the Oregon Coast region, settlement and subsistence patterns, emergence of ethnographic patterns among coastal people, baseline cultural patterns prior to the arrival of European Americans, and other topics. Parts of the site have been lost to coastal erosion since the first scientific investigations in 1976, but the remaining portions appear mostly secure.

=== Ecola Point Site ===
At the Ecola Point Site (Smithsonian trinomial: 35CLT21), several ground depressions have been interpreted by researchers as house pits, indicating the presence of a semipermanent village. Two dense shell middens have preserved extensive faunal remains, along with other artifacts. Radiocarbon dates taken at the site roughly span a period from ca. 1100 CE to ca. 1700 CE. The site has the potential to yield information related to environmental change in the Oregon Coast region, settlement and subsistence patterns, emergence of ethnographic patterns among coastal people, the change in cultural patterns from before to after contact with European Americans, and other topics.

== Filming location ==
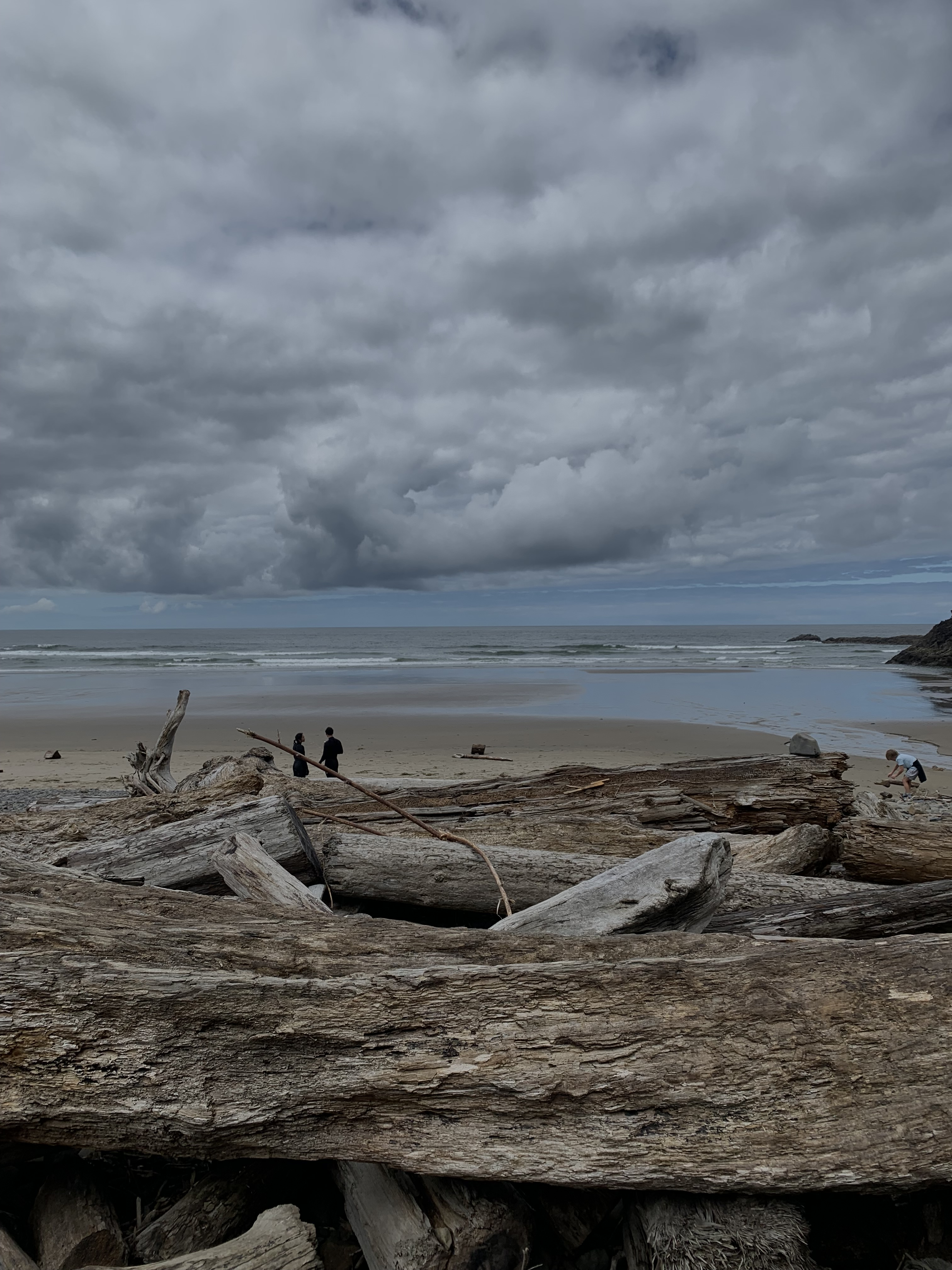
Indian Beach at Ecola State Park, a filming location for several movies

Much of the 1985 film The Goonies was filmed within the park, as was the school picnic scene in Kindergarten Cop. Indian Beach was the filming location for the time-jumping final act of Point Break, and several scenes of Twilight. The park also appeared in Free Willy including several scenes where it served as the exterior background of the Northwest Adventure Park's aquatic theater. In reality, the tank was filmed at the former Reino Aventura in Tlalpan, Mexico.

== See also ==
- Lewis and Clark Expedition
- List of Oregon state parks
- National Register of Historic Places listings in Clatsop County, Oregon
