= Andrea Carmichael =

Andrea Carmichael may refer to:

- A character from the TV series Glee, portrayed by Earlene Davis
- A character from the 1985 film The Goonies, portrayed by Kerri Green
