= The Goonies (Famicom video game) =

1986 video game

- Japanese Famicom box art by Noriyoshi Ohrai
- Developer: Konami
- Publishers: Konami; Nintendo (arcade)
- Composer: Satoe Terashima
- Platforms: Famicom, arcade, Famicom Disk System, PC-8801, X1, MSX
- Release: February 21, 1986: Famicom; JP: February 21, 1986 PC-8801, X1; JP: October 23, 1986 MSX; JP: October 23, 1986; EU: 1986 Arcade, PC-10; NA: 1986 Famicom Disk System; JP: April 8, 1988
- Genre: Platform
- Mode: Single-player
- Arcade system: Nintendo VS. System, PlayChoice-10

The Goonies (Note: Japanese: グーニーズ, Hepburn: Gūnīzu) is a 1986 platform game developed and published by Konami for the Family Computer, based on the 1985 film of the same name.

== Gameplay ==
=== Player ===
In the computer versions, the player plays as Sloth. In the Famicom and arcade versions, the main character is unnamed, only referred to as "Player" in the instruction manual.

=== Controls ===
The player defends himself with a kick, bombs (whose explosions are instantly fatal if he is hit), and a slingshot (found randomly behind doors). The player can find diamonds, restoring his life meter to full if he collects eight. He can also find upgrades that protect him against various hazards such as a firesuit that protects against flames and a set of earmuffs that protect against the music notes cast out by one of the Fratelli brothers.

=== Stages ===
Screenshot of the restaurant stage

In the computer versions, the entire game takes place exclusively in the caverns. The player goes through 25 interconnected and non-linear levels searching for the Goonies.

The Famicom version roughly follows the film, with stages resembling the restaurant, caverns and a pirate ship. The ending also recreates one scene from the film where the Goonies are on a beach watching The Inferno ship sail away. Throughout the journey, the player has to find three keys and one Goonie for each level. He does so by using bombs to blow open the doors concealing them. The player can advance to next level after finding the three keys, but in order to really "finish" the game, he must also free all the Goonies to access the game's final level (The Pirate Ship). Otherwise, the game will restart from the first level.

=== Enemies ===
An army of rats patrols the stages frequently. There are three kinds of rats: red, yellow, and white. Red ones need one hit with kick/slingshot, while the yellow ones need two. White rats take one hit like red, but drop a cross granting temporary invincibility. A Fratelli makes an appearance and attempts to attack the player by shooting at him and spreading music notes at him. The Fratellis cannot be killed, even by bombs; they can only be stunned. After a while, they will get up and continue chasing the player (if still on screen), but if they are stunned while jumping over a pit, they will fall into it.

== Development ==
Konami also developed a completely different version for the MSX in Japan. First released on cartridge, it was later re-released in Disk System format in 1988. The game was ported to PC-88 and Sharp X-1. Although the game was never sold in retail in North America, Nintendo published an arcade port in North America for the VS. System (a coin-operated platform which runs on the same hardware as the NES) under the title VS. The Goonies and it was also available as a PlayChoice-10 title in the region.

The theme "The Goonies 'R' Good Enough" by Cyndi Lauper, featured in the beginning of the Famicom title and its sequel, was remixed by Tomoyuki Uchida for Pop n' Music 10, from Konami's Bemani Series. The theme retains its original 8-bit song from the NES with added drum and bass beats.

The three hidden items, Konami Man, Vic Viper (from the Gradius series), and TwinBee, would reappear in Castlevania: Portrait of Ruin, as well as in Order of Ecclesia. The in-game description for these items is "5,000 points", which is what the player receives by catching it before it disappears.

== Sequel ==
A sequel was released titled The Goonies II, which saw a worldwide retail release in 1987.
