= Haystack Rock =

Sea stack on the coast of Oregon, United States

- Sea stack
- Haystack Rock and the Needles, Cannon Beach, 2026
- Interactive map of Haystack Rock
- Coordinates: 45°53′4″N 123°58′5″W
- Location: Cannon Beach, Oregon
- Water bodies: Pacific Ocean
- Age: 15-16 million years
- Formed by: Lava flows and erosion
- Operator: Various state and federal departments
- Elevation: 235 feet (72 m)

Haystack Rock is a 235 ft-tall (72 m) sea stack in Cannon Beach, Oregon. The monolithic rock is adjacent to the beach and accessible by foot at low tide. The Haystack Rock tide pools are home to many intertidal animals, including starfish, sea anemone, crabs, chitons, limpets, and sea slugs. The rock is also a nesting site for many sea birds, including terns and puffins.

== History ==
In 1968, a protrusion of a rock that was used as a ledge by those illegally climbing it was blasted off.

In 1990, Haystack Rock was granted Marine Garden status by the Oregon Department of Fish and Wildlife. The site is protected under the Oregon Islands National Wildlife Refuge as a designated wilderness area.

The sea stack formation was closed temporarily during July 2023 after a cougar was documented, for the first time, climbing on the rock in search of prey.

== Location and management ==
Haystack Rock is located about 1.5 miles (2.4 km) south of downtown Cannon Beach in Clatsop County and about 80 miles (129 km) west of Portland. The nearest major road is U.S. Route 101. Haystack Rock is part of the Tolovana Beach State Recreation Site.

The area below the mean high water (MHW) level is managed by Oregon Parks and Recreation. The area above the MHW level is managed by the Oregon Islands National Wildlife Refuge of the United States Fish and Wildlife Service.

== Geology ==
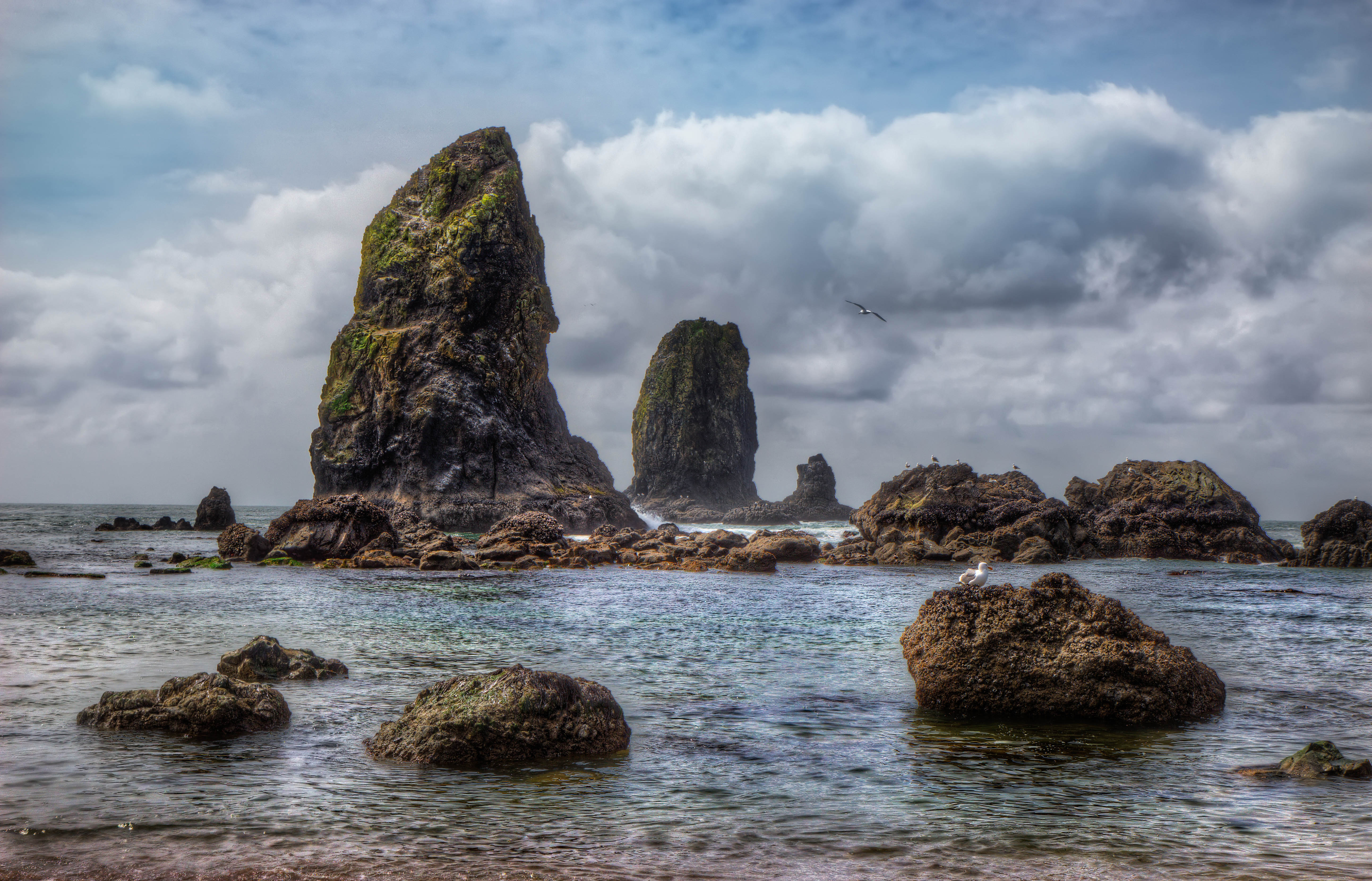
"The Needles" which are adjacent to Haystack Rock

Measuring 235 feet (72 m) tall, Haystack Rock is composed of basalt and was formed by lava flows emanating from the Blue Mountains and Columbia basin about 15-17 million years ago. The lava flows came from massive eruptions from a source believed to be what is now the Yellowstone volcanic hotspot, and created many of the Oregon coast's natural features. Haystack Rock was once joined to the coastline but years of erosion have since separated the monolith from the coast. Three smaller, adjacent rock formations to the south of Haystack Rock are collectively called "The Needles".

== Ecology ==
Collecting plants or animals is strictly prohibited and to protect nesting birds, climbing above the mean high tide level barnacle line is not allowed. The Haystack Rock Awareness Program is run by the City of Cannon Beach and conducts educational seminars at the rock during low tide between February and October.

A variety of bird species, such as pigeon guillemots, common murres, black oystercatchers, and tufted puffins, roost and nest on the rock, raising their young usually between March and September.

== Recreation ==
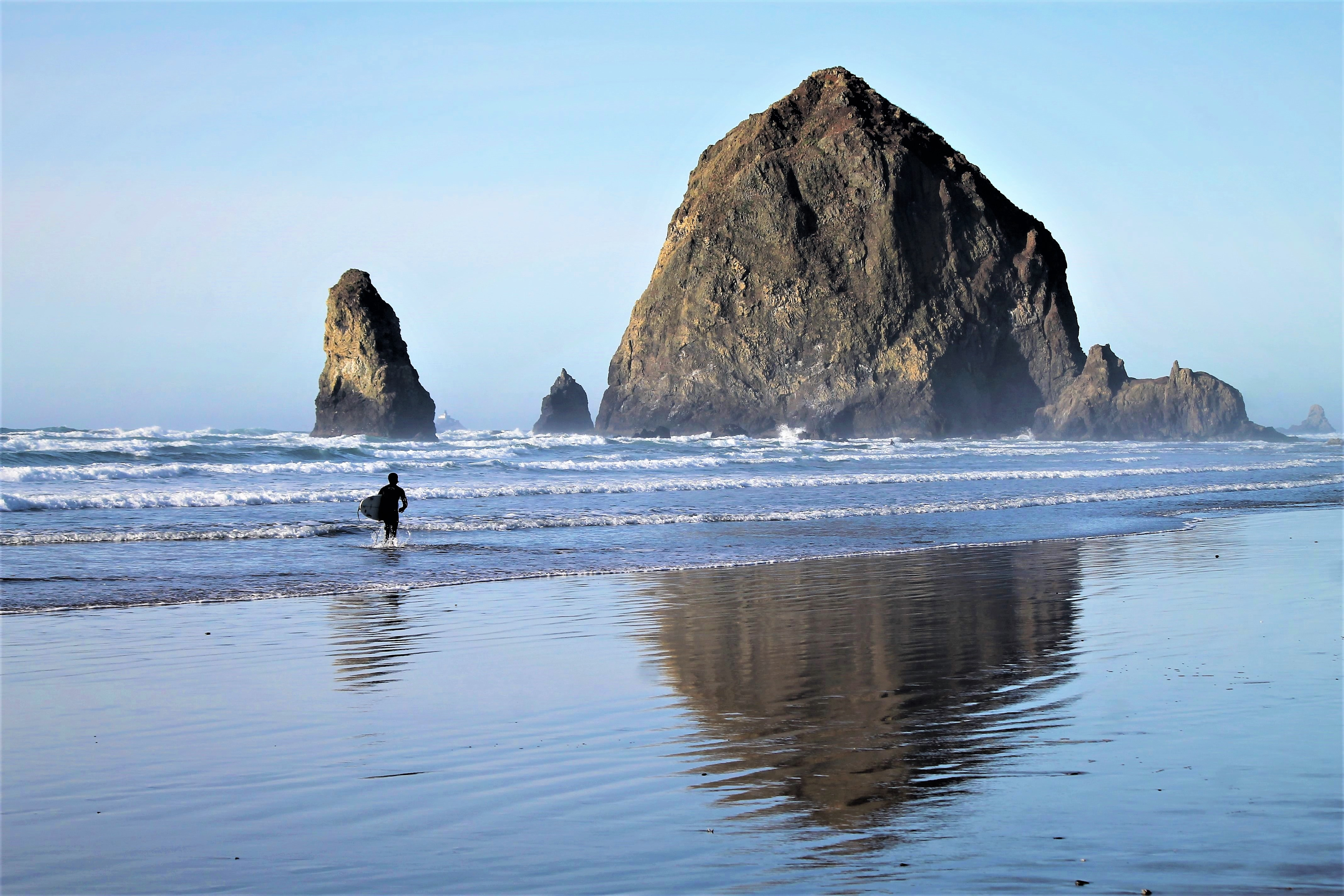
Surfer near Haystack Rock

Visitors to Haystack Rock can view many species of marine wildlife in their natural habitat during low tide. The thin strip of rock and sand that connects it to the beach at these times features many tide pools. The area surrounding the rock is popular for picnicking, kite-flying, and bird-watching. As of 2023, the rock averages an annual count of 350,000 visitors.

== Popular culture ==
Several movies have featured Haystack Rock prominently in their filming at Cannon Beach or nearby Ecola State Park, including The Goonies, Free Willy, Point Break, Twilight, 1941, and Kindergarten Cop.
