= Whale (sculpture) =

Sculpture in Cannon Beach, Oregon, U.S.

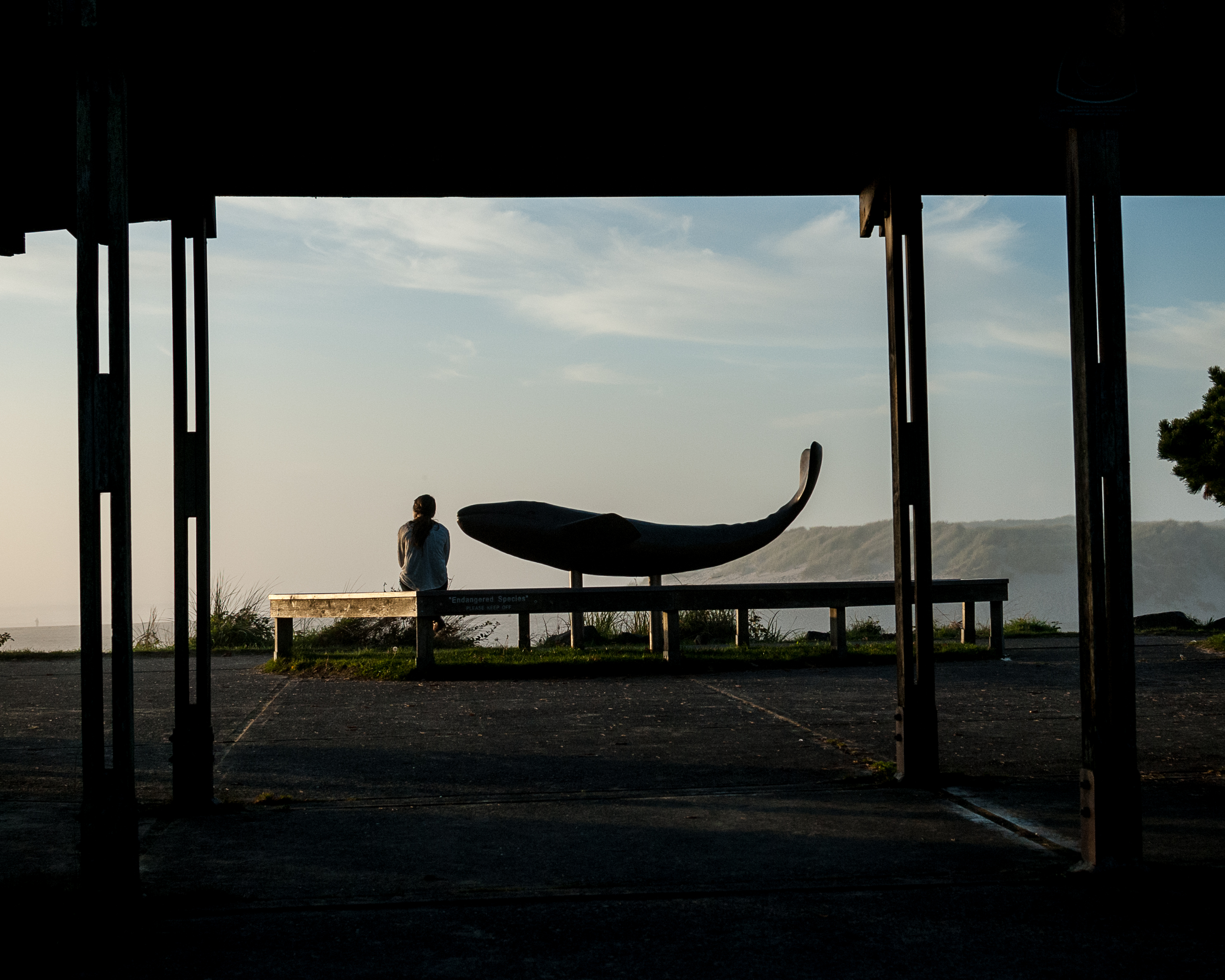
- The sculpture in 2013
- Type: Sculpture
- Medium: Cedar
- Subject: Whale
- Dimensions: 1.2 m × 1.1 m × 3.0 m (4 ft × 3.5 ft × 10 ft)
- Condition: "Treatment needed" (1993)
- Location: Cannon Beach, Oregon, United States; 45.90020°N 123.96115°W
- Owner: City of Cannon Beach

Whale is an outdoor wooden sculpture of a gray whale, located in Cannon Beach, Oregon, United States.

== Description ==
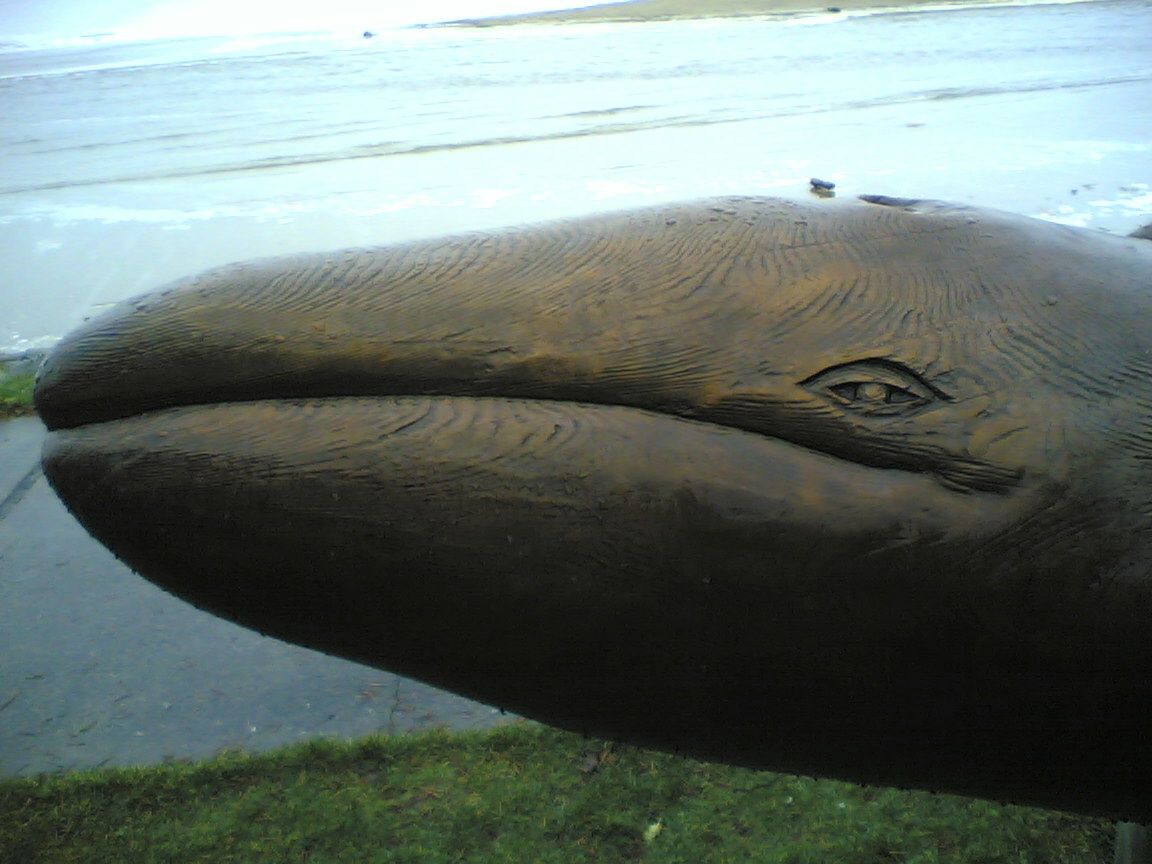
Detail of the whale

Whale is a 9-foot (2.7 m) sculpture installed at, and the namesake of, Whale Park (or Hemlock Street Park), located at the north end of downtown Cannon Beach. The sculpture commemorates the visit by members of the Lewis and Clark Expedition's Corps of Discovery in January 1806, including William Clark and Sacagawea, who explored the area to investigate reports of a beached whale. It measures 4 feet (1.2 m) x 3.5 feet (1.1 m) x 10 feet (3.0 m) and is positioned horizontally on top of two metal posts anchored in a concrete base which is 2 feet (0.61 m) tall. The whale's head and tail are elevated. The underside of its proper right flipper contains an unintelligible signature by the artist which may read "Hartwick". The original artist that carved the wood sculpture was Gregory Alan Hartwick.

The original cedar sculpture has since been replaced by a cast metal replica.

== History ==
The sculpture's condition was deemed "treatment needed" by the Smithsonian Institution's "Save Outdoor Sculpture!" program in November 1993. It was administered by the City of Cannon Beach at that time. Whale has been included in at least one published guided tour, called "Oregon's Coast, Mountains, Columbia River Gorge and Wine".
