= Cannon Beach, Oregon =

- City
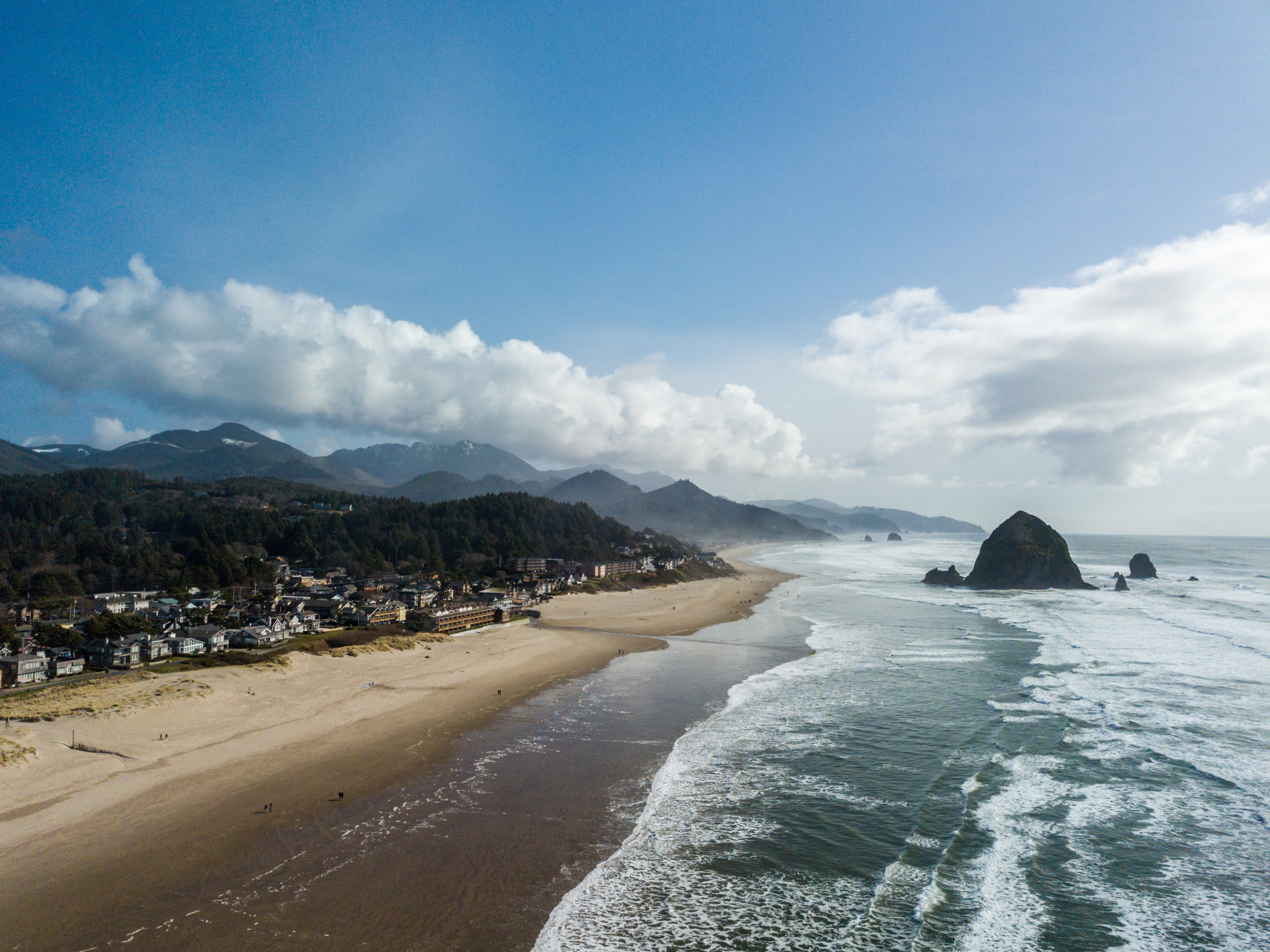
- An aerial view of Cannon Beach with Haystack Rock in the background

- Location in Oregon
- Coordinates: 45°52′55″N 123°57′34″W
- Country: United States
- State: Oregon
- County: Clatsop
- Incorporated: 1956

Government
  - Mayor: Barb Knop

Area
  - Total: 1.57 sq mi (4.07 km^{2})
  - Land: 1.57 sq mi (4.07 km^{2})
  - Water: 0 sq mi (0.00 km^{2})
- Elevation: 46 ft (14 m)

Population (2020)
  - Total: 1,489
  - Density: 948.0/sq mi (366.04/km^{2})
- Time zone: UTC-8 (Pacific)
  - Summer (DST): UTC-7 (Pacific)
- ZIP code: 97110
- Area code: 503
- FIPS code: 41-10850
- GNIS feature ID: 2409975
- Website: ci.cannon-beach.or.us

Cannon Beach// is a city in Clatsop County, Oregon, United States. As of the 2020 census, Cannon Beach had a population of 1,489. It is a popular coastal Oregon tourist destination, famous for Haystack Rock, a 235 ft (72 m) sea stack that juts out along the coast. In 2013, National Geographic listed it as "one of the world's 100 most beautiful places."

== History ==
Cannon Beach and its surrounding coast was previously settled by the Tillamook people.

William Clark, one of the leaders of the Lewis and Clark Expedition, journeyed to Cannon Beach in early 1805. The expedition was wintering at Fort Clatsop, roughly 20 miles (32 km) to the north near the mouth of the Columbia River. In December 1805, two members of the expedition returned to camp with blubber from a whale that had beached several miles south, near the mouth of Ecola Creek. Clark later explored the region himself. From a spot near the western cliffs of the headland he saw "...the grandest and most pleasing prospects which my eyes ever surveyed, in front of a boundless Ocean..." That viewpoint, later dubbed "Clark's Point of View," can be accessed by a hiking trail from Indian Beach in Ecola State Park.

Clark and several of his companions, including Sacagawea, completed a three-day journey on January 10, 1806, to the site of the beached whale. They encountered a group of Tillamook who were boiling blubber for storage. Clark and his party met with them and successfully bartered for 300 pounds (136 kg) of blubber and some whale oil before returning to Fort Clatsop. There is a whale sculpture commemorating the encounter between Clark's group and the Tillamooks in a small park at the northern end of Hemlock Street.

Clark applied the name Ekoli to the creek now spelled Ecola. Ekoli is a Chinook Jargon word for "whale". Early settlers later renamed the creek "Elk Creek", and a community with the same name formed nearby.

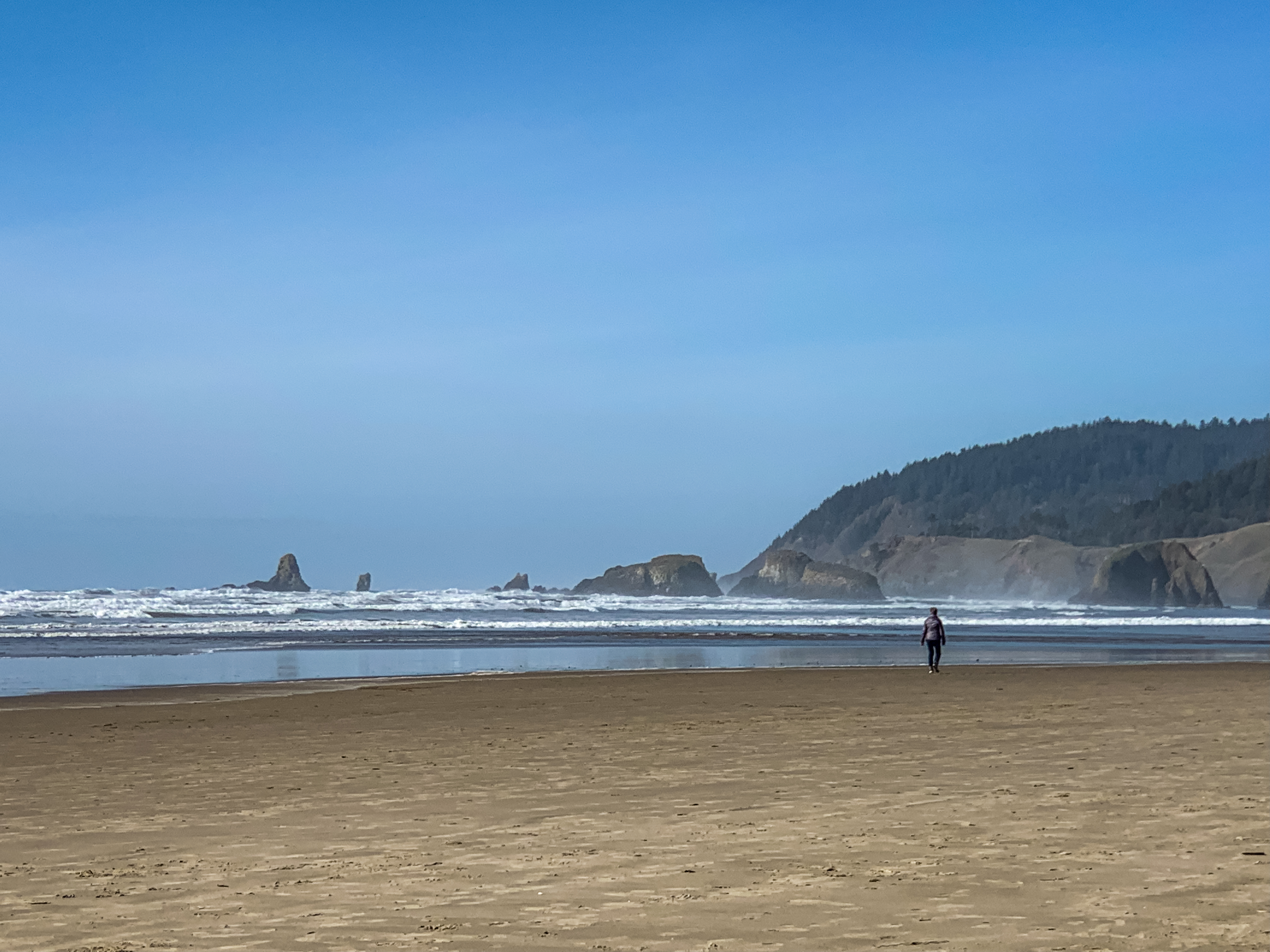
Looking northwest up the beach

In 1846, a carronade, a short naval cannon, from the US Navy schooner Shark, which had sunk earlier that year, washed ashore just north of Arch Cape, a few miles south of the community. The schooner hit land while attempting to cross the Columbia Bar, also known as the "Graveyard of the Pacific." The cannon, rediscovered in 1898, eventually inspired a name change for the growing community. In 1922, Elk Creek was renamed Cannon Beach (reflecting the 8-mile (13 km) beach that extends south of Ecola Creek to Arch Cape) at the insistence of the Post Office Department because the name was frequently confused with Eola. Elk Creek itself was renamed Ecola Creek to honor William Clark's original name.

The cannon is now housed in the city's museum and a replica of it can be seen alongside U.S. Route 101. Two more cannons, also believed to have been from the Shark, were discovered on Arch Cape over the weekend of February 16, 2008.

U.S. Highway 101 formerly ran through Cannon Beach. In 1964, a tsunami generated by the Good Friday earthquake came ashore along the coast of the Pacific Northwest. The subsequent flooding inundated parts of Cannon Beach and washed away the highway bridge located on the north side of city. The city, now isolated from the highway, decided to attract visitors by holding a sand castle contest, an event that still continues annually every June.

== Geography ==
According to the United States Census Bureau, the city has a total area of 1.54 square miles (3.99 km^{2}), all land. The Tolovana Park neighborhood is south of the downtown core, adjacent to Tolovana Beach State Recreation Site.

=== Climate ===
This region experiences mild, dry summers, with no average monthly temperatures above 71.6 °F (22.0 °C). According to the Köppen Climate Classification system, Cannon Beach has a warm-summer Mediterranean climate, abbreviated "Csb" on climate maps.

Climate data for Cannon Beach, Oregon
Month	Jan	Feb	Mar	Apr	May	Jun	Jul	Aug	Sep	Oct	Nov	Dec	Year
Record high °F (°C)	73 (23)	89 (32)	78 (26)	89 (32)	98 (37)	98 (37)	105 (41)	104 (40)	97 (36)	92 (33)	79 (26)	69 (21)	105 (41)
Mean daily maximum °F (°C)	49.4 (9.7)	51.2 (10.7)	53.5 (11.9)	56.4 (13.6)	60.2 (15.7)	63.3 (17.4)	66.9 (19.4)	67.8 (19.9)	67.0 (19.4)	60.3 (15.7)	52.6 (11.4)	48.3 (9.1)	58.1 (14.5)
Mean daily minimum °F (°C)	37.9 (3.3)	37.4 (3.0)	38.9 (3.8)	40.8 (4.9)	45.4 (7.4)	49.5 (9.7)	52.7 (11.5)	52.8 (11.6)	49.1 (9.5)	44.7 (7.1)	40.5 (4.7)	37.1 (2.8)	43.9 (6.6)
Record low °F (°C)	11 (−12)	9 (−13)	23 (−5)	24 (−4)	29 (−2)	36 (2)	35 (2)	38 (3)	31 (−1)	24 (−4)	14 (−10)	5 (−15)	5 (−15)
Average precipitation inches (mm)	10.96 (278)	9.64 (245)	8.52 (216)	5.72 (145)	3.95 (100)	3.06 (78)	1.56 (40)	1.38 (35)	3.04 (77)	6.21 (158)	11.47 (291)	12.07 (307)	77.58 (1,971)
Average snowfall inches (cm)	1.1 (2.8)	0.1 (0.25)	0.3 (0.76)	0 (0)	0 (0)	0 (0)	0 (0)	0 (0)	0 (0)	0 (0)	0 (0)	0.2 (0.51)	1.7 (4.3)

== Demographics ==
Historical population
Census	Pop.	Note	%±
1930	125		—
1940	125		0.0%
1950	125		0.0%
1960	495		296.0%
1970	779		57.4%
1980	1,187		52.4%
1990	1,221		2.9%
2000	1,588		30.1%
2010	1,690		6.4%
2020	1,489		−11.9%

=== 2020 census ===
As of the 2020 census, Cannon Beach had a population of 1,489. The median age was 53.2 years. 12.8% of residents were under the age of 18 and 32.3% of residents were 65 years of age or older. For every 100 females there were 83.8 males, and for every 100 females age 18 and over there were 85.0 males age 18 and over.

0% of residents lived in urban areas, while 100.0% lived in rural areas.

There were 705 households in Cannon Beach, of which 17.9% had children under the age of 18 living in them. Of all households, 43.7% were married-couple households, 17.7% were households with a male householder and no spouse or partner present, and 32.1% were households with a female householder and no spouse or partner present. About 35.2% of all households were made up of individuals and 18.0% had someone living alone who was 65 years of age or older.

There were 1,888 housing units, of which 62.7% were vacant. Among occupied housing units, 58.2% were owner-occupied and 41.8% were renter-occupied. The homeowner vacancy rate was 2.8% and the rental vacancy rate was 7.1%.

Racial composition as of the 2020 census
Race	Number	Percent
White	1,224	82.2%
Black or African American	3	0.2%
American Indian and Alaska Native	16	1.1%
Asian	16	1.1%
Native Hawaiian and Other Pacific Islander	2	0.1%
Some other race	81	5.4%
Two or more races	147	9.9%
Hispanic or Latino (of any race)	185	12.4%

=== 2010 census ===
As of the census of 2010, there were 1,690 people, 759 households, and 415 families residing in the city. The population density was 1,097.4 inhabitants per square mile (423.7/km^{2}). There were 1,812 housing units at an average density of 1,176.6 per square mile (454.3/km^{2}). The racial makeup of the city was 88.4% White, 0.1% African American, 0.4% Native American, 0.4% Asian, 0.2% Pacific Islander, 9.1% from other races, and 1.5% from two or more races. Hispanic or Latino of any race were 12.7% of the population.

There were 759 households, of which 19.1% had children under the age of 18 living with them, 45.1% were married couples living together, 7.4% had a female householder with no husband present, 2.2% had a male householder with no wife present, and 45.3% were non-families. 38.1% of all households were made up of individuals, and 13.3% had someone living alone who was 65 years of age or older. The average household size was 2.07 and the average family size was 2.70.

The median age in the city was 46.4 years. 16.4% of residents were under the age of 18; 12.3% were between the ages of 18 and 24; 20% were from 25 to 44; 31.6% were from 45 to 64; and 19.8% were 65 years of age or older. The gender makeup of the city was 46.0% male and 54.0% female.

=== 2000 census ===
As of the census of 2000, there were 1,588 people, 710 households, and 418 families residing in the city. The population density was 1,066.8 inhabitants per square mile (411.9/km^{2}). There were 1,641 housing units at an average density of 1,102.4 per square mile (425.6/km^{2}). The racial makeup of the city was 92.57% White, 0.19% African American, 0.88% Native American, 0.31% Asian, 3.27% from other races, and 2.77% from two or more races. Hispanic or Latino of any race were 10.52% of the population. 17.2% were of German, 12.6% English, 11.4% Irish and 5.7% American ancestry according to Census 2000.

There were 710 households, out of which 20.8% had children under the age of 18 living with them, 49.0% were married couples living together, 7.3% had a female householder with no husband present, and 41.0% were non-families. 33.5% of all households were made up of individuals, and 13.0% had someone living alone who was 65 years of age or older. The average household size was 2.11 and the average family size was 2.70.

In the city, the population was spread out, with 17.4% under the age of 18, 12.3% from 18 to 24, 21.5% from 25 to 44, 32.1% from 45 to 64, and 16.7% who were 65 years of age or older. The median age was 44 years. For every 100 females, there were 86.8 males. For every 100 females age 18 and over, there were 84.4 males.

The median income for a household in the city was $39,271, and the median income for a family was $45,329. Males had a median income of $31,250 versus $21,641 for females. The per capita income for the city was $24,465. About 8.2% of families and 12.0% of the population were below the poverty line, including 16.3% of those under age 18 and 2.1% of those age 65 or over.

== Economy ==
Cannon Beach is a tourist resort destination, particularly popular as a weekend getaway with residents from Portland, Oregon.

Chain stores such as Safeway and McDonald's have been discouraged from building in Cannon Beach in order to preserve the local economy and small-town feel.

Artisan shops and local restaurants line the streets of the town.

== Arts and culture ==
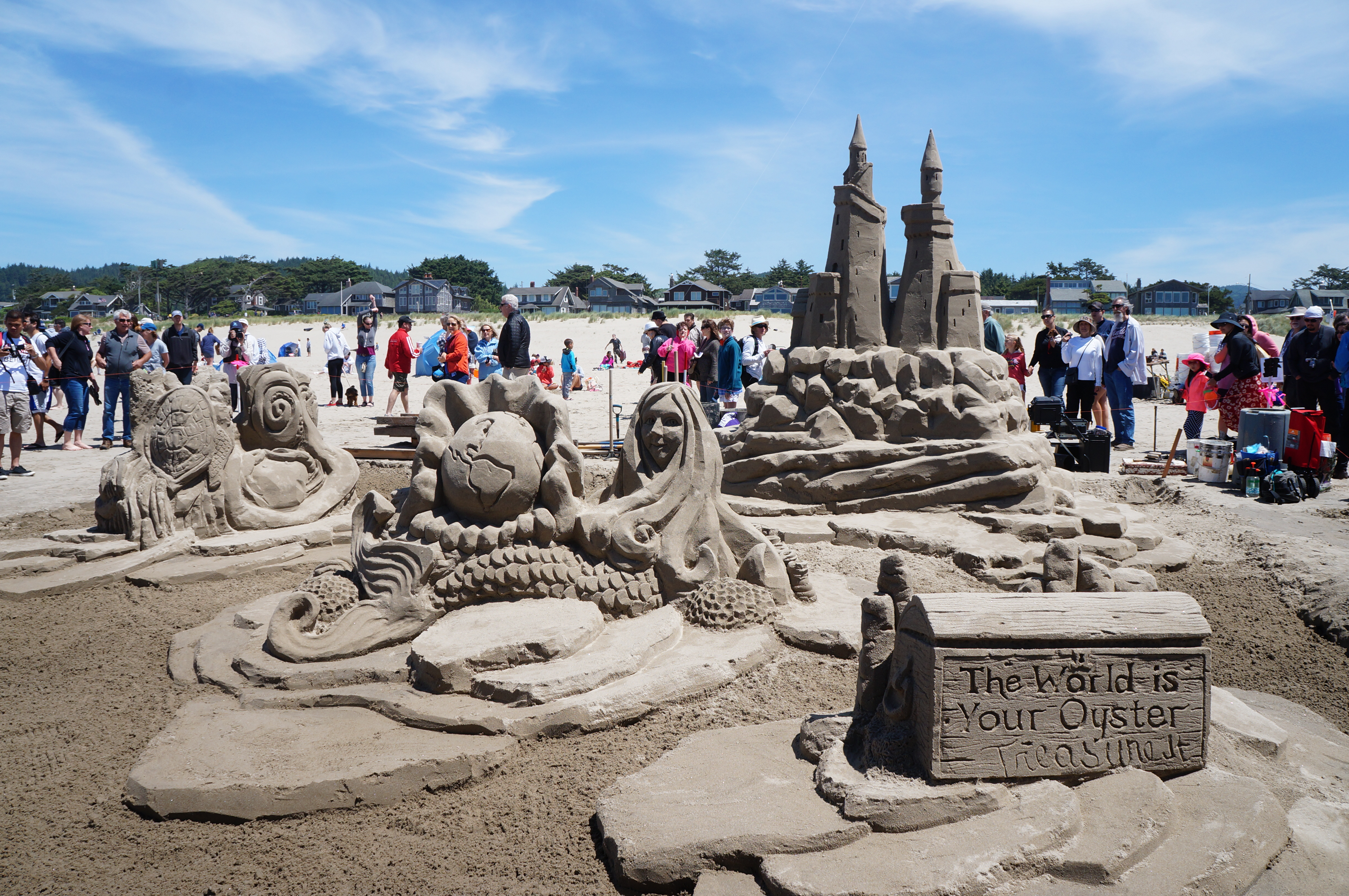
In June, Cannon Beach hosts an annual sand castle–building contest

=== Annual cultural events ===
In June, the city hosts an annual sand castle-building contest.

The city also hosts an annual Fourth of July parade. Parades in recent years have featured a military flyover and a "Lawn Chair Brigade".

"Spring Unveiling" is an annual arts festival, held on the first Sunday in May, hosted by the city's galleries.

There is an annual late-fall festival called the Stormy Weather Arts Festival, held in November, where artists from across the Pacific Northwest showcase their artwork in the local galleries. Artwork is available for purchase in an auction held at the end of the event.

Several galleries in town feature the works of local and Northwest artists.

== Parks and recreation ==
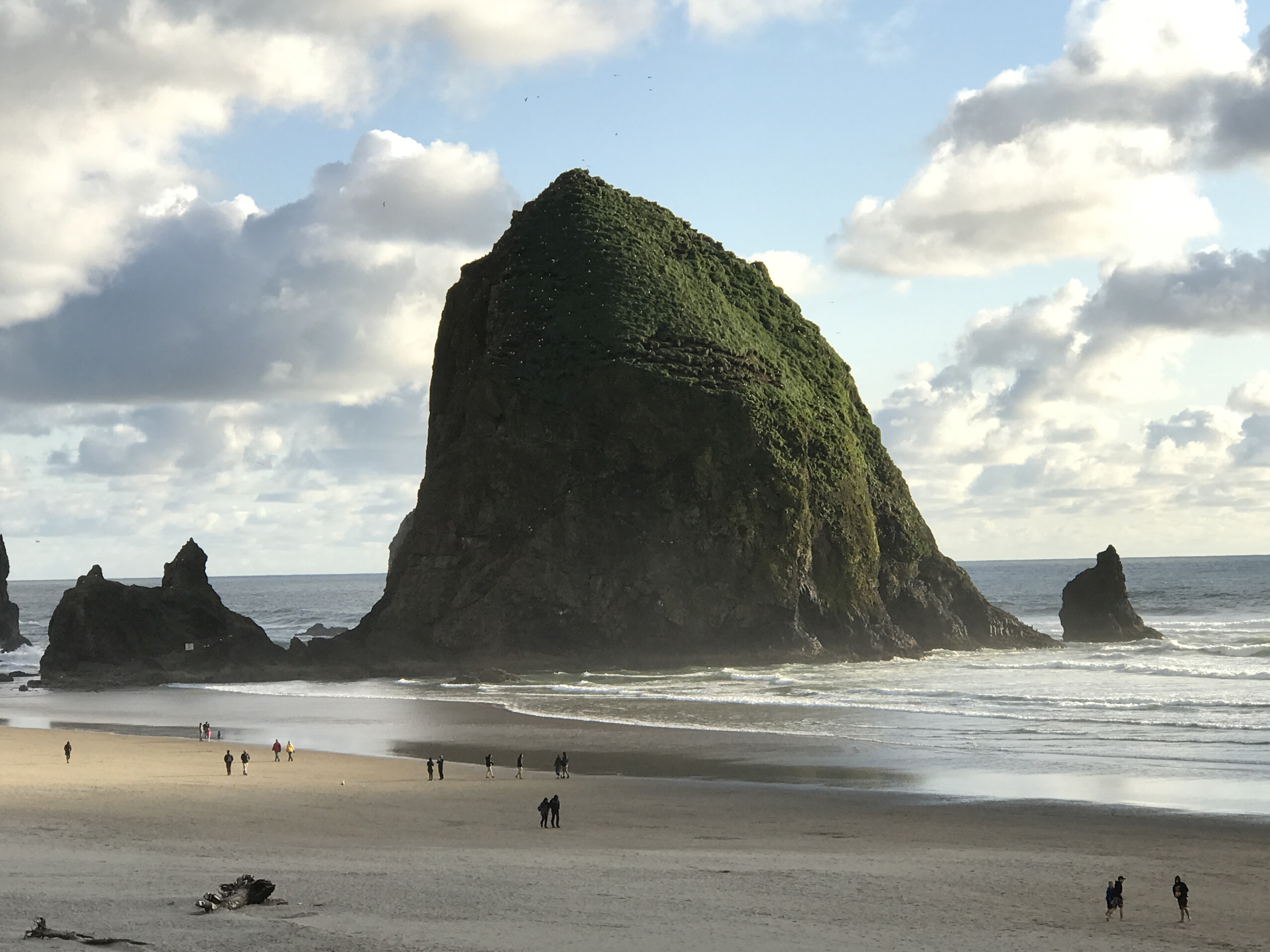
Haystack Rock during low tide

Cannon Beach is recognized by the well-known landmark Haystack Rock, located southwest of downtown Cannon Beach. This sea stack has an elevation of 235 feet (72 m) and is often accessible at low tide, especially in the summertime. There is a small cave system that penetrates its igneous rock that can be seen from the coastline. The rock is also protected as part of Oregon Islands National Wildlife Refuge and events are not allowed within 100 feet (30 m) of either side of the rock. Near Haystack Rock are the Needles, two tall rocks rising straight out of the water.

Four parks can be found within city limits: Haystack Hill State Park, Les Shirley Park, John Yeon State Natural Site (closed to visitors), and Tolovana Beach State Recreation Site.

== Education ==
It is in the Seaside School District 10. The comprehensive high school of that district is Seaside High School.

Clatsop County is in the boundary of Clatsop Community College.

== Media and film ==
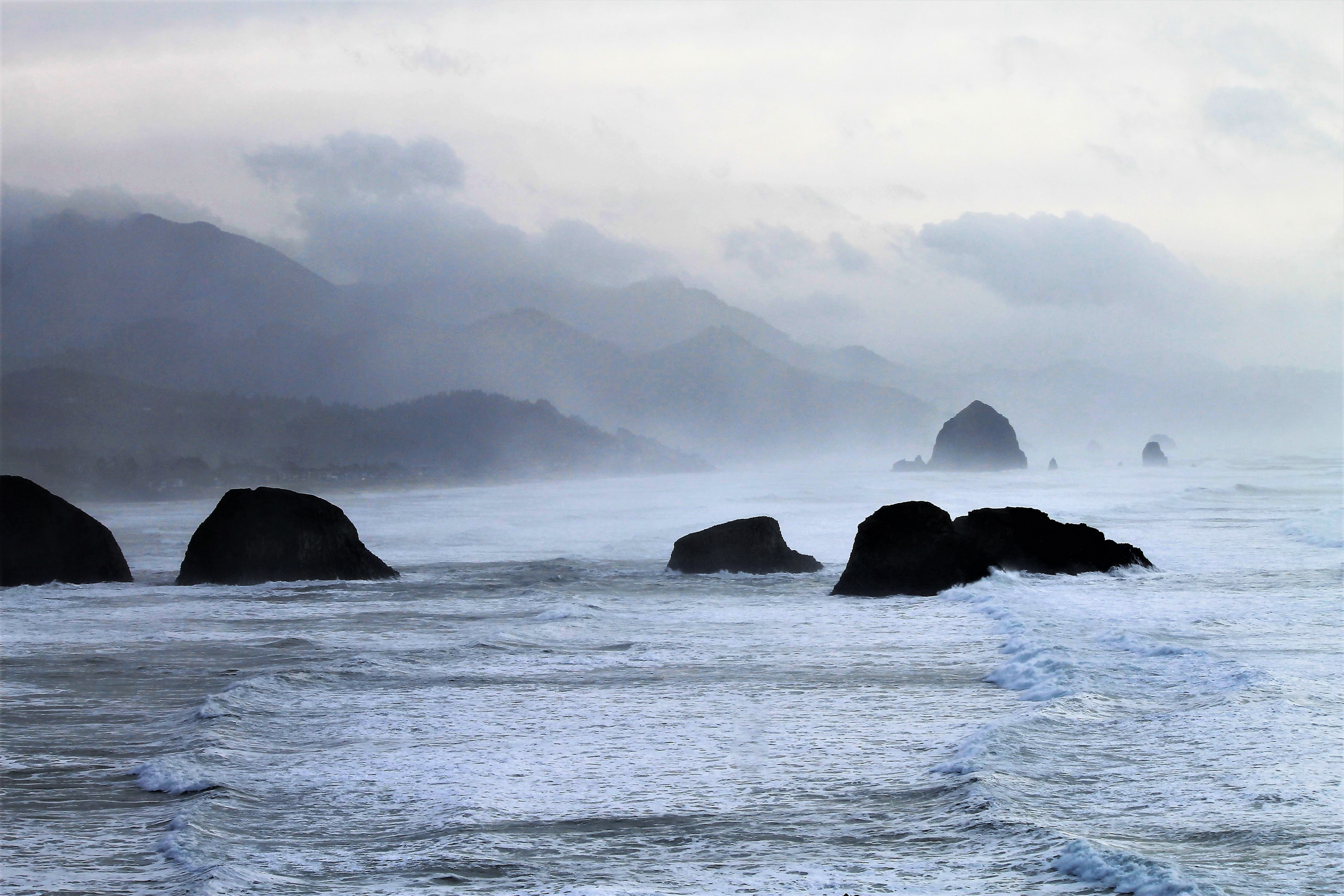
View of Cannon Beach from Ecola State Park that was also featured in The Goonies

The Cannon Beach Gazette, a monthly newspaper that covers area politics, news, sports and community events. The paper is owned and operated by Country Media Inc.

Cannon Beach and Ecola State Park have appeared in several films, including The Goonies (1985), Free Willy (1993), Twilight (2008), Hysterical (1983), and Point Break (1991).

=== Filmography ===
Year	Title	Scene
1985	The Goonies	The Fratellis sneak into a race on the beach to evade the authorities during a police chase in the opening credits. Ecola State Park was also the location for the Lighthouse Lounge.
1990	Kindergarten Cop	Several characters attend a carnival in a scene that was filmed in Ecola State Park.
1991	Point Break	Indian Beach was the stand-in for Bells Beach, Victoria, when Johnny confronts Bodhi, who attempts to go surfing during a storm in the film's time-jumping final act.
2021	Far from the Tree	Although not named, Cannon Beach was the model for the beach in this animated short. Haystack Rock is visible in the background.

== Transportation ==
The main road through Cannon Beach is Hemlock Street, which runs from the north end of the city to the south, through Tolovana Park. Both ends of the street connect to U.S. Highway 101.

Sunset Empire Transportation District operates Route 20 and the Pacific Connector, both of which provide hourly bus service to Cannon Beach, connecting it with other surrounding communities

Tillamook County Transportation District provides hourly service between Cannon Beach and Tillamook

The NorthWest POINT runs between Cannon Beach and Union Station in Portland; tickets can be booked through Amtrak.
