= Ask Max =

1986 television film directed by Vincent McEveety

- Directed by: Vincent McEveety
- Starring: Kareem Abdul-Jabbar; Kreag Caffey; Byron Clark; Ray Walston; Jeff Cohen; Cassie Yates
- Music by: Robert Folk
- Country of origin: United States
- Original language: English

Production
- Running time: 60 minutes
- Production company: Walt Disney Television

Original release
- Release: November 2, 1986

Ask Max is a 1986 American television film starring Jeff Cohen as Max Baxter, a kid inventor. Max designs a bike that he sells to a toy company. It aired as a part of The Wonderful World of Disney.

== Cast ==
- Kareem Abdul-Jabbar as Himself
- Kreag Caffey as The Coach
- Byron Clark as Marcus
- Christie Clark as Shelly Meyers
- Jeff Cohen as Max Baxter
- April Dawn as Student #1
- Gino De Mauro as Dennis
- Andy Dunbar as Basketball Player
- Deena Freeman as Pam
- Scott Freeman as Bike Rider
- Corki Grazer as Rider #1
- Ryan Lambert as Bully #1
- Bret Granville as Bully #2
- Walter Raymond as History Teacher
- Kat Sawyer-Young as Miss Phillips
- Patrick Stehr as Student #2
- Mark L. Taylor as Braff
- Glynn Turman as Lloyd Lyman
- Tami Turner as Adrian
- Ray Walston as John Harmon
- Cassie Yates as Jennifer Baxter
