= Cannon Beach Sandcastle Contest =

Annual event in Cannon Beach, Oregon, U.S.

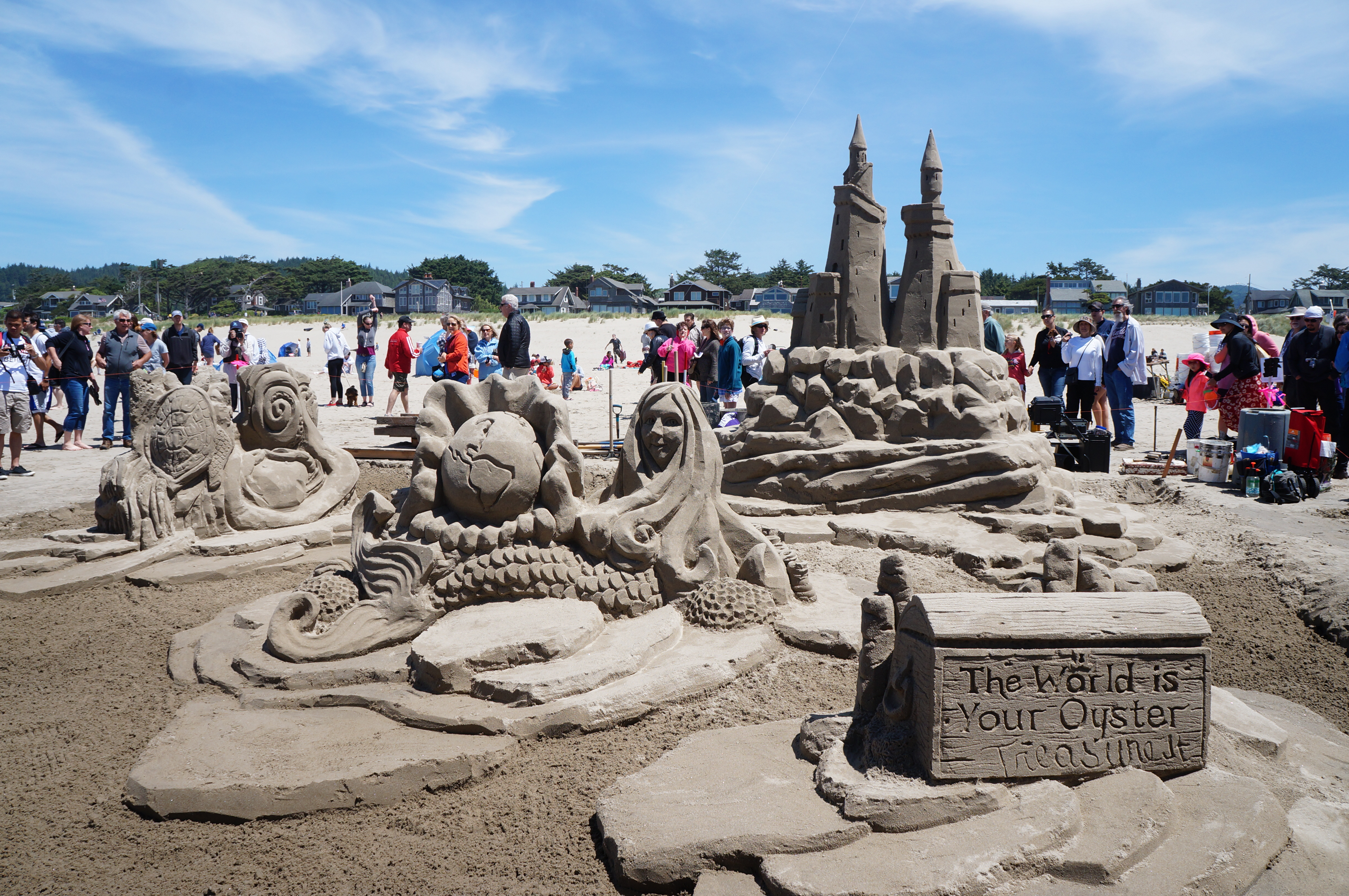
- Sandcastles in 2015
- Status: Active
- Begins: 1964
- Frequency: Annually
- Locations: Cannon Beach, Oregon, U.S.
- Country: United States

The Cannon Beach Sandcastle Contest is an annual event in Cannon Beach, Oregon, United States. Thousands of people attended the event each June. It is the nation's oldest sandcastle contest, with a tradition dating back to 1964.

Only natural materials can be used. The contest has cash prizes. Sandcastles are judged for "a variety of details such as enthusiasm, design, final appearance and event regulations", according to the Statesman Journal.

The contest was virtual in 2020 and 2021 because of the COVID-19 pandemic.

== See also ==
- U.S. Open Sandcastle competition
