= Far from the Tree (film) =

2021 animated short film

- Official poster
- Directed by: Natalie Nourigat
- Written by: Natalie Nourigat
- Produced by: Ruth Strother
- Cinematography: Joaquin Baldwin; Roger Lee
- Edited by: Jeff Draheim; Fabienne Rawley
- Music by: Nami Melumad
- Production company: Walt Disney Animation Studios
- Distributed by: Walt Disney Studios Motion Pictures (Note: Distributed by Walt Disney Studios Motion Pictures through the Walt Disney Pictures banner.)
- Release dates: June 15, 2021 (Annecy Film Festival); November 24, 2021 (with Encanto)
- Running time: 7 minutes
- Country: United States
- Language: English

Far from the Tree is a 2021 American animated drama short film written and directed by Natalie Nourigat and produced by Ruth Strother. The film follows a young curious raccoon whose father often scolds her for inadvertently putting herself in danger. When she becomes an adult, she finds herself and her son in similar circumstances to her parent and herself.

The film was conceived in 2018, when Disney requested pitches for theatrical short films; the company eventually approved an unfinished pitch by Nourigat. Initially written as humans, the raccoon main characters proved a challenge for the animators, owing to a struggle to find the balance between anthropomorphism and realism. Far from the Tree premiered at the Annecy International Animation Film Festival on June 15, 2021, and was later released on November 24 of the same year alongside theatrical screenings of Encanto. Critical reviews of Far from the Tree were positive, with praise for its themes and emotion.

== Plot ==
On a beach, a young raccoon named Marie ventures out from the forest with her father, who has a scar over his right eye. Her father orders her to stay in a grotto while he digs for oysters. Marie repeatedly exits the grotto to help dig or investigate the surrounding wildlife, which prompts her father to angrily drag her back.

On one of her outings, Marie discovers a seashell and holds it to her ear, enjoying the sound of ocean waves audible within. However, her father angrily chases her back into the grotto and smashes the seashell to pieces. One of the pieces is stolen by a seagull, which Marie chases after. The chase leads Marie to a coyote, which attacks her, leaving a gash on her nose. Her father manages to knock the coyote aside and carry Marie back into a tree, where he angrily scolds her as she sobs.

Years later, an adult Marie, whose scar from the coyote encounter is still visible, ventures out to the beach with her own son. She orders her son to stay in the grotto despite his desire to help and explore. After he leaves the grotto to chase seagulls, Marie angrily snaps at him, only to realize that her behavior was the same her father's. Instead, she teaches him about the danger posed by coyotes, shows him how to dig for oysters, and supervises him while he explores. As the sun sets and the pair return to the forest, Marie gifts her son a seashell, which he holds to his ear.

== Production ==
=== Development ===
In 2018, Disney requested pitches for theatrical short films. Natalie Nourigat, director of Short Circuit film Exchange Student (2020), pitched three concepts that she had written in her sketchbooks. She also pitched a fourth idea (which did not have a proper story) written because of nostalgia for her childhood in Oregon. Disney ultimately approved her fourth concept. Far from the Tree's development was "really intense", with the production crew pushing to figure out the conflict and plot. Though the film initially depicted humans, those characters were scrapped when the team began delving into themes of parenting, intergenerational trauma, death, and hurt. Nourigat found these concepts morbid, and the film began to assume a "really dark" tone. A member of development suggested featuring animal characters in lieu of humans, which resolved several of the tonal issues. Nourigat noted the abundance of raccoons in their natural habitat while on a research trip to Cannon Beach, Oregon, and immediately considered them as the short's main characters. Nourigat appreciated the shift, stating: "Having animal characters allowed us to go to these much more exaggerated places, much more emotional places ... because the stakes are so high and everybody understands that with animal characters". In early 2019, Ruth Strother was offered the role of producer. She and Nourigat had worked together on Ralph Breaks the Internet, in which they served as a production supervisor and story artist, respectively. Strother eagerly accepted the offer since she had firsthand experience with Nourigat's creativity and work ethic.

=== Animation and design ===
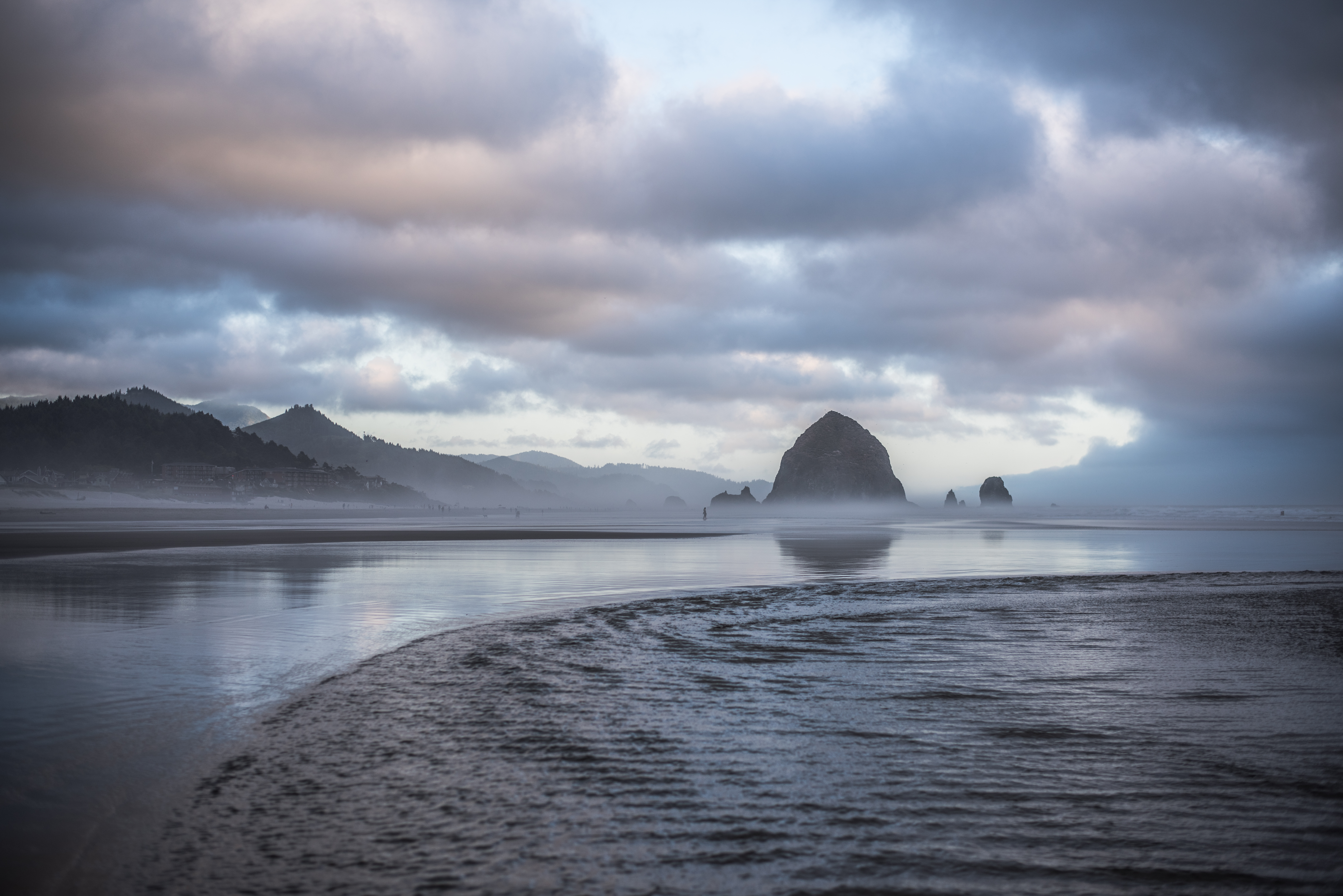
Cannon Beach, on which the film's setting is based

The team took inspiration from real-life raccoons; according to Strother, "they basically are like cartoon characters", meaning there was a way of animating them as appealing while allowing them to behave as they would in their natural environment. The animators found it difficult to establish the correct balance between anthropomorphism and realism. Early storyboards were cartoony and depicted the characters acting similar to humans. They reverted to a more natural way of working. The 2D artists conducted some 2D tests to see how far they could push the limits. The works of Manu Arenas, a comic book artist and production designer, were the inspiration for the watercolor animation style. Cannon Beach's cloudy sky, gray sand, Evergreen trees, and foggy, distant mountains created an unusual color palette for the film's setting.

Nourigat relied substantially on Disney's Meander drawing system, which was used for the short films Paperman and Feast. The system was meant to be a simple accessory, but ended up being used in 96 percent of the short. With Meander, they published a flat color render and incorporated line art as well, much of which was done by hand. Meander allowed the team a large amount of control and artistry by allowing them to redraw where they wanted. To maintain the genuine tone, the artists animated at a slower pace on 3s and 4s. Because the crew enjoyed a glance followed by a powerful stance (which was then held), the animators were encouraged to drop frames.

== Release ==
The film premiered at the Annecy International Animation Film Festival on June 15, 2021. It was released alongside theatrical screenings of Encanto on November 24, and was made available to Disney+ in the following month on December 24, the same day as Encanto. It—as well as "An Introduction to Far from the Tree"—was included on the 4K, Blu-ray, and DVD releases of Encanto on February 8, 2022.

== Reception ==
Upon release, Far from the Tree received positive responses. Reviews of Encanto complimented it as delightful, "endearing and surprisingly emotional", and lovely. Deadline Hollywood called it "a real keeper, worth the price of admission alone", while The Hindu acclaimed its themes of parenting as "the cherry on the top of the jolly confection". A full review of the film from CinemaBlend praised its emotion and storytelling. Parenting magazine Romper stated that it provides deep insight into parent-child relationships and manages to delve into sensitive familial issues. TheWrap listed it as one of the best animated films of 2021, stating it "heralds the emergence of a bold new voice at Disney animation in Natalie Nourigat". Similarly, Collider ranked it Disney's fifth-best short since the 2010s began, considering it to have some of the boldest themes in a Disney short in many years. At the 5th Hollywood Critics Association Film Awards, the film received a nomination for Best Short Film.
