= Jeff Cohen (actor) =

American attorney and retired child actor (born 1974)

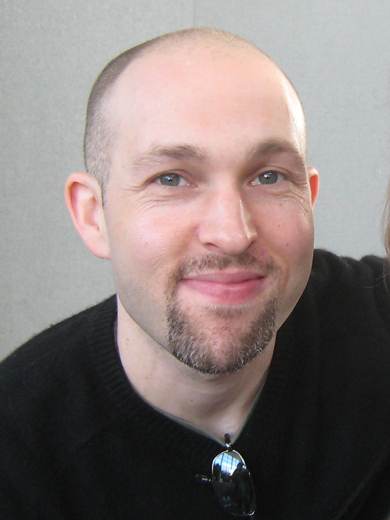
- Cohen in 2008.
- Born: Jeffrey Bertan McMahon; June 25, 1974 (age 52); Los Angeles, California, U.S.
- Education: University of California, Berkeley (BS); University of California, Los Angeles (JD)
- Occupation: Attorney
- Years active: 1983–1991 (actor); 2000–present (attorney)

Jeffrey Bertan Cohen (né McMahon; June 25, 1974) is an American attorney and retired child actor best remembered for appearing as Chunk in the 1985 Steven Spielberg production The Goonies. He is a founding partner of law firm Cohen & Gardner.

== Early life, family and education ==
Cohen was born Jeffrey Bertan McMahon on June 25, 1974, in Los Angeles, California. His father separated from his mother when he was around seven or eight. McMahon took his stage name from the maiden name of his mother, Elaine Cohen. Cohen is Jewish.

Cohen attended the University of California, Berkeley, where he received a Bachelor of Science degree in business. Cohen asked Goonies director Richard Donner for a recommendation for his college admissions application. Upon reading Cohen's notes detailing some of his early life struggles, Donner and his wife offered to pay for Cohen's college education. Cohen later earned a Juris Doctor from the UCLA School of Law.

== Entertainment career ==
=== Acting ===
Cohen was one of the children describing words to the contestants on the 1982–83 CBS game show Child's Play. During the summer of 1985, he appeared as a celebrity on Body Language. In 1986, Cohen was also in the Disney TV movie Ask Max. Cohen's sister, Eydie Faye, is a playwright and actress. In the final scene of The Goonies, when the families reunite on the beach, Faye has a cameo as Chunk's sister.

Cohen claimed in The Goonies DVD commentary track that every role he played as a child had him wearing either a Hawaiian shirt or a pair of plaid pants, and director Richard Donner had the idea to put him in both for The Goonies. Before The Goonies started filming, Cohen contracted chickenpox. Afraid that they would re-cast the role, he told no one of his illness and showed up to work anyway. According to the commentary track on The Goonies DVD, the chickenpox on Cohen's chest can be seen during the "Truffle Shuffle" sequence.

His acting had an incredible sense of genuineness, of reality. He was Jeff—he drew from himself, and I think that's who he is now. He's honest and straight. I think that was in his acting and now in his law practice.

— Director Richard Donner, Variety

=== Law ===
Cohen used introductions from Goonies director Richard Donner to get summer jobs on the business side of movie studios; he would say about that time in the ABA Journal story, "I grew up loving The Three Stooges and the Marx Brothers, but suddenly I had a new crop of heroes." Cohen chose to pursue a legal career upon finding out that many of the most important figures on the business side of Hollywood had law degrees.

After his time at Berkeley, Cohen earned a J.D. degree from the UCLA School of Law in 2000 and later became an entertainment lawyer in Los Angeles. In 2002, he co-founded the Cohen & Gardner firm in Beverly Hills. In the September 24, 2008 issue of Variety, Cohen was profiled in the Dealmakers Impact Report.

Cohen was named to The Hollywood Reporter's "Next Generation: Hollywood's Top 35 Executives 35 and Under" in their November 5, 2008 issue. He was named to Variety's Dealmakers Impact Report in 2013.

As of February 2014, Cohen periodically "writes about business, legal and political matters for The Huffington Post and CNBC."

Cohen negotiated the deal of his Goonies co-star Ke Huy Quan for his casting in Everything Everywhere All at Once (2022). Cohen was in attendance at the 95th Academy Awards where Quan won the Academy Award for Best Supporting Actor; Quan publicly thanked Cohen during his acceptance speech, calling him his "Goonies brother for life."

=== Writing ===
In 2015, he authored the book, “The Dealmaker's Ten Commandments” published by the American Bar Association.

== Filmography ==
Film work by Jeff Cohen
Year	Title	Role	Notes
1983	Little Shots	Ralph	TV movie
1985	The Goonies	Lawrence "Chunk" Cohen	
1986	Ask Max	Max Baxter	TV movie
1988	Scooby-Doo and the Ghoul School	Grunt	Voice
1991	Perfect Harmony	Ward	TV movie

Television work by Jeff Cohen
Year	Title	Role	Notes
1983	Tales from the Darkside	Timmy Muldoon	Episode: "Trick or Treat" (pilot)
1983	Webster	Dwight	Episode: "A Question of Honor"
1984	Kids Incorporated	Webster Bendetti	Episode: "The Prankster"
1984	The Facts of Life	Seymour Slavick	Episode: "The Summer of '84"
1984	Family Ties	Dougie Barker	Episode: "4 Rms Ocn Vu"
1987	Family Ties	Marv Jr.	Episode: "The Visit"
1985	Amazing Stories	Ralph	Episode: "Remote Control Man"
1986	Amazing Stories	Eddie	Episode: "Magic Saturday"
1986	Wonderful World of Disney	Max Baxter	Episode: "Ask Max"
1987	She's the Sheriff	Percy	Episode: "Child's Play"
