= Tolovana Beach State Recreation Site =

State park in Oregon, United States

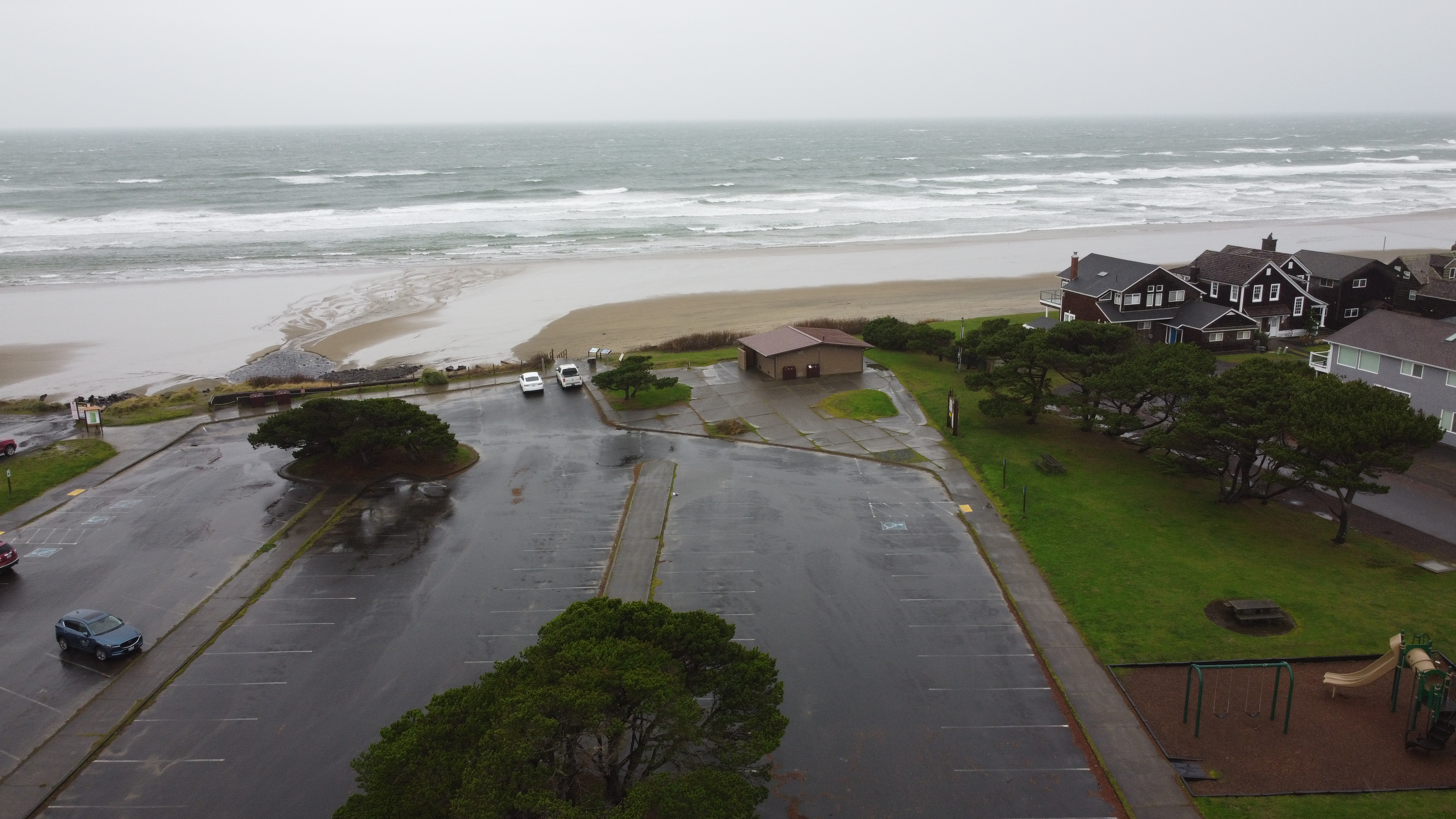
- Tolovana Beach State Recreation Site

- Location within Oregon Location within the United States
- Type: Public, state
- Location: Clatsop County, Oregon
- Nearest city: Cannon Beach
- Coordinates: 45°52′24″N 123°57′44″W
- Operator: Oregon Parks and Recreation Department

Tolovana Beach State Recreation Site is a state park in the U.S. state of Oregon, administered by the Oregon Parks and Recreation Department.

== See also ==
- List of Oregon state parks
