= Subsistence pattern =

Strategy by which a society survives

A subsistence pattern – alternatively known as a subsistence strategy – is the means by which a society satisfies its basic needs for survival. This encompasses the attainment of nutrition, water, and shelter. The five broad categories of subsistence patterns are foraging, horticulture, pastoralism, agriculture, and industrial food production.

== Foraging ==
Foraging is the oldest subsistence pattern, with all human societies relying on it until approximately 10,000 years ago. Foraging societies obtain the majority of their resources directly from the environment without cultivation. Also known as Hunter-gatherers, foragers may subsist through collecting wild plants, hunting, or fishing. Hunter-gatherer communities are frequently small and mobile, with egalitarian social structures. Contrary to the common perception of hunter-gatherer life as precarious and nutrient-deficient, Canadian anthropologist Richard Borshay Lee found that "with few conspicuous exceptions, the hunter-gatherer subsistence base is at least routine and reliable and at best surprisingly abundant."

== Horticulture ==
Horticultural societies typically engage in small-scale gardening with simple tools. These methods allow for higher population densities but still depend on the availability of plentiful, undeveloped land. A common type of horticulture is slash-and-burn cultivation, wherein regions of wild foliage are cut and burned, producing nutrient-rich biochar in which to grow crops. Traditional, small-scale slash-and-burn cultivation—such as that practiced by the Guaraní people in South America – can be efficient and sustainable, with the natural environment eventually reclaiming and reintegrating old garden plots.

== Pastoralism ==
Pastoralism involves the herding and breeding of domestic animals. Pastoralism is common in arid geographic regions, or those with fluctuating rainfall. In such places, raising herbivores is often a more reliable lifestyle than farming, and the livestock convert wild vegetation that is indigestible to humans into meat and dairy products. Pastoral communities are generally nomadic to accommodate for the needs of their herds as the seasons and the availability of pasture changes. Pastoralism remains fairly popular today, with 21 million pastoralists in Africa and Asia alone.

== Agriculture ==
Agriculture is the intensive maintenance and cultivation of land for food production. It is distinct from horticulture in its use of more diverse and complex technology to plant, irrigate, plow, fertilize, and harvest from considerably larger tracts of land. Agriculture may also involve raising livestock, with variants ranging from mixed farming to exclusive ranching. Agrarian societies are often larger and more complex than foraging, horticultural, or pastoral ones; the combination of high carrying capacity and stationary farmsteads enables dense populations and the development of cities peopled with nonproducing specialists.

== Industrial food production ==
Industrial food production is a variation of agriculture common among industrial societies. It is characterized by even greater, energy intensive use of modern mechanical, chemical, and biological technologies to maximize production. Only a small fraction of people in industrial societies are farmers; the rest obtain money to buy their food by engaging in the complex business and service economy. A significant part of the energy cost of industrial food production arises from the packaging and shipping of products to the increasingly urban consumer base. The energy costs, pesticide use, and widespread erosion implicit in many forms of industrial food production have led to concerns about its long-term sustainability as a pattern of subsistence.
