= The Goonies (MSX video game) =

1985 video game

- Developer: Konami
- Publisher: Konami
- Platform: MSX
- Release: 1985
- Genre: Platform
- Mode: Single-player

The Goonies (Note: Japanese: グーニーズ, Hepburn: Gūnīzu) is a 1985 platform game by Konami for the MSX based on the film of the same name. The music is a simple rendition of the song "The Goonies 'R' Good Enough", by Cyndi Lauper.

== Development ==
The Goonies was released in 1985. The game is based on the Famicom version with different levels. The game was released throughout Brazil in 1986 under the title O Tesouro Perdido by Sharp-Epcom.

In 2006, an independent dev team named Bran Games remade the game for Windows as freeware. The remake has improved graphics, visual and sound effects.

== Gameplay ==
The Goonies is a platform and puzzle game, featuring five 'scenes'. After each successfully completed scene, a key word is given and thus the player can continue the game from this point at any time.
