= The Goonies =

1985 film by Richard Donner

- Theatrical release poster by Drew Struzan
- Directed by: Richard Donner
- Screenplay by: Chris Columbus
- Story by: Steven Spielberg
- Produced by: Richard Donner; Harvey Bernhard
- Starring: Sean Astin; Josh Brolin; Jeff Cohen; Corey Feldman; Kerri Green; Martha Plimpton; Ke Huy Quan
- Cinematography: Nick McLean
- Edited by: Michael Kahn; Steven Spielberg (Note: uncredited)
- Music by: Dave Grusin
- Production company: Amblin Entertainment
- Distributed by: Warner Bros.
- Release date: June 7, 1985 (United States)
- Running time: 114 minutes
- Country: United States
- Language: English
- Budget: $19 million
- Box office: $65 million

The Goonies is a 1985 American adventure comedy film directed by Richard Donner from a screenplay by Chris Columbus based on a story by Steven Spielberg. The film stars Sean Astin, Josh Brolin, Jeff Cohen, Corey Feldman, Kerri Green, Martha Plimpton and Ke Huy Quan with John Matuszak, Robert Davi, Joe Pantoliano and Anne Ramsey in supporting roles. In the film, a group of children who live in the "Goon Docks" neighborhood of Astoria, Oregon attempt to save their homes from foreclosure. In doing so, they discover an old treasure map which takes them on an adventure to unearth the long-lost fortune of One-Eyed Willy, a legendary 17th-century pirate, while being pursued by a family of criminals who are after the treasure as well.

The film was produced by Spielberg's Amblin Entertainment and released by Warner Bros. theatrically on June 7, 1985, in the United States. The film grossed $65 million worldwide on a budget of $19 million. It received generally positive reviews from critics and has since become a cult film. In 2017, the film was selected for preservation in the United States National Film Registry by the Library of Congress as being "culturally, historically, or aesthetically significant".

On February 14, 2025, a sequel was confirmed to be in the works with Potsy Ponciroli writing the script along with Steven Spielberg and Chris Columbus producing.

== Plot ==
Facing foreclosure of their homes in the "Goon Docks" neighborhood of Astoria, Oregon to an expanding country club, a group of boys who call themselves "the Goonies"—Michael "Mikey" Walsh, Richard "Data" Wang, Clark "Mouth" Devereaux, and Lawrence "Chunk" Cohen—gather for a final weekend together. While rummaging through the Walshes' attic, they come across a 1632 doubloon and an old treasure map purporting to lead to the treasure of legendary pirate "One-Eyed Willy", believed to be located somewhere nearby.

Seeing the treasure as their last chance to save their homes, the boys overpower and bind Mikey's older brother, Brandon "Brand", to get past him and make their way to an abandoned restaurant on the coast that coincides with the map. Brand soon follows alongside Andrea "Andy" Carmichael, a high school cheerleader with a crush on him, and her tomboy best friend, Stephanie "Stef" Steinbrenner. The group soon discovers that the derelict restaurant is a hideout of the Fratelli crime family consisting of Francis, Jake and their mother. The Goonies find a tunnel in the basement and follow it, but Chunk leaves to alert the police after being mistakenly locked in a freezer.

Chunk flags down a nearby car to go to the sheriff's station, but it turns out to be the Fratellis, who abduct him. They interrogate him until he reveals where the Goonies have gone and begin pursuit. Chunk is left behind alongside their hulking and deformed younger brother "Sloth", whom he befriends. After Sloth frees them both, Chunk calls the sheriff, who thinks it is another one of his tall tales. Chunk and Sloth follow the trail of the Fratellis.

The Goonies evade several deadly booby traps along the tunnels and obtain candles from the skeletal remains of a previous treasure hunter Chester Copperpot, while barely staying ahead of the Fratellis. They finally reach the grotto where Willy's pirate ship, the Inferno, is anchored. The group finds the ship filled with treasure and they start filling their pockets, but Mikey warns them not to take any on a set of scales in front of Willy's skeleton, considering that to be their tribute to him.

As the Goonies are plotting their escape, the Fratellis appear and strip them of their haul. They then start to bind the Goonies' hands and make them walk the plank until Chunk and Sloth arrive and distract the Fratellis long enough for the Goonies to jump overboard and swim to safety. The Fratellis proceed to grab all the treasure they can, including those on Willy's scales, which triggers one last booby trap, forcing them to drop the treasure. The Goonies attempt to use a last "candle" only to find it is a stick of dynamite, causing the grotto to cave in. With Sloth's help, the Goonies and Fratellis barely escape.

The groups emerge on Astoria's beach, where the Goonies reunite with their families and the Fratellis are arrested by the police. The Goonies prevent Sloth's arrest and Chunk invites Sloth to live with him, which he accepts. Just as the foreclosure papers are about to be signed, the Walshes' housekeeper, Rosalita, discovers that Mikey's marble bag is filled with some of the ship's jewels that had not been seized by the Fratellis and there is now enough money to negate the foreclosure.

As the Goonies are recounting their adventure to the dumbfounded police and press, everyone's attention is drawn to the Inferno, having broken free of the grotto, sailing off majestically on its own in the distance.

== Cast ==
- Sean Astin as Michael "Mikey" Walsh, the asthmatic leader of the Goonies who is determined to save his neighborhood by finding One-Eyed Willy's treasure
- Josh Brolin as Brandon "Brand" Walsh, a high-school athlete and Mikey's older brother
- Jeff Cohen as Lawrence "Chunk" Cohen, a clumsy and gluttonous member of the Goonies and habitual fabulist
- Corey Feldman as Clark "Mouth" Devereaux, a member of the Goonies nicknamed for his cheeky tongue and Mikey's best friend who is fluent in Spanish
- Kerri Green as Andrea Theresa "Andy" Carmichael, a high-school cheerleader and Brand's love interest who is panic-prone
- Martha Plimpton as Stephanie "Stef" Steinbrenner, a snarky tomboy and Andy's best friend
- Ke Huy Quan as Richard "Data" Wang, a member of the Goonies who is a James Bond fanatic and amateur gadgeteer and the Walshes' next-door neighbor
- John Matuszak as Lotney "Sloth" Fratelli, the Fratellis' deformed and much-abused, but muscular and child-hearted middle son whom Chunk befriends
- Robert Davi as Jake Fratelli, a counterfeiter and the Fratellis' eldest son who recently escaped from jail
- Joe Pantoliano as Francis Fratelli, the Fratellis' youngest and favored son
- Anne Ramsey as Mama Fratelli, the Fratellis' matriarch
- Mary Ellen Trainor as Irene Walsh, Mikey and Brand's mother
- Keith Walker as Irving Walsh, Mikey and Brand's father and an assistant curator at the local history museum
- Lupe Ontiveros as Rosalita, the Walsh family's housekeeper who can only speak Spanish
- Curt Hanson as Elgin Perkins, Troy's millionaire father and proprietor of Astoria Country Club who is behind the foreclosures at the "Goon Docks"
- Steve Antin as Troy Perkins, the spoiled son of Elgin Perkins who is Brand's rival for Andy's affection
- Paul Tuerpe as the local sheriff
- George Robotham as a prison guard who gets fooled by Jake's feigned suicide
- Michael Paul Chan as Data's approving father

Director Richard Donner makes an uncredited cameo appearance as the sheriff's deputy. The film's cinematographer Nick McLean additionally has a cameo as Mouth's father and the part of the murdered FBI agent was performed by stuntman Ted Grossman.

== Production ==
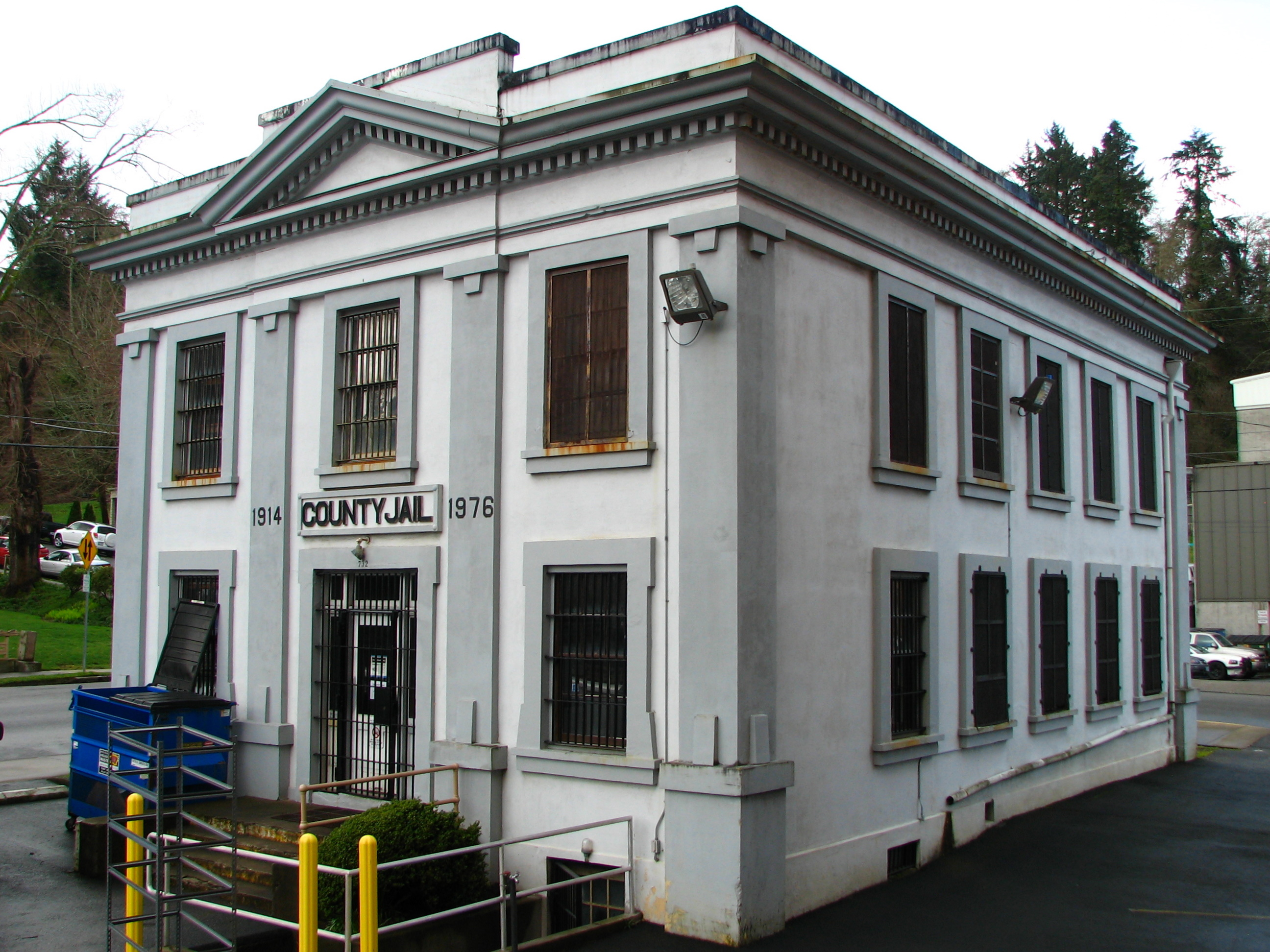
The old Clatsop County Jail in Astoria, Oregon where the scene of the Fratelli jailbreak took place; the site is now home to the Oregon Film Museum

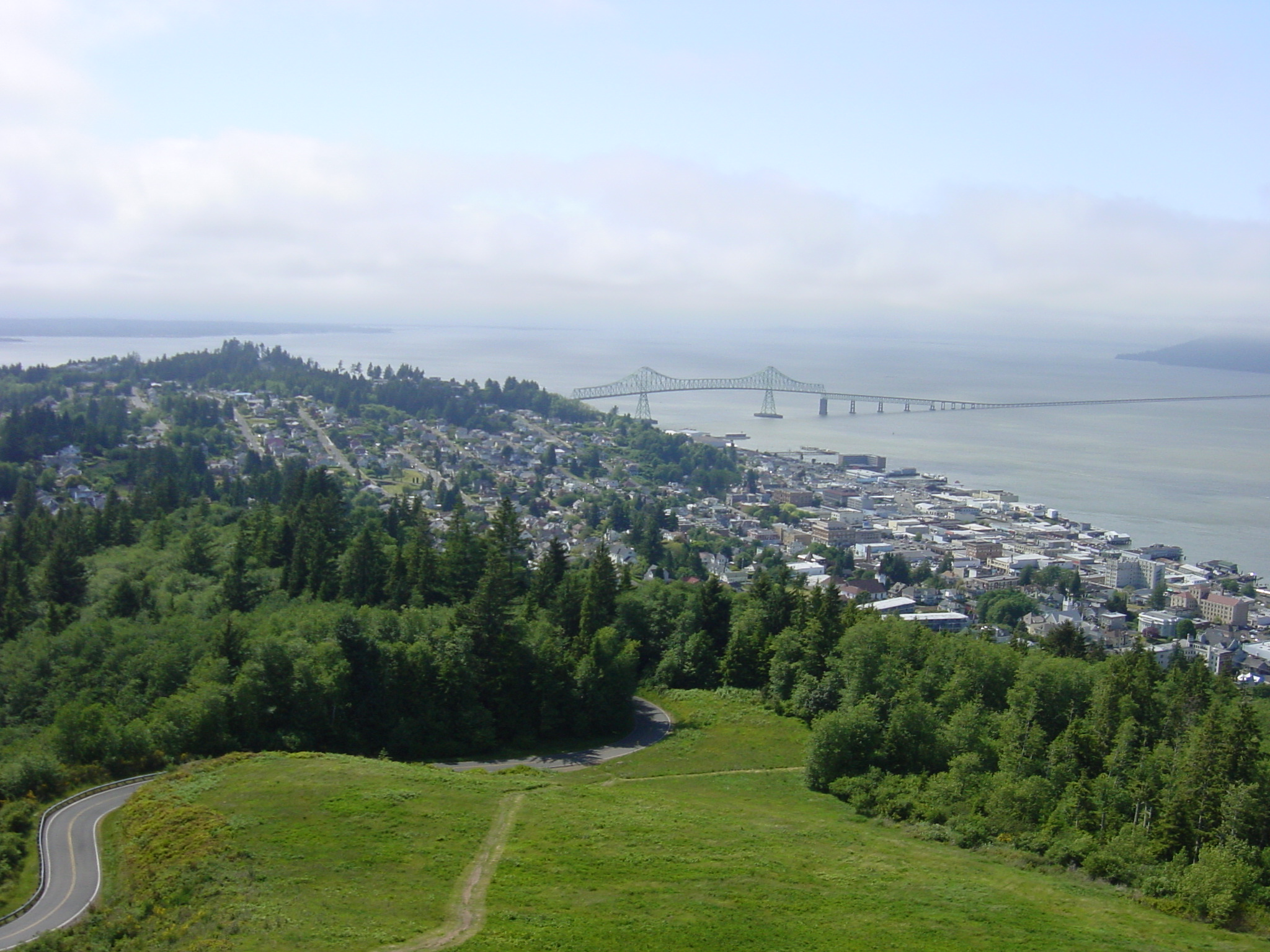
Much of the filming was done on location in Astoria, Oregon, the setting of the film.

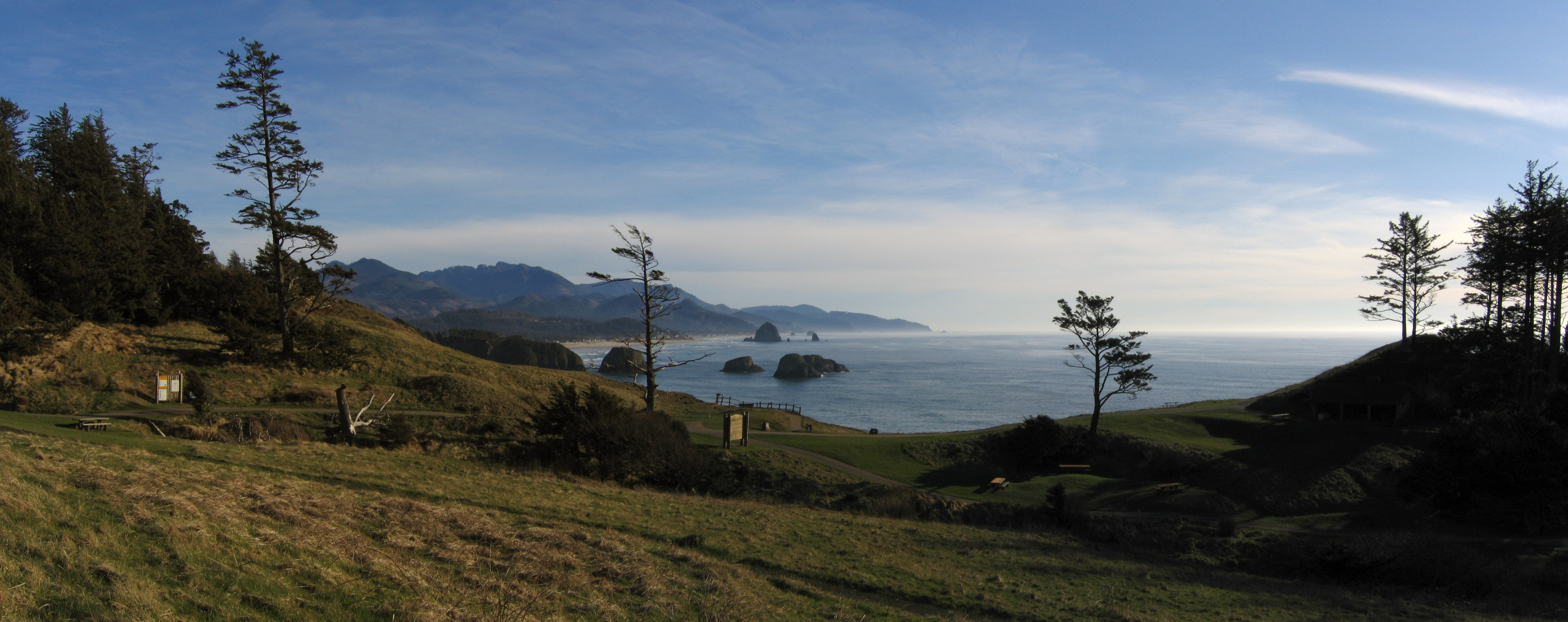
Part of the filming was done in Ecola State Park in Cannon Beach, Oregon.

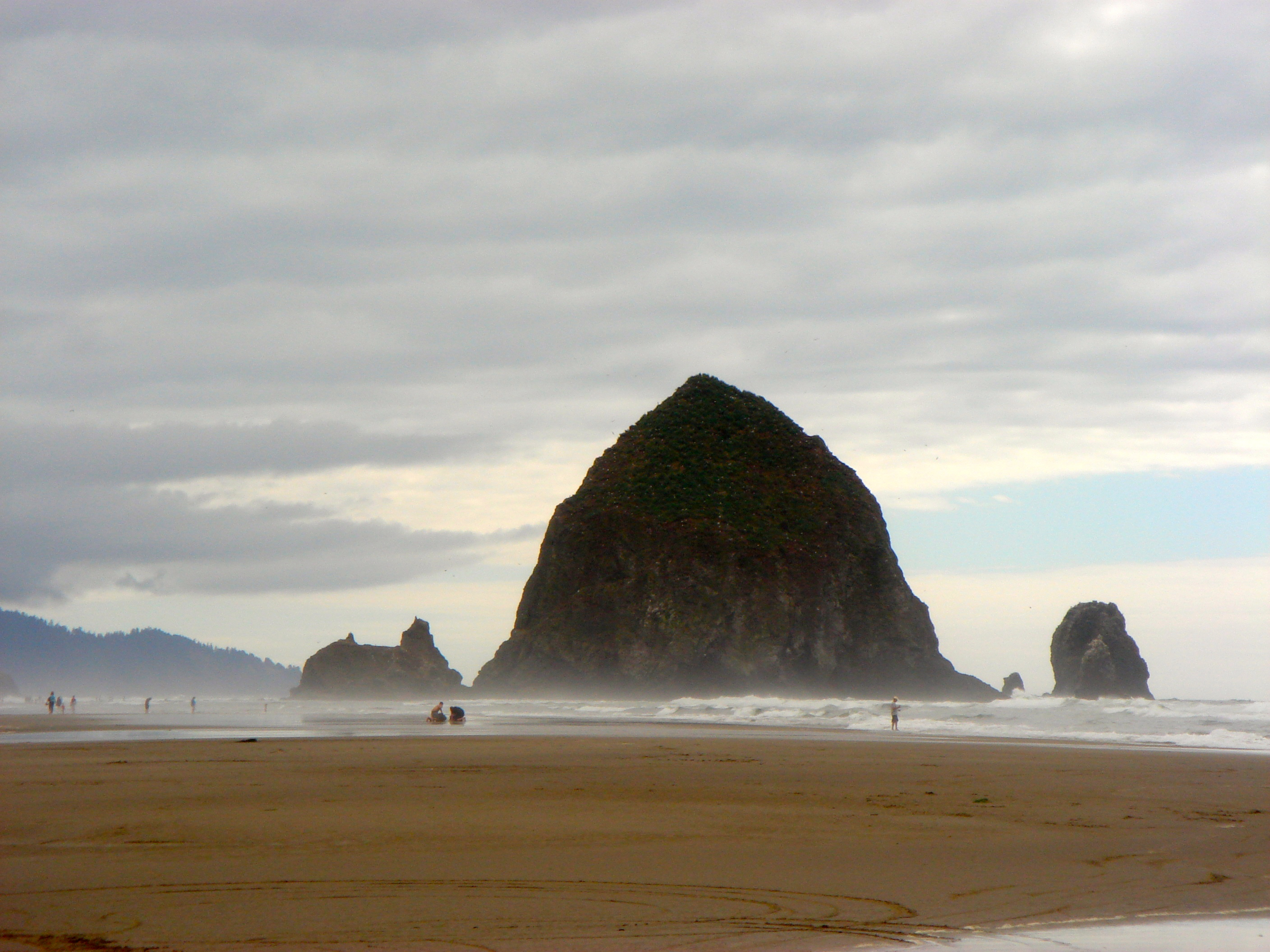
The ORV racing scene of the film was filmed in Cannon Beach featuring Haystack Rock.

Principal photography on The Goonies began on October 22, 1984, and lasted five months. An additional six weeks of audio dubbing and recording were used. The shooting script was lengthy, at more than 120 pages, to which several sequences were eventually cut from the final theatrical version. During the film's dénouement, mention is made of an octopus, which refers to a scene that was excised from the final cut.

In the documentary The Making of The Goonies, Richard Donner noted both the difficulties and pleasures of working with so many child actors. He praised them for their energy and excitement, but said that they were also unruly when brought together. As a result, the documentary frequently showed him coaching the actors and revealing some techniques he used to create realistic performances. One of these tricks involved One-Eyed Willy's pirate ship, which was actually a full-sized replica of a pirate ship created under the direction of production designer J. Michael Riva. Donner restricted the actors from seeing the ship until they filmed the scene wherein it is revealed to their characters; the characters' first glimpse of the ship was also the actors' first view of it, bringing about a more realistic performance. However, that particular scene in the final cut was actually the second take, due to the cast feeling so overwhelmed at first sight that the scene had to be reshot. The entire set was scrapped after shooting because they could not find anyone who wanted it. Donner said that the Truffle Shuffle scene was "painful" to film as Cohen was getting mocked for weight and the humor was from pain.

In his book There and Back Again, Sean Astin claimed that Donner and Spielberg were "like co-directors" on the film as he compared and contrasted their styles when directing scenes.

Some of the on-location filming was done in Astoria. The interior and exterior of the old Clatsop County Jail features as the holding place of Jake Fratelli at the start of the film. (The building was later converted into the Oregon Film Museum, which opened on the 25th anniversary of The Goonies with memorabilia from this and other local films.) The museum where Mikey's father works is, in reality, the Captain George Flavel House Museum. The Walsh family home is a real home on the eastern end of the town, at 368 38th Street. The road leading to the home was closed to tours in 2015. The scenes along the coast were filmed in Oregon, but they were a considerable distance from Astoria. The Goonies bicycle to Ecola State Park (in reality, in Cannon Beach, over 26 miles (42 km) south of Astoria) and then find the starting location of the map using Haystack Rock as a guide. Underground scenes were filmed at Warner Bros. Studios in Burbank, California, including the cavernous set where the Goonies find One-Eyed Willy's ship, which was in Stage 16, one of the largest sound stages in the United States. The final scene was shot at Goat Rock State Beach in Sonoma County, California.

The film also marked Wes Takahashi's first major motion picture as an animation supervisor for Industrial Light & Magic.

== Music and soundtrack ==
The Goonies: Original Motion Picture Soundtrack features music by Cyndi Lauper, REO Speedwagon, The Bangles, and others. The cast members (except Kerri Green) appeared alongside professional wrestlers Andre The Giant, "Rowdy" Roddy Piper, The Iron Sheik, Nikolai Volkoff, The Fabulous Moolah, and "Captain" Lou Albano (who previously appeared in Lauper's "Girls Just Wanna Have Fun" video) in the 12-minute "The Goonies 'R' Good Enough" music video. Steven Spielberg makes a cameo appearance. Lauper also has a cameo in the film, performing the song on TV, although the song was not completed until after filming.

Dave Grusin's score was unavailable for 25 years. The main theme, "Fratelli Chase", has been used in numerous trailers, such as Innerspace, Scrooged, and Guarding Tess, and was re-recorded by Grusin and the London Symphony Orchestra for the album Cinemagic. The score makes liberal use of the Max Steiner-composed theme from Adventures of Don Juan. Soundtrack label Varèse Sarabande released the score on CD in March 2010 in a limited edition of 5,000 copies. The company reissued the score on CD as a wide release in June 2019, but with the previous CD's four bonus tracks omitted.

== Release ==
=== Box office ===
Warner Bros. released the movie in 1,705 theaters.

=== Home media ===
The Goonies was first released on VHS and Betamax video in the United States in March 1986 and the LaserDisc and CED versions also debuted that year. Warner Home Video released a theatrical widescreen laserdisc on January 29, 1992. Warner Home Video released The Goonies in widescreen on Region 1 DVD on August 21, 2001. Warner Home Video released The Goonies on Blu-ray Disc in October 2008 in Europe and November 2010 in North America. The video is in 1080p high-definition VC-1 and accompanied by a Dolby TrueHD soundtrack. Warner released the film on Ultra HD Blu-ray in September 2020 in North America.

== Reception ==
=== Critical response ===
The Goonies received positive reviews upon release. Review aggregator Rotten Tomatoes reports that 77% of critics have given the film a positive review based on 65 reviews, with an average rating of 6.7/10. The critical consensus: "The Goonies is an energetic, sometimes noisy mix of Spielbergian sentiment and fun-house tricks that will appeal to kids and nostalgic adults alike." At Metacritic it has a rating score of 62 based on 13 reviews, indicating "generally favorable reviews".

Roger Ebert gave the film three stars out of four and called the film "a smooth mixture of the usual ingredients from Steven Spielberg action movies, made special because of the high-energy performances of the kids who have the adventures." Gene Siskel of the Chicago Tribune also awarded three stars out of four and wrote that after a dull start "some kind of minor movie miracle takes place, and The Goonies gets its act together as the kids stop trading wisecracks and get closer to finding their long-lost pirate treasure, thereby to help save their parents' homes. Only then do we accept The Goonies for what it is—a funny juvenile windup toy about kids in perilous, comic-book situations." Janet Maslin of The New York Times wrote that the film "has a kind of breakneck pacing that keeps it fast, funny, ingenious, entertaining, and — only a small point while the movie is in progress — almost entirely without staying power." Variety called it "a dangerous Disneyland sort of a film stamped with the Steven Spielberg style of high fun. Like other Spielberg summer extravaganzas, pic is a roller coaster ride best enjoyed as it's speeding along. Once it stops to consider the sacred state of adolescence, it becomes painfully syrupy." Michael Wilmington of the Los Angeles Times wrote that the film "resembles nothing so much as a wildly exaggerated fun-fair ride, one that keeps comically exposing you to dangers, comically pulling you away, then, finally, with a shivering plop, deposits you on dry land, in the bosom of your family." Paul Attanasio of The Washington Post called it "an artfully crafted movie, thrumming with energy and sometimes wit, and utterly uninvolving for anyone over the age of 12." Colin Greenland reviewed The Goonies for White Dwarf and stated, "The Goonies I was unable to enjoy because of a bunch of kids yelling and screaming all the way through. Not the audience, the actors."

=== Box office ===
The Goonies grossed $9 million in its opening weekend in the U.S., second on the charts behind Rambo: First Blood Part II. It grossed $63.9 million in the United States and Canada, placing it among the top-10 highest-grossing films of 1985 and $60.6 million overseas for a worldwide gross of $125 million.

=== Awards ===
Ramsey won a Saturn Award for Best Supporting Actress for her role as "Mama" Fratelli. At the 7th Youth in Film Awards (now known as Young Artist Awards), Astin's portrayal of Mikey won the award for Best Starring Performance By a Young Actor in a Motion Picture. Cohen, Feldman, and Plimpton were also nominated for awards for their performances in The Goonies. The film itself was nominated for best adventure motion picture.

== Legacy ==
Special anniversary events for the film, hosted by the city of Astoria, have drawn about 10,000 to 15,000 visitors. The home used for the Walsh family has become a tourist attraction, receiving between 1,200 and 1,500 visitors a day during the summer of the 30th anniversary. As a result, in August 2015, the residents and owners of the home, their neighbors, and the city of Astoria took steps to limit public access to the home.

=== Video games ===
Datasoft produced a Goonies video game for Commodore 64, Atari 8-bit computers, and Apple II in 1985, which was later ported to the ZX Spectrum and Amstrad CPC by U.S. Gold. This game features eight screens in which a player had to use two members of the Goonies group to solve puzzles and reach an exit to advance to the next stage. The screens were largely inspired by actual sets and puzzles seen in the film. A reference to the aforementioned "octopus scene" is included, as the seventh level.

In 1986, Japanese game developer Konami created two versions of The Goonies for the MSX (The Goonies) in Japan and Europe, and Family Computer (The Goonies) in Japan.

The Goonies II was also released on the Famicom (and its international counterpart, the Nintendo Entertainment System). The Goonies II was released in North America, Europe, and Australia, although the original was one of the NES games released as part of the Nintendo VS. System arcade machine in the 1980s. The Goonies II has little to do with the film. In it, the Fratellis (who are accompanied by Jake and Francis' cousin Pipsqueak) have kidnapped all the Goonies (except Mikey, whom the player guides) and have hidden them in cages across a terrain of caverns, mazes, and abandoned buildings. As Mikey, the player must rescue them all and ultimately free a mermaid named Annie.

Mikey was also a playable character in Konami's 1988 Famicom title Wai Wai World, which included a Goonies-themed level.

In February 2007, Chrysler's Jeep division sponsored The Goonies: Return to Astoria, a Flash-based online game developed by Fuel Industries. The player's goal is to collect map pieces and doubloons, and then race the Fratellis to One-Eyed Willy's treasure.

A Goonies level pack for Lego Dimensions was released on May 9, 2017. The pack includes a constructible pirate ship, a skeleton organ, and a Sloth minifigure who is able to change into the other Goonies and unlocks a bonus level that adapts the plot of the film from the perspective of him and Chunk.

=== Possible sequel ===
We tried really hard, and Steven (Spielberg) said, 'Let's do it.' We had a lot of young writers submit work, but it just didn't seem to call for it.

— Richard Donner

The possibility of a film sequel has been confirmed and denied many times over the years by the original cast and crew. Donner said that he had a story he liked and Spielberg behind him, but in 2004, several of the actors from the original revealed that Warner Bros., the film's owner, had shown no interest in a sequel. Sean Astin told MTV in October 2007 that Goonies 2 "is an absolute certainty ... The writing's on the wall when they're releasing the DVD in such numbers." Donner has expressed doubt that a sequel will ever happen, as many of the actors had not shown interest in returning for one. Corey Feldman stated in his November 25, 2008, blog post, "NO! There is no Goonies 2! I'm sorry but it's just not gonna happen .... Course now that I've said that, they'll do it." However, on the July 2010 release of The Making of a Cult Classic: The Unauthorized Story of The Goonies DVD, Richard Donner states a sequel to The Goonies is a "definite thing" and will involve as much of the old cast as possible. "It will happen," says Donner. "We've been trying for a number of years." On April 5, 2014, Richard Donner revealed a sequel is in the works, and he hopes to bring back the entire cast. In the 2020 reunion event, Spielberg stated "Chris, Dick and I — and Lauren [Shuler Donner] — have had a lot of conversations about [a sequel]...Every couple of years we come up with an idea but then it doesn't hold water." In May 2021, Feldman stated that despite Columbus saying that he is writing a sequel, the chances for a sequel were reported to be "dead" as Donner had chosen to direct Lethal Finale as his final film, while the cast originally refused to return without Donner's involvement.

In January 2025, it was reported by Deadline that Warner Bros. was developing a sequel to The Goonies and were waiting on a treatment from writer Chris Columbus who also was reported to have turned in a script for a third Gremlins movie as well. Nothing official has been confirmed by Warner Bros. about a sequel being planned. In February 2025, some of the cast reunited with Chris Columbus to celebrate Ke Huy Quan's star on the Hollywood Walk of Fame. Some were asked about a sequel happening with Quan saying "It's one of the most asked questions in my life. I would love for it to happen". Feldman replied to the question by saying "All I can say is, get us all together. Everybody is looking good. Sean's looking good. Josh is looking good. We're all looking good still, and we're all alive. Goonies never say die...There's hope."

On February 14, 2025, it was announced that The Goonies 2 was officially in the works. Potsy Ponciroli is set to write the script with Steven Spielberg, Kristie Macosko Krieger and Holly Bario producing for Amblin Entertainment alongside Chris Columbus. Lauren Shuler Donner are executive producers.

=== Adaptations ===
Rumors of adaptations and sequels in other media took off in 2007, including a comic-book miniseries, an animated television series and a musical adaptation of the film. Corey Feldman said he was asked to reprise the role of Mouth in an animated series that would feature the original Goonies characters as adults and focus on the adventures of a new set of children. Apparently, this project was briefly in the works for Cartoon Network before being shelved. Entertainment Weekly reported in March 2007 on a potential musical adaptation of the film. "Steven and I have discussed it, and it's something that I'm fairly passionate about right now," Donner says. Variety reported in October 2008 that Donner had met with Broadway entertainment attorney John Breglio, and is "confident things are moving in the right direction." As of May 2011, the musical was still in the beginning stages, but Donner was hopeful that an "irreverent" script would be completed by October.

On February 12, 2020, Fox ordered a pilot for a drama series from Sarah Watson, creator of The Bold Type, about a woman helping film students create a shot-for-shot remake of The Goonies. Greg Mottola is attached as director, and as executive producer along with Richard Donner and his wife, Lauren Shuler Donner. On May 7, 2021, Fox announced that the pilot would not be moving forward. On December 15, 2021, Disney+ picked up the series for development now titled Our Time.

=== Influenced works ===
The 2024 Star Wars franchise television series Star Wars: Skeleton Crew was inspired by The Goonies with Lucasfilm president Kathleen Kennedy saying, "[Show director] Jon Watts came to me, very much wanting to do a sort of Goonies in Star Wars."

=== Reunions ===
On April 27, 2020, through his YouTube channel, Josh Gad aired a virtual cast reunion via Zoom as the first episode of Gad's "Reunited Apart", a charity fundraising effort during the COVID-19 pandemic, with the Goonies reunion supporting the Center for Disaster Philanthropy. All the living primary cast participated, with the event dedicated to the cast members who have since died. In addition to the cast, director Richard Donner, producer Steven Spielberg, and writer Chris Columbus were also present, and even Cyndi Lauper made an appearance. On December 5, 2020, the cast had another virtual reunion, this time for a live reading of the full movie script that was broadcast on multiple social media outlets. The characters whose original actors had died were played by other actors, including Josh Gad as Sloth, Jean Smart as Mama Fratelli, and Kristen Bell as Irene Walsh. Cary Elwes served as the narrator. The event earned over $130,000 in donations for the charity No Kid Hungry.

On February 3, 2025, some of the cast reunited to celebrate Ke Huy Quan's imprint ceremony at TCL Chinese Theatres. Josh Brolin, Corey Feldman, Jeff Cohen, Kerri Green and writer Chris Columbus were there to celebrate him receiving his star. Sean Astin didn't appear in photos, but was said to have arrived later to the ceremony. Later that day, Feldman, Cohen and Green joined Quan and Astin on the red carpet for their movie premiere of Love Hurts. Martha Plimpton was absent for both events for unknown reasons. Quan discussed reuniting with Astin on their film by saying "The day Sean arrived on set, I dropped everything and ran to give him a big hug. We're brothers for life because of that movie. When we finally shot our first scene together, I was transported back to 1985. All the cameras and everyone around us disappeared — it was just me and him. I was that kid again, remembering that exchange: 'Hey Data, where are you going?' 'I'm setting booty traps.' 'You mean booby traps.' To share the screen with him again after all these years is an amazing gift."

== See also ==
- Cliff Hanger, a 1983 arcade laserdisc video game featured in the film; the game itself is based on Hayao Miyazaki's Lupin III anime film Castle of Cagliostro (1979).
- Finding ʻOhana, a 2021 Netflix film
- Stranger Things, a coming-of-age television series.
