= Economy of Oregon =

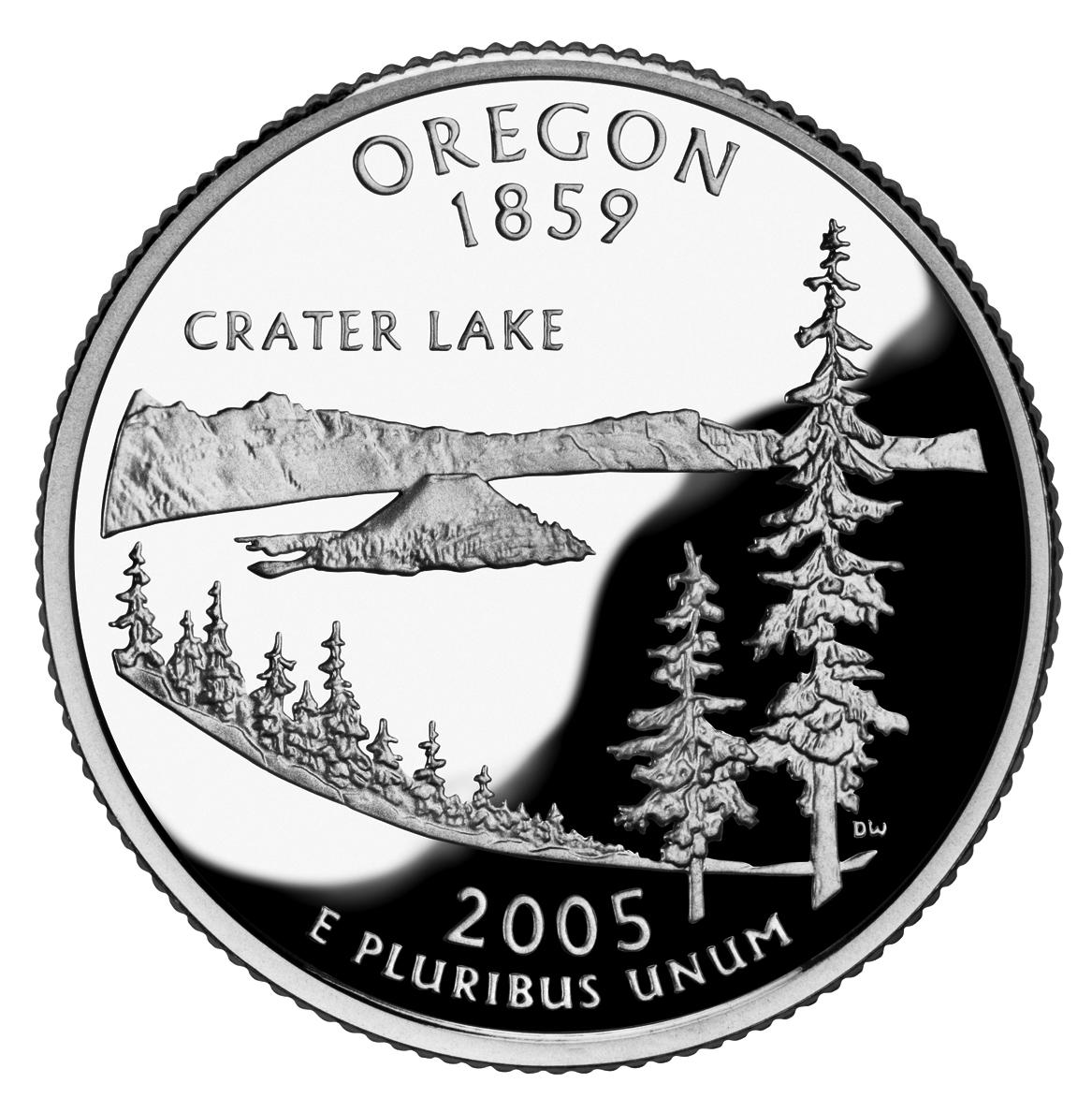
- The Oregon State version of the U.S. Quarter features Crater Lake.

Statistics
- GDP: $331 billion (2024)
- GDP per capita: $70,685 (2024)
- Population below poverty line: 15.5% (2008-2012)
- Gini coefficient: 0.4586
- Labor force: 2,204,277 (May 2025)
- Unemployment: 4.7% (April 2025)

Public finances
- Revenues: $7,475.135 million
- Expenses: $5,889 million

The economy of the U.S. state of Oregon is made up of a number of sectors. During the 1990s and 2000s, Oregon has attempted to transition its economy from one based on natural resources to one based on a mix of manufacturing, services, and high technology.

In the 1980s, hard times hit Oregon's main resource sectors: timber, fishing, and agriculture. Efforts by the state government to diversify the state economy led to the growth of Oregon's high tech sector, based in the three counties surrounding Portland, Oregon, but rural counties were left out. The tech bust of the early 2000s caused Oregon to lose many of the 43,000 jobs lost between 2000 and 2003. Between 2004 and 2007, Oregon's and the nation's economies grew based on increases in construction and services. Construction alone added 21,000 jobs during the period.

According to the Bureau of Economic Analysis, Oregon's gross state product in 2024 was $331 billion, ranking 25th largest in the nation.

The state's per capita personal income in 2021 was $59,484. As of November 2021, the state's unemployment rate is 4.2%. Oregon ranks 37th in the nation for unemployment.

== History ==
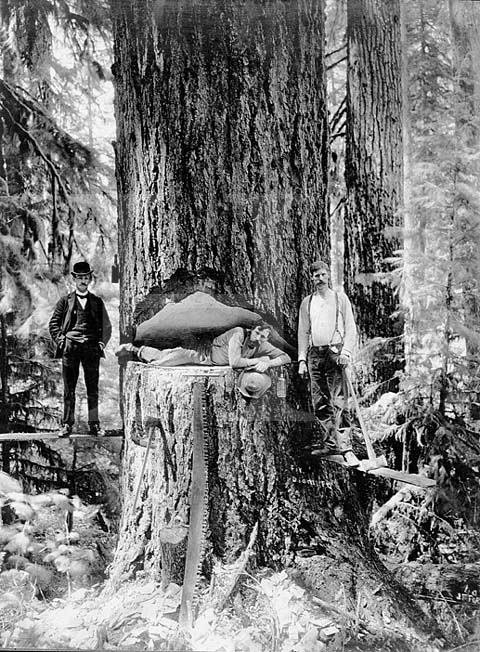
Oregon loggers along the Lower Columbia

The fur trade was Oregon's first major industry. Beginning in the 1840s, settlers began displacing Native Americans and setting up farms. Though growth was slow for the coastal region there was rapid growth in the Willamette Valley and Portland in particular. With the discovery of gold in 1861–62 in Baker county and Grant County in Eastern Oregon had begun establishing itself as a major shipping hub with a focus on wheat. With the railroad's arrival to Oregon, Portland has sealed its position as the economic center of the state. In the following decades, loggers and salmon fishers joined the miners.

With the coming of the First World War, the state's shipyard industry and timber trades continued to expand rapidly again, especially in Portland. In the 1930s, the Works Projects Administration and the Civilian Conservation Corps introduced through the New Deal would construct many projects throughout the state including Timberline Lodge on Mt. Hood and many hydroelectric dams along Oregon's rivers. The Bonneville Dam, built from 1933 to 1937 provided low cost electricity that helped fuel development of industries such as aluminum plants, like Wah Chang Corporation located in Albany. The power, food, and lumber provided by Oregon helped fuel the development of the West, although the periodic fluctuations in the nation's building industry have hurt the state's economy on multiple occasions. That coupled with needs of World War II food production, shipbuilding and the lumber were also greatly enhanced throughout the state.

== Exports ==
81,000 manufacturing jobs in Oregon rely on exports which totaled $27.7 billion in 2023 with over $12.9 billion of the total going to countries in Asia.

The largest countries receiving exports from Oregon in 2023 were:

- Mexico ($6.6 billion)
- China ($4.0 billion)
- Canada ($3.5 billion)
- Malaysia ($2.6 billion)
- Ireland ($1.3 billion)

The state's top exports in 2023 by category were:

- computer and electronic products ($8.7 billion)
- transportation equipment ($7.0 billion)
- machinery except electrical ($3.7 billion)
- chemicals ($1.5 billion)
- plastics and rubber products ($667 million)

== Sectors ==
=== Agriculture ===
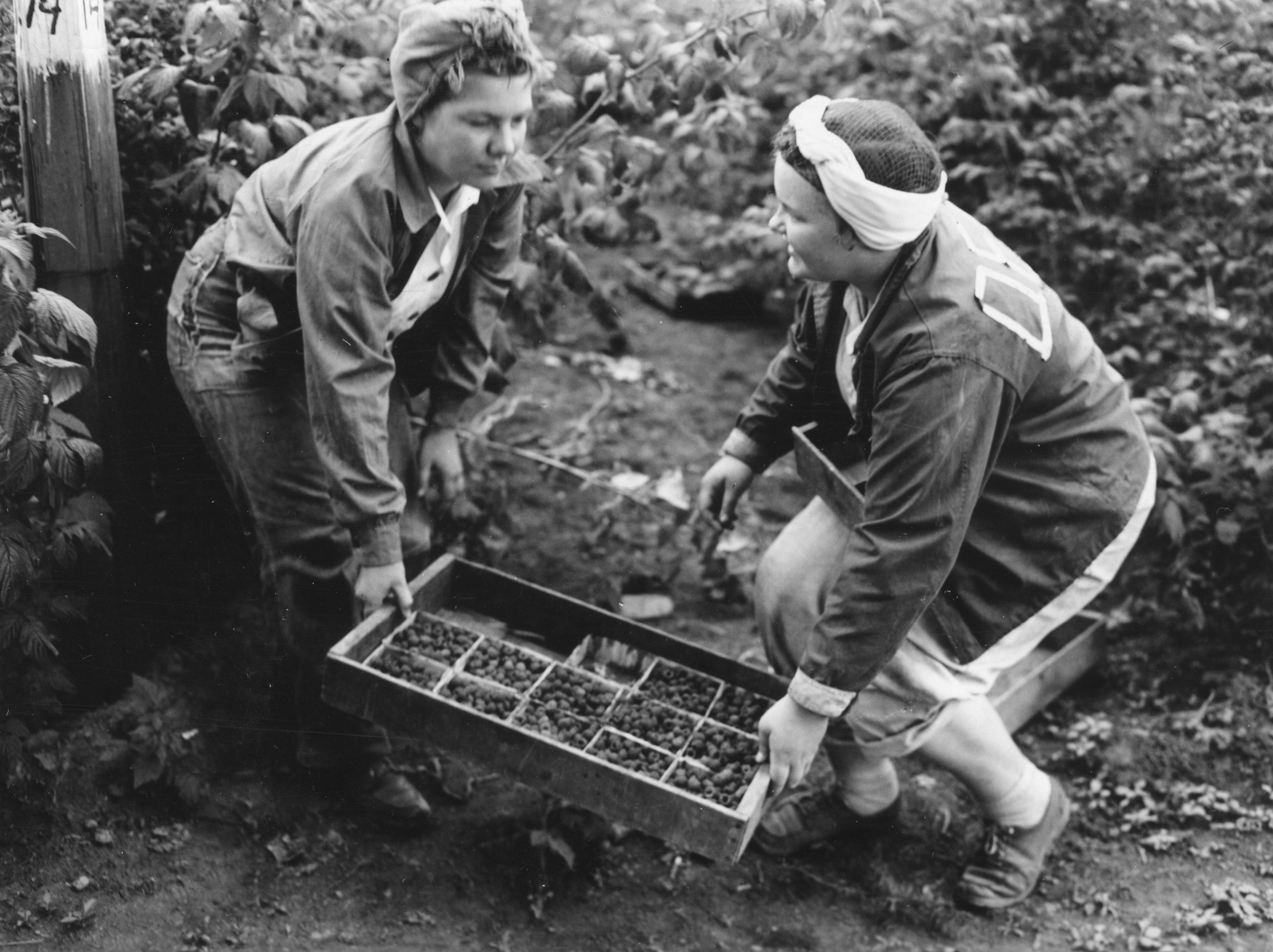
Teenagers harvesting berries in Boring, 1946

Oregon's diverse landscapes provide ideal environments for various types of farming. Land in the Willamette Valley owes its fertility to the Missoula Floods, which deposited lake sediment from Glacial Lake Missoula in western Montana onto the valley floor. In 2016, the Willamette Valley region produced over 100 million pounds (45 kt) of blueberries. The industry is governed and represented by the Oregon Department of Agriculture.

Oregon is also one of four major world hazelnut (Corylus avellana) growing regions, and produces 95% of the domestic hazelnuts in the United States. While the history of the wine production in Oregon can be traced to before Prohibition, it became a significant industry beginning in the 1970s. In 2005, Oregon ranked third among U.S. states with 303 wineries. Due to regional similarities in climate and soil, the grapes planted in Oregon are often the same varieties found in the French regions of Alsace and Burgundy. In 2014, 71 wineries opened in the state. The total is currently 676, which represents growth of 12% over 2013.

In the southern Oregon coast, commercially cultivated cranberries account for about 7 percent of U.S. production, and the cranberry ranks 23rd among Oregon's top 50 agricultural commodities. Cranberry cultivation in Oregon uses about 27,000 acres (110 square kilometers) in southern Coos and northern Curry counties, centered around the coastal city of Bandon. In the northeastern region of the state, particularly around Pendleton, both irrigated and dry land wheat is grown. Oregon farmers and ranchers also produce cattle, sheep, dairy products, eggs and poultry.

Caneberries (Rubus) are farmed here. Stamen blight (Hapalosphaeria deformans) is significant here and throughout the PNW. Here it especially hinders commercial dewberries.

Phytophthora ramorum was first discovered in the 1990s on the California Central Coast and was quickly found here as well. P. ramorum is of economic concern due to its infestation of Rubus and Vaccinium spp. (including cranberry and blueberry).

Peaches grown in the Willamette Valley are mostly sold directly and do not enter the more distant markets. OSU Extension recommended several peach and nectarine cultivars for Willamette.

An Emerald Ash Borer (Agrilus planipennis) infestation has been sighted in Forest Grove, the first for Western North America. On June 30, 2022, an off-duty invasion biologist noticed an infested tree and the Emerald Ash Borer Readiness and Response Plan for Oregon – finalized in March of the previous year – was quickly enacted by state departments. The public is asked to report sightings to the state Department of Agriculture.

=== Forestry and fisheries ===
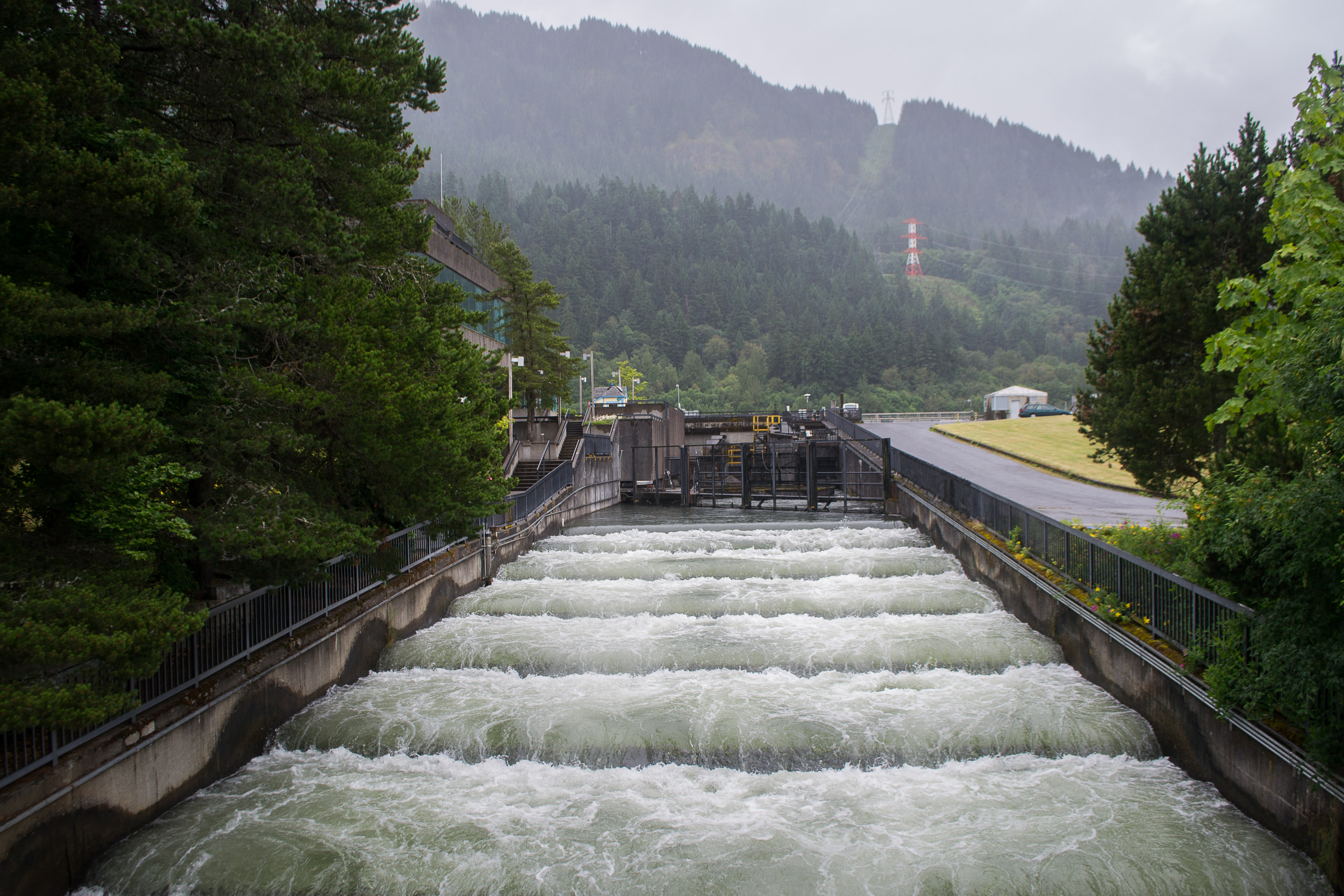
Fish ladder at Bonneville Dam, Multnomah County

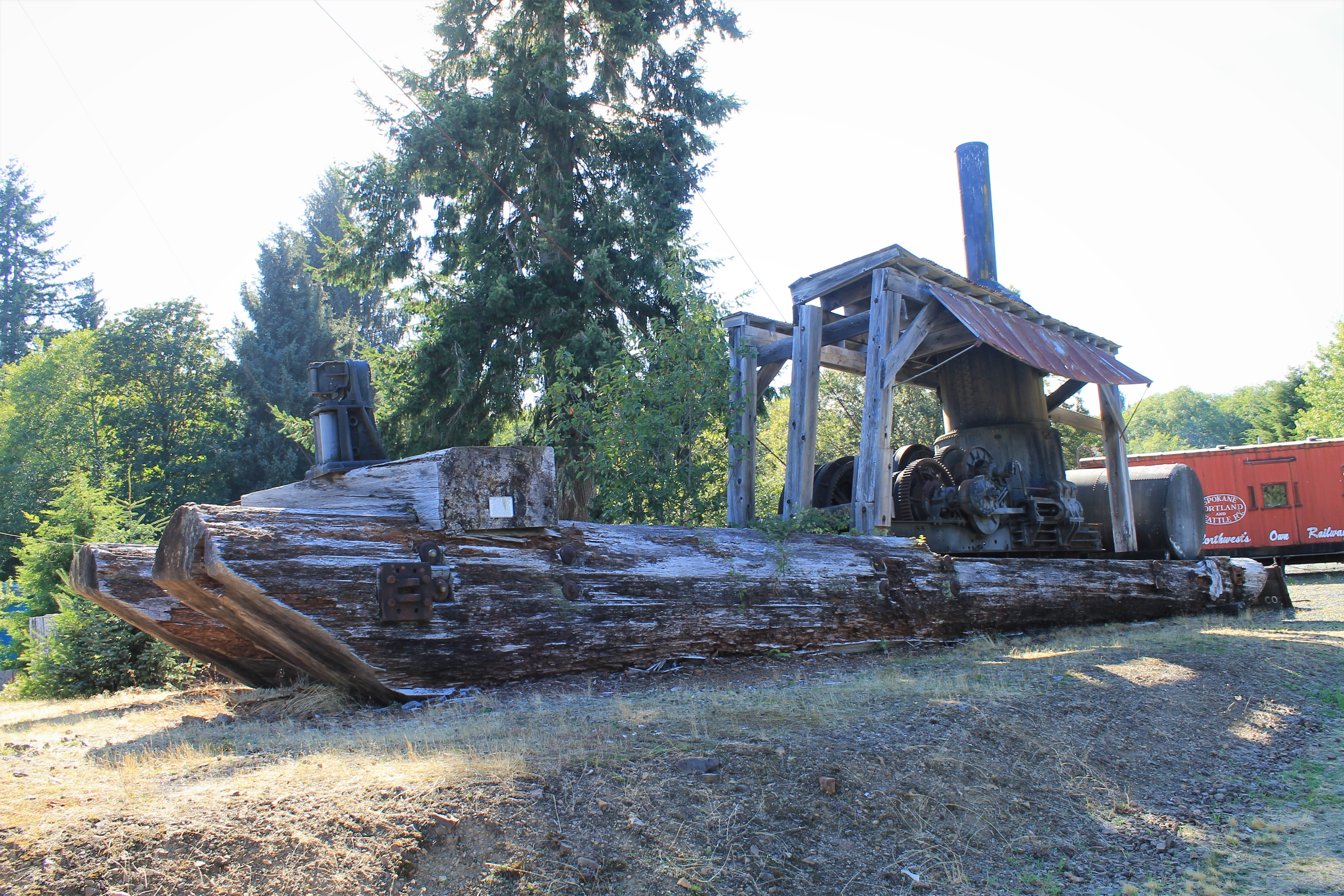
Historic Lumber Sled at Camp 18 in Elsie

Vast forests have historically made Oregon one of the nation's major timber-producing and logging states, but forest fires (such as the Tillamook Burn), over-harvesting, and lawsuits over the proper management of the extensive federal forest holdings have reduced the timber produced. Between 1989 and 2011, the amount of timber harvested from federal lands in Oregon dropped about 90%, although harvest levels on private land have remained relatively constant.

Even the shift in recent years towards finished goods such as paper and building materials has not slowed the decline of the timber industry in the state. The effects of this decline have included Weyerhaeuser's acquisition of Portland-based Willamette Industries in January 2002, the relocation of Louisiana-Pacific's corporate headquarters from Portland to Nashville, and the decline of former lumber company towns such as Gilchrist. Despite these changes, Oregon still leads the United States in softwood lumber production; in 2011, 4,134 million board feet (9,760,000 m^{3}) was produced in Oregon, compared with 3,685 million board feet (8,700,000 m^{3}) in Washington, 1,914 million board feet (4,520,000 m^{3}) in Georgia, and 1,708 million board feet (4,030,000 m^{3}) in Mississippi. The slowing of the timber and lumber industry has caused high unemployment rates in rural areas.

Oregon has one of the largest salmon-fishing industries in the world, although ocean fisheries have reduced the river fisheries in recent years. Because of the abundance of waterways in the state, it is also a major producer of hydroelectric energy.

=== Tourism and entertainment ===
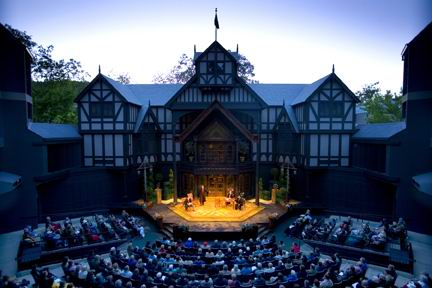
Elizabethan stage at the Oregon Shakespeare Festival in Ashland

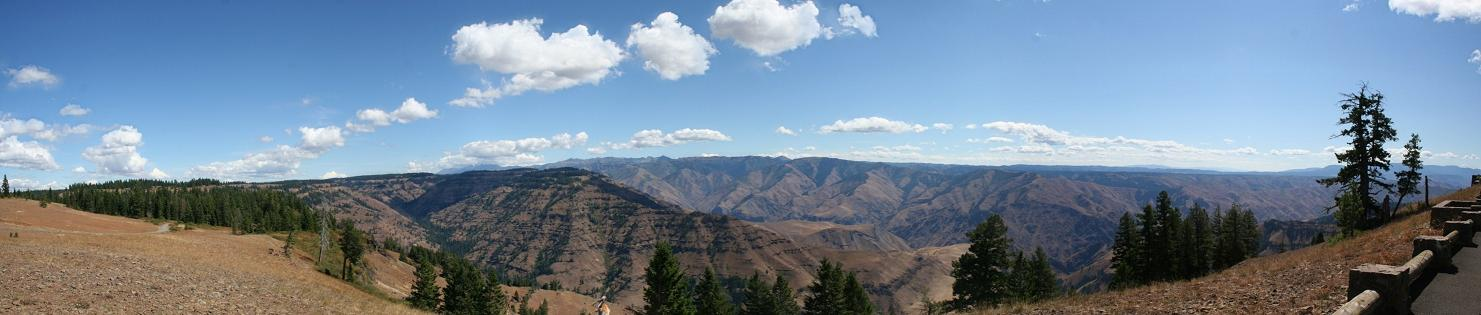
Hells Canyon is one of the largest canyons in the United States.

Tourism is also a strong industry in the state. Tourism is centered on the state's natural features – mountains, forests, waterfalls, rivers, beaches and lakes, including Crater Lake National Park, Multnomah Falls, the Painted Hills, the Deschutes River, and the Oregon Caves. Mount Hood and Mount Bachelor also draw visitors year-round for skiing and other snow activities.

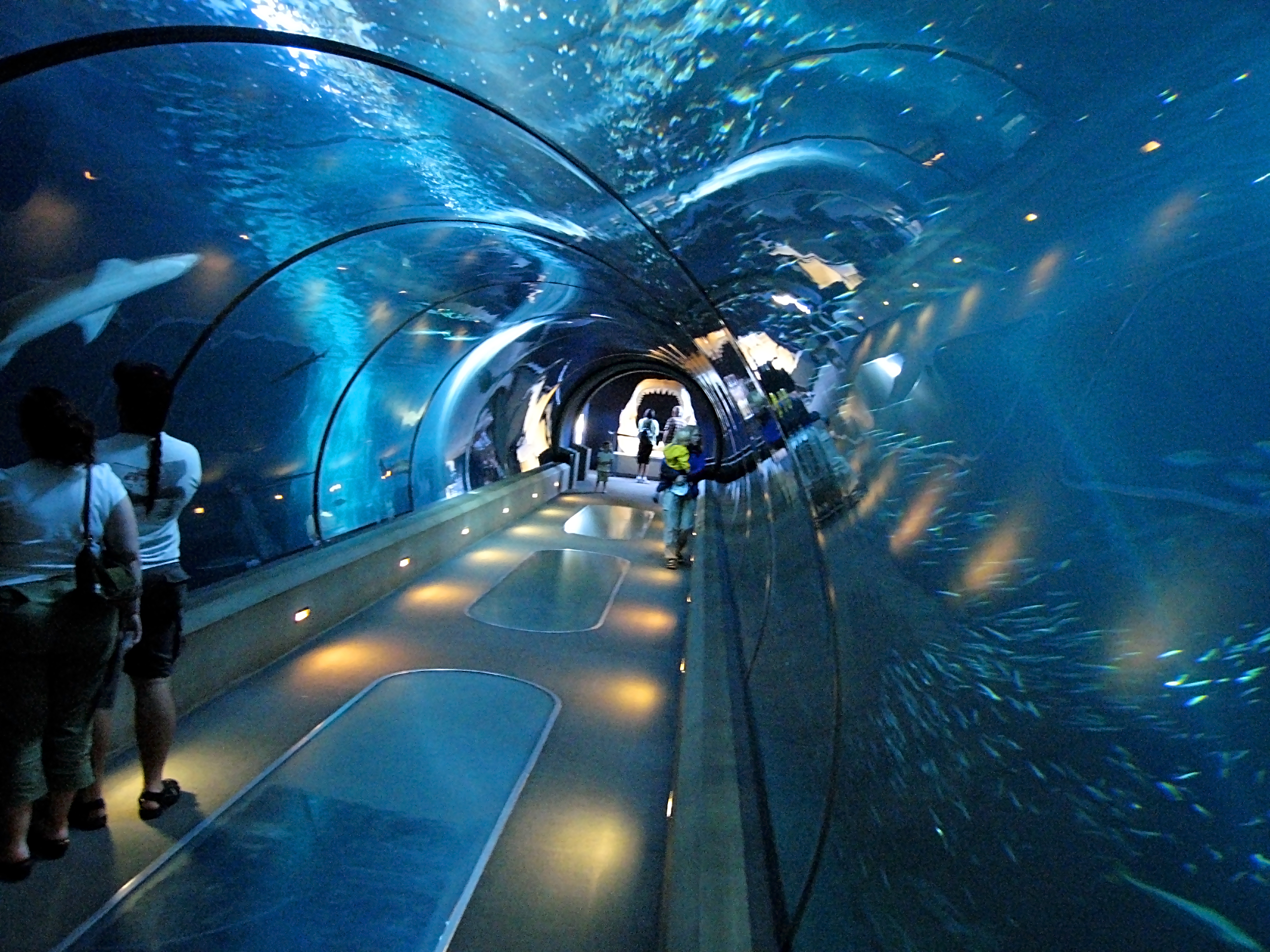
Oceanarium at the Oregon Coast Aquarium

Portland is home to the Oregon Museum of Science and Industry, the Portland Art Museum, and the Oregon Zoo, which is the oldest zoo west of the Mississippi River. The International Rose Test Garden is another prominent attraction in the city. Portland has also been named the best city in the world for street food by several publications, including the U.S. News & World Report and CNN. Oregon is home to many breweries, and Portland has the largest number of breweries of any city in the world.

The state's coastal region produces significant tourism as well. The Oregon Coast Aquarium comprises 23 acres (9.3 ha) along Yaquina Bay in Newport, and was also home to Keiko the orca whale. It has been noted as one of the top ten aquariums in North America. Fort Clatsop in Warrenton features a replica of Lewis and Clark's encampment at the mouth of the Columbia River in 1805. The Sea Lion Caves in Florence are the largest system of sea caverns in the United States, and also attract many visitors.

In Southern Oregon, the Oregon Shakespeare Festival, held in Ashland, is also a tourist draw, as is the Oregon Vortex and the Wolf Creek Inn State Heritage Site, a historic inn where Jack London wrote his 1913 novel Valley of the Moon.

Oregon has also historically been a popular region for film shoots due to its diverse landscapes, as well as its proximity to Hollywood. Movies filmed in Oregon include: Animal House, Free Willy, The General, The Goonies, Kindergarten Cop, One Flew Over the Cuckoo's Nest, and Stand By Me. Oregon native Matt Groening, creator of The Simpsons, has incorporated many references from his hometown of Portland into the TV series. Additionally, several television shows have been filmed throughout the state including Portlandia, Grimm, Bates Motel, and Leverage. The Oregon Film Museum is located in the old Clatsop County Jail in Astoria. Additionally, the last remaining Blockbuster store is located in Bend.

=== Technology ===
High technology industries located in Silicon Forest have been a major employer since the 1970s. Tektronix was the largest private employer in Oregon until the late 1980s. Intel's creation and expansion of several facilities in eastern Washington County continued the growth that Tektronix had started. Intel, the state's largest for-profit private employer, operates four large facilities, with Ronler Acres, Jones Farm and Hawthorn Farm all located in Hillsboro.

The spinoffs and startups that were produced by these two companies led to establishment of the so-called Silicon Forest. The recession and dot-com bust of 2001 hit the region hard; many high technology employers reduced the number of their employees or went out of business. Open Source Development Labs made news in 2004 when they hired Linus Torvalds, developer of the Linux kernel. In 2010, biotechnology giant Genentech opened a $400 million facility in Hillsboro to expand its production capabilities. Oregon is home to several large datacenters that take advantage of cheap power and a climate conducive to reducing cooling costs. Google operates a large datacenter in The Dalles, and Facebook built a large datacenter near Prineville in 2010. Amazon opened a datacenter near Boardman in 2011, and a fulfillment center in Troutdale in 2018.

=== Healthcare ===
For health insurance, as of 2018 Cambia Health Solutions has the highest market share at 21%, followed by Providence Health. In the Portland region, Kaiser Permanente leads. Providence and Kaiser are vertically integrated delivery systems which operate hospitals and offer insurance plans. Aside from Providence and Kaiser, hospital systems which are primarily Oregon-based include Legacy Health mostly covering Portland, Samaritan Health Services with five hospitals in various areas across the state, and Tuality Healthcare in the western Portland metropolitan area. In Southern Oregon, Asante runs several hospitals, including Rogue Regional Medical Center. Some hospitals are operated by multi-state organizations such as PeaceHealth and CommonSpirit Health. Some hospitals such Salem Hospital operate independently of larger systems.

Oregon Health & Science University is a Portland-based medical school that operates two hospitals and clinics.

The Oregon Health Plan is the state's Medicaid managed care plan, and it is known for innovations. The Portland area is a mature managed care and two-thirds of Medicare enrollees are in Medicare Advantage plans.

== Taxes and budgets ==
Oregon's biennial state budget, $2.6 billion in 2017, comprises General Funds, Federal Funds, Lottery Funds, and Other Funds.

Oregon is one of only five states that have no sales tax. Oregon voters have been resolute in their opposition to a sales tax, voting proposals down each of the nine times they have been presented. The last vote, for 1993's Measure 1, was defeated by a 75–25% margin.

The state also has a minimum corporate tax of only $150 a year, amounting to 5.6% of the General Fund in the 2005–07 biennium; data about which businesses pay the minimum is not available to the public. As a result, the state relies on property and income taxes for its revenue. Oregon has the fifth highest personal income tax in the nation. According to the U.S. Census Bureau, Oregon ranked 41st out of the 50 states in taxes per capita in 2005 with an average amount paid of 1,791.45.

A few local governments levy sales taxes on services: the city of Ashland, for example, collects a 5% sales tax on prepared food.

The City of Portland imposes an Arts Education and Access Income Tax on residents over 18—a flat tax of $35 collected from individuals earning $1,000 or more per year and residing in a household with an annual income exceeding the federal poverty level. The tax funds Portland school teachers, and art focused non-profit organizations in Portland.

The State of Oregon also allows transit district to levy an income tax on employers and the self-employed. The State currently collects the tax for TriMet and the Lane Transit District.

Oregon is one of six states with a revenue limit. The "kicker law" stipulates that when income tax collections exceed state economists' estimates by two percent or more, any excess must be returned to taxpayers. Since the enactment of the law in 1979, refunds have been issued for seven of the eleven biennia. In 2000, Ballot Measure 86 converted the "kicker" law from statute to the Oregon Constitution, and changed some of its provisions.

Federal payments to county governments that were granted to replace timber revenue when logging in National Forests was restricted in the 1990s, have been under threat of suspension for several years. This issue dominates the future revenue of rural counties, which have come to rely on the payments in providing essential services.

55% of state revenues are spent on public education, 23% on human services (child protective services, Medicaid, and senior services), 17% on public safety, and 5% on other services.

== Corporate headquarters ==
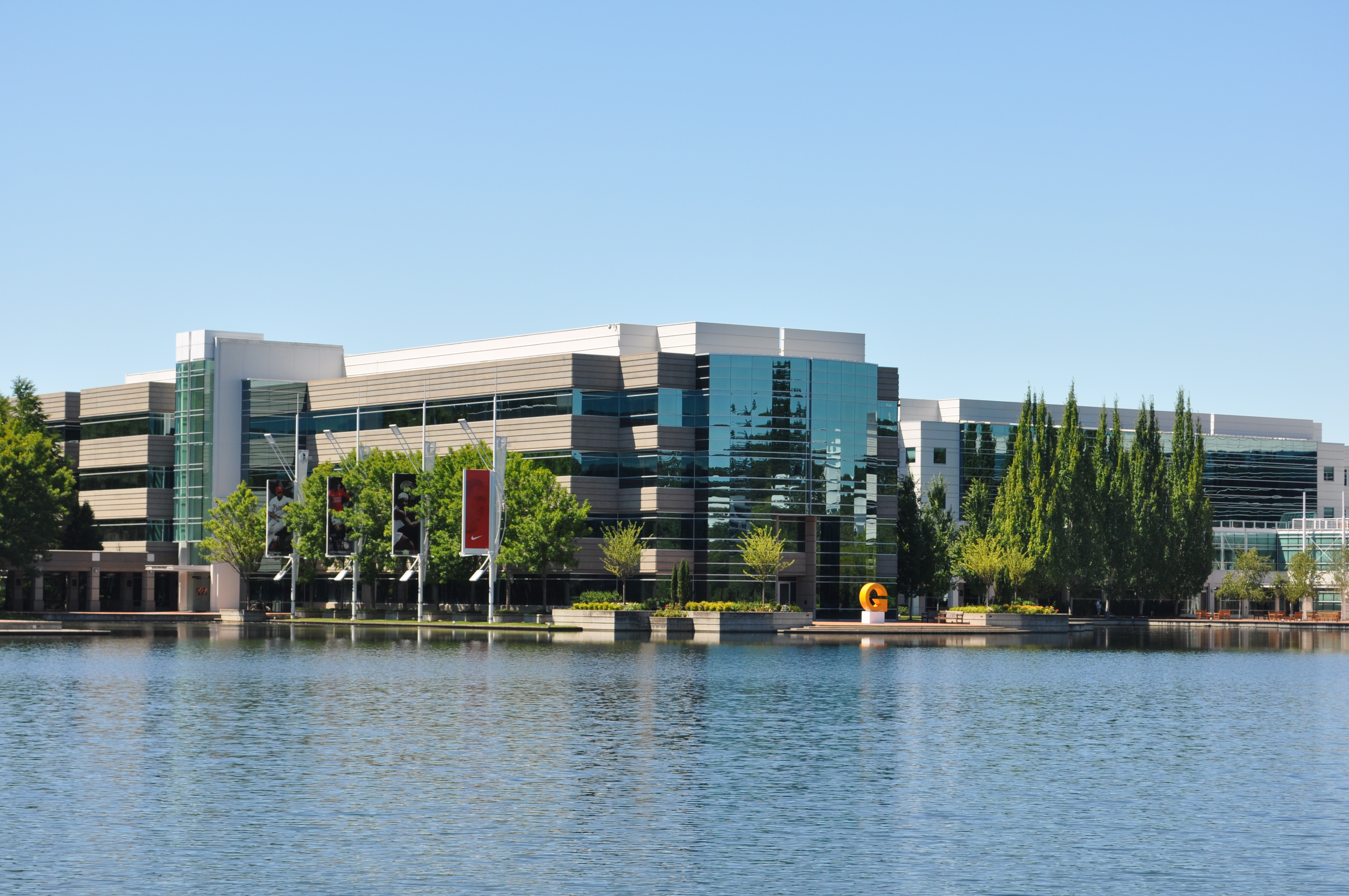
Nike headquarters near Beaverton

Oregon is also the home of large corporations in other industries. The world headquarters of Nike is located near Beaverton. Medford is home to Harry and David, which sells gift items under several brands. Medford is also home to the national headquarters of Lithia Motors. Portland is home to one of the West's largest trade book publishing houses, Graphic Arts Center Publishing. Oregon is also home to Mentor Graphics Corporation, a world leader in electronic design automation located in Wilsonville and employs roughly 4,500 people worldwide.

Adidas Corporations American Headquarters is located in Portland and employs roughly 900 full-time workers at its Portland campus. Nike, located in Beaverton, employs roughly 5,000 full-time employees at its 200-acre (81 ha) campus. Nike's Beaverton campus is continuously ranked as a top employer in the Portland area-along with competitor Adidas. Intel Corporation employs 22,000 in Oregon with the majority of these employees located at the company's Hillsboro campus located about 30 minutes west of Portland. Intel has been a top employer in Oregon since 1974.

Largest Public Corporations Headquartered in Oregon (December 2016)
#	Corporation	Headquarters	Market cap (billions US$)
1.	Nike	Beaverton	91.35
2.	FLIR Systems	Wilsonville	4.77
3.	Portland General Electric	Portland	4.05
4.	Columbia Sportswear	Beaverton	4.03
5.	Umpqua Holdings Corporation	Portland	3.68
6.	Lithia Motors	Medford	2.06
7.	Northwest Natural Gas	Portland	1.7
8.	The Greenbrier Companies	Lake Oswego	1.25

The U.S. Federal Government and Providence Health systems are respective contenders for top employers in Oregon with roughly 12,000 federal workers and 14,000 Providence Health workers.

Companies based in Oregon that are in the Fortune 1000 are Nike (90), Lithia Motors (124), The Greenbrier Companies (843), Portland General Electric (853), Columbia Sportswear (863), Radius Recycling (976), and KinderCare Learning Centers (1000).

== See also ==
- List of power stations in Oregon
- History of Oregon
- Oregon § Economy
