= List of films shot in Oregon =

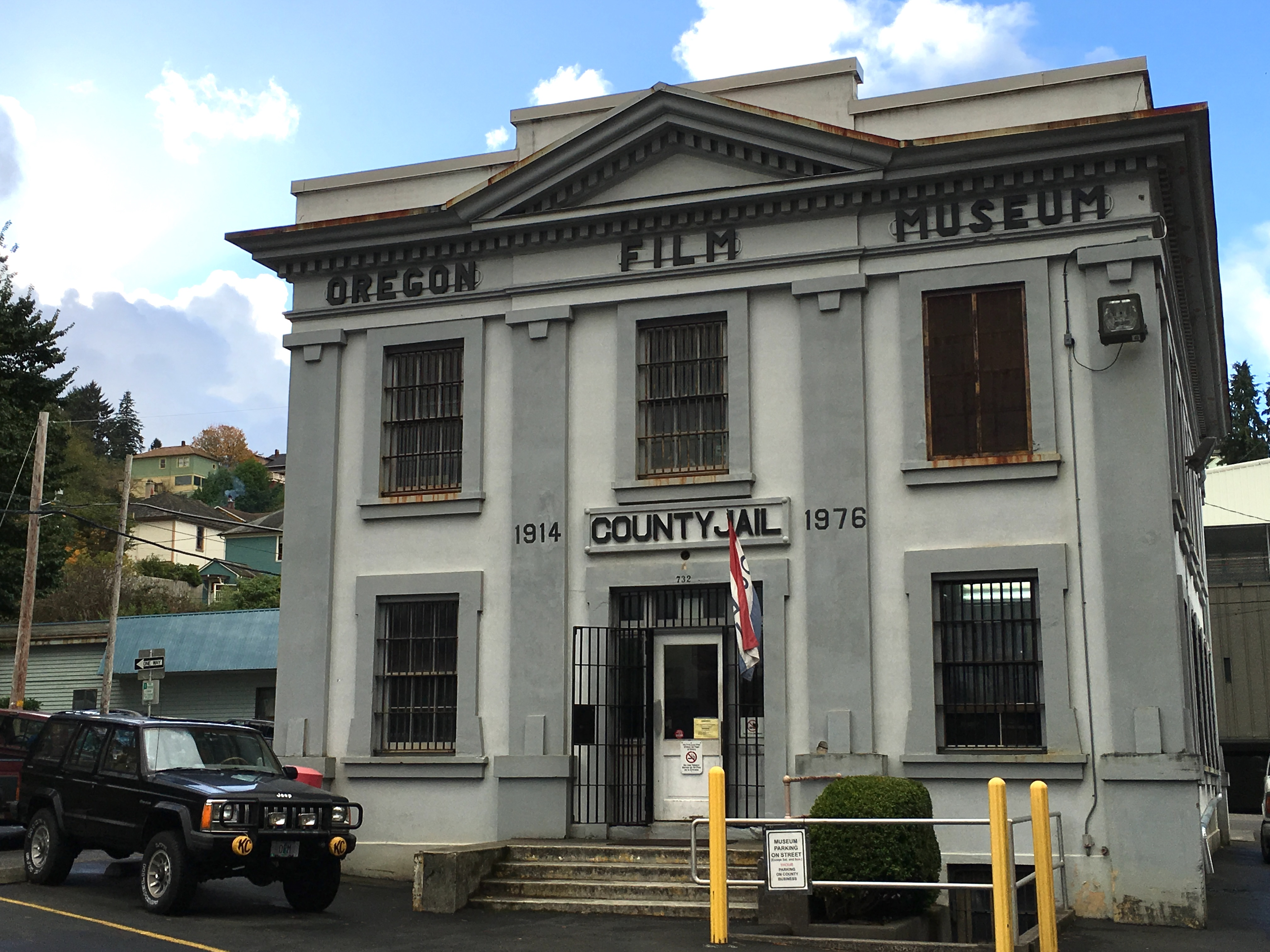
The Oregon Film Museum in Astoria; formerly the Clatsop County Jail, as featured in The Goonies (1985)

Throughout film history, the U.S. state of Oregon has been a popular shooting location for filmmakers due to its wide range of landscapes, as well as its proximity to California, specifically Hollywood. The first documented commercial film made in Oregon was a short silent film titled The Fisherman's Bride, shot in Astoria by the Selig Polyscope Company, and released in 1909. Another documentary short, Fast Mail, Northern Pacific Railroad, was shot in Portland in 1897.

Since then, numerous major motion pictures have been shot in the state, including F.W. Murnau's City Girl (1930), One Flew Over the Cuckoo's Nest (1975), Animal House (1978), Stand by Me (1986), Free Willy (1993), and Wild (2014). Portland—Oregon's largest city—has been a major shooting location for filmmakers, and has been featured prominently in the films of Gus Van Sant, namely Mala Noche (1985), Drugstore Cowboy (1989), My Own Private Idaho (1991), and Elephant (2003).

This list of films shot is organized first by region, and then chronologically by year. Some films may appear more than once if they were shot in more than one region.

== Northeast ==
Film	Year	Location(s)	Ref.
Where Cowboy is King	1915	Pendleton	
Passing on the West	1924	Pendleton	
Winds of Chance	1925	Wallowa County	
City Girl	1928	Athena; Pendleton	
Our Daily Bread	1928	Pendleton	
Singing Waters	1931	Pendleton	
The Lusty Men	1952	Pendleton	
The Great Sioux Uprising	1953	Pendleton	
Pillars of the Sky	1955	La Grande	
Paint Your Wagon	1969	Baker	
Napoleon and Samantha	1972	John Day	
Joe Bell	2020	La Grande	
The Year in Lincoln Plains	1987	Condon	
Homeward Bound: The Incredible Journey	1993	Joseph	
8 Seconds	1994	Pendleton	
Sammyville	1998	La Grande	
Dog Story	1999	La Grande	
New Life	2023	Joseph	
Breakup Season	2024	La Grande	

== Southeast ==
Film	Year	Location(s)	Ref.
Bronco Billy	1980	Malheur County; Ontario	
Meek's Cutoff	2010	Burns	
Lean on Pete	2018	Burns	

== Southwest ==
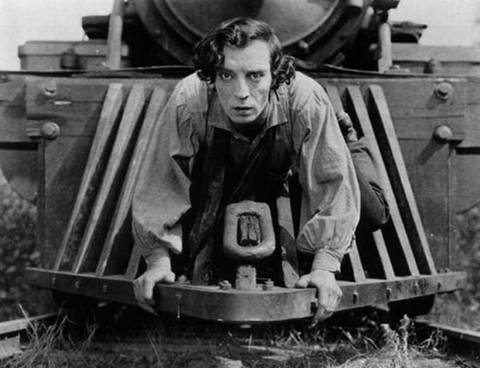
Buster Keaton in The General (1927)

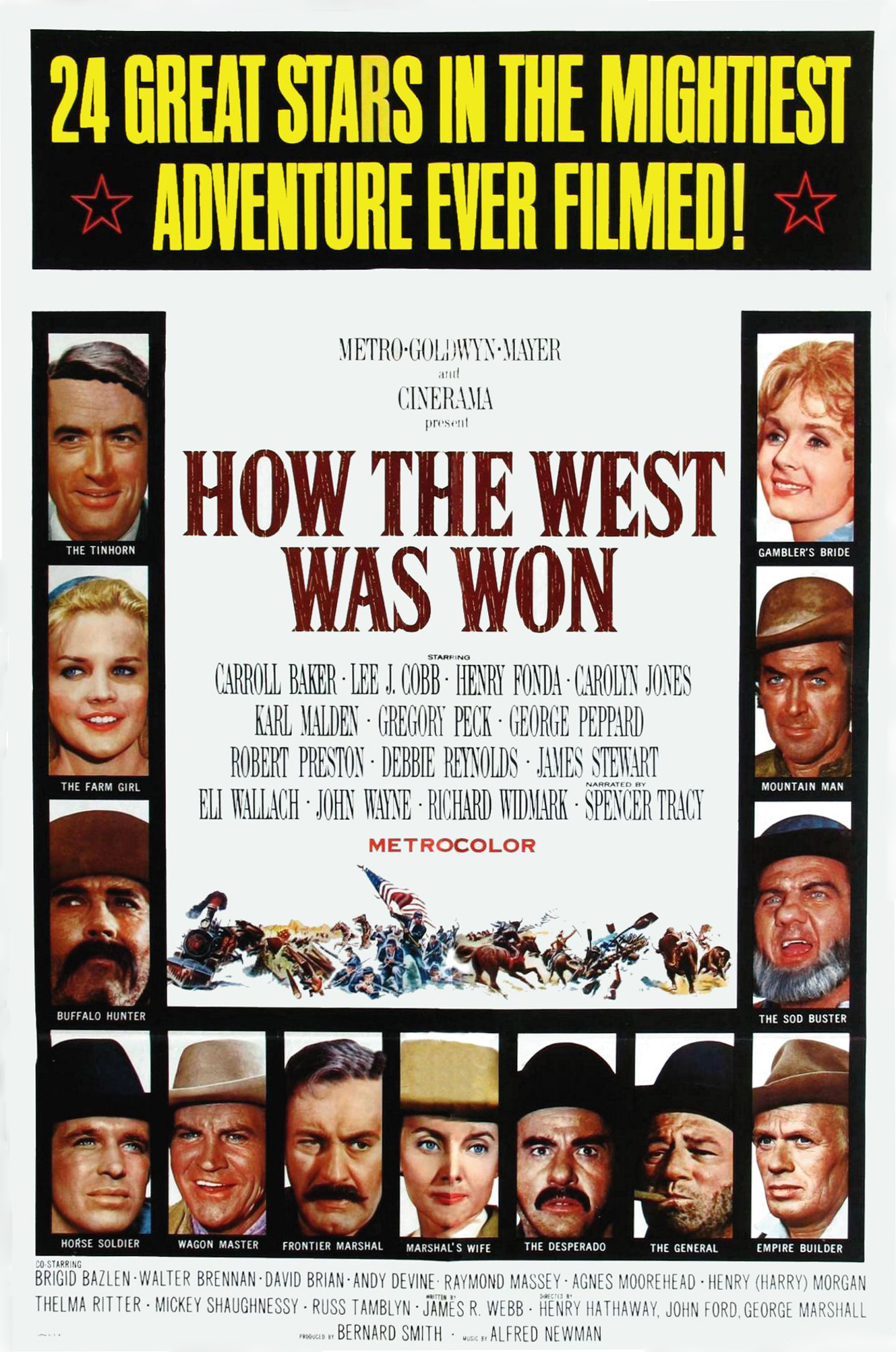
Poster art for How the West Was Won (1962)

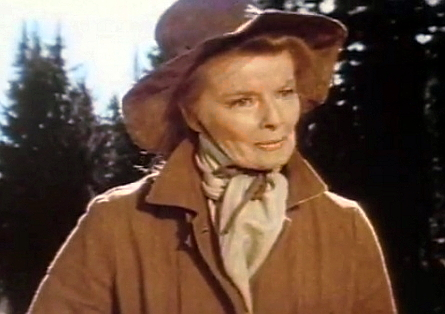
Katharine Hepburn in Rooster Cogburn (1975)

Film	Year	Location(s)	Ref.
Grace's Visit to the Rogue Valley	1915	Jackson County	
The Stolen Pie	1916	Klamath Falls	
Find Your Man	1924	Klamath Falls	
The Ice Flood	1926	Klamath Falls	
The General	1927	Cottage Grove	
The Reporter	1927	Medford; Jacksonville	
Ed's Coed	1929	Eugene	
Abe Lincoln in Illinois	1940	Eugene; McKenzie River	
Canyon Passage	1946	Diamond Lake; Umpqua National Forest	
Last of the Wild Horses	1948	Jacksonville	
Rachel and the Stranger	1948	Eugene	
How the West Was Won	1962	Grants Pass	
Fields of Honor	1964	Mohawk Valley; Eugene	
Shenandoah	1965	Marcola	
Mackenna's Gold	1969	Grants Pass	
Getting Straight	1970	Eugene	
Five Easy Pieces	1970	Eugene	
Drive, He Said	1971	Eugene	
The Great Northfield Minnesota Raid	1972	Jacksonville	
Emperor of the North	1973	Cottage Grove	
Lost in the Stars	1974	Cottage Grove	
Rooster Cogburn	1975	Grants Pass	
Street Girls	1975	Eugene	
Flood!	1976	Eugene; Brownsville; Sweet Home	
Animal House	1978	Eugene; Cottage Grove; Dexter	
How to Beat the High Cost of Living	1980	Eugene	
Hell and High Water	1981	Rogue River	
Personal Best	1982	Eugene	
Mystery Mansion	1983	Jacksonville	
Sacred Ground	1983	Chiloquin; Klamath Falls	
The Dream Chasers	1984	Medford; Jacksonville	
Stand by Me	1986	Eugene; Cottage Grove; Brownsville	
Inherit the Wind	1988	Jacksonville	
Spirit of the Eagle	1988	Grants Pass	
Finish Line	1988	Corvallis; Eugene	
Buster Keaton: A Hard Act to Follow	1988	Eugene	
Girl of the Limberlost	1989	Jacksonville	
Martial Marshal	1989	Jacksonville	
Grand Tour	1990	Eugene; Oakland; Drain	
Timescape	1992	Eugene	
Fire in the Sky	1993	Roseburg; Oakland	
Brainsmasher: A Love Story	1993	Portland	
The River Wild	1993	Grants Pass	
The Four Diamonds	1994	Eugene; McKenzie Pass	
Grizzly Mountain	1994	Grants Pass; Eugene	
Dead Man	1994	Grants Pass	
Without Limits	1996	Eugene	
Ricochet River	1997	Eugene, Cottage Grove	
Inconceivable	1997	Eugene	
Delicate Instruments	2000	Ashland; Medford	
Stealing Time	2000	Eugene	
Raspberry Heaven	2002	Ashland	
Indigo	2003	Ashland; Medford; Talent; Phoenix	
The Sisters	2004	Eugene; Cottage Grove	
Yesterday's Dreams	2004	Ashland	
Zerophilia	2004	Eugene; Cottage Grove	
Fahrenheit 9/11	2004	Florence	
Conversations With God	2005	Ashland	
Calvin Marshall	2007	Medford; Ashland	
My Name Is Bruce	2006	Medford	
Seraphim Falls	2006	McKenzie River	
Sixes and the One Eyed King	2006	Medford	
The Go-Getter	2007	Eugene	
Didi's Last Wish	2010	Oakland; Albany; Umpqua	
How to Die in Oregon	2011		
Redwood Highway	2013	Ashland; Talent; Phoenix; Grants Pass; Cave Junction; Brookings	
Night Moves	2013	Roseburg; Ashland; Medford	
Something Wicked	2014	Eugene	
Wild	2014	Ashland	
Free to Play	2014	Medford	
Brother Nature	2016	Klamath Falls	
Black Road	2016	Ashland	
Phoenix, Oregon	2019	Klamath Falls	

== Northwest ==
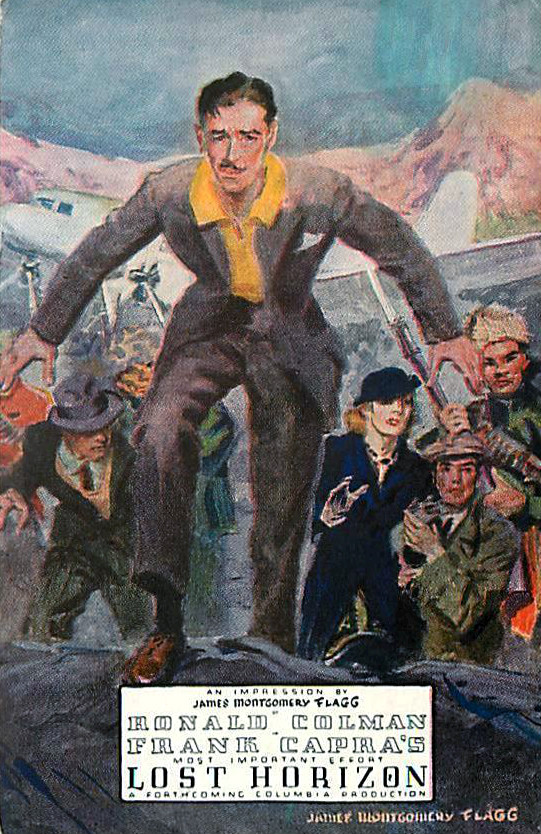
Poster for Lost Horizon (1937)

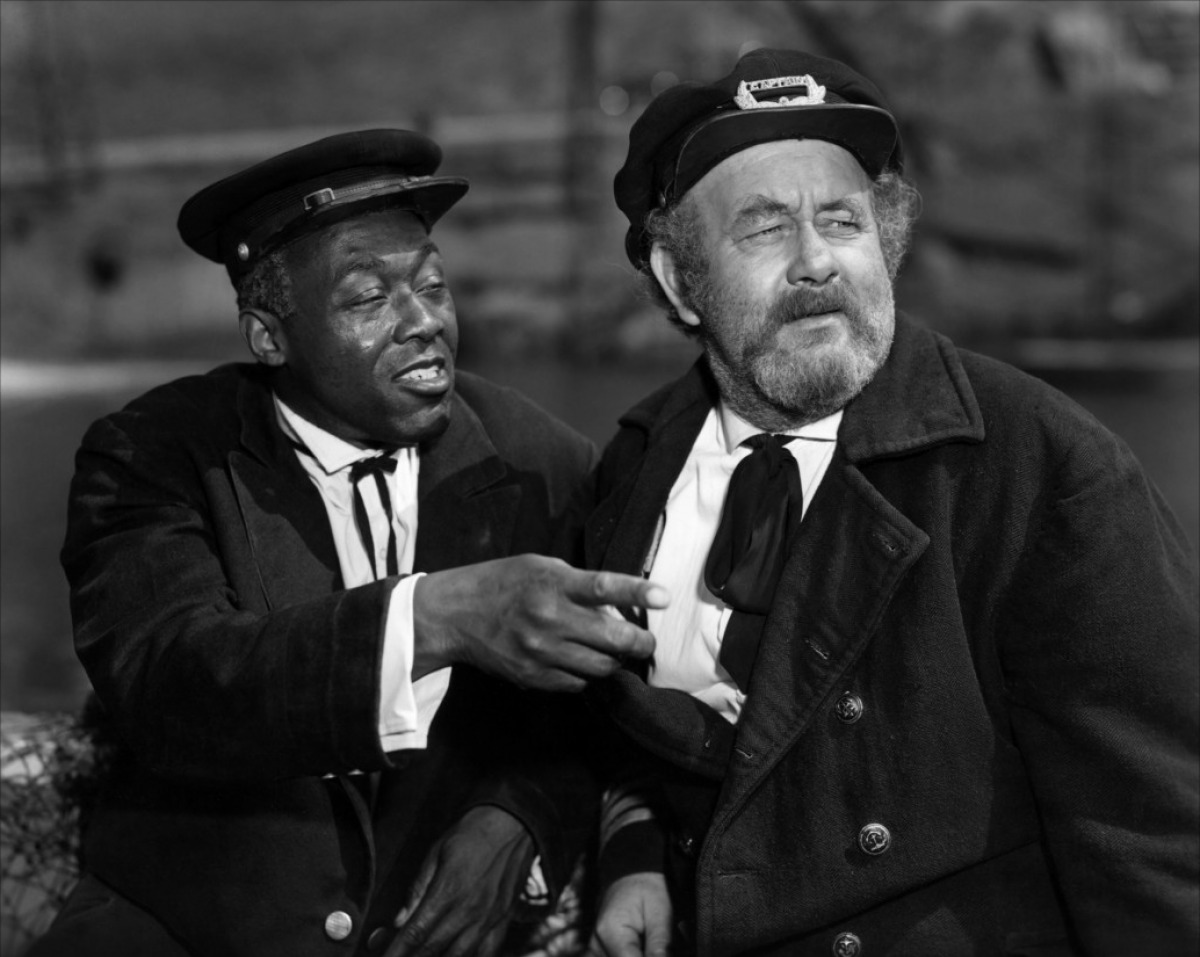
Stepin Fetchit and Chubby Johnson in Bend of the River (1952)

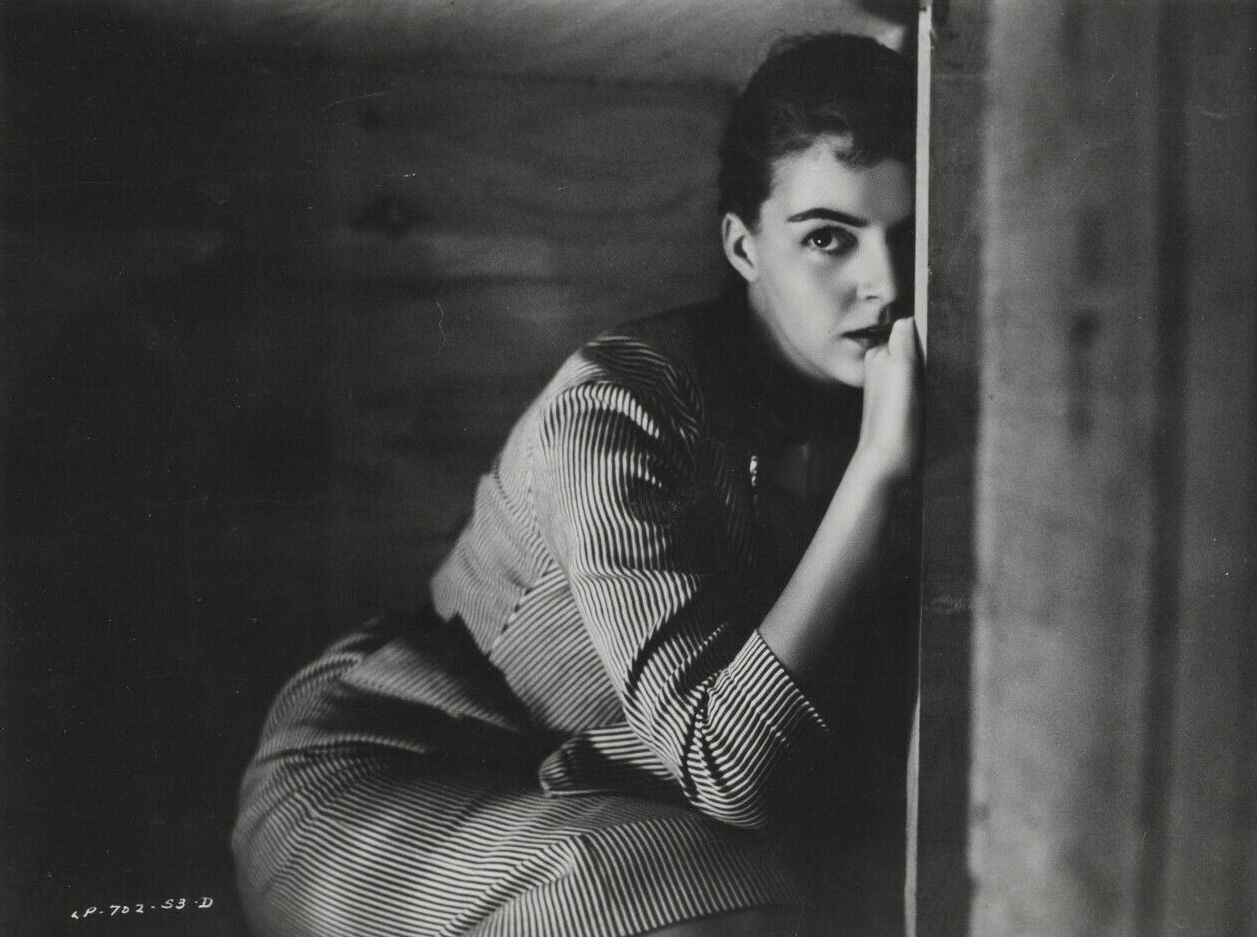
Carolyn Craig in Portland Exposé (1957)

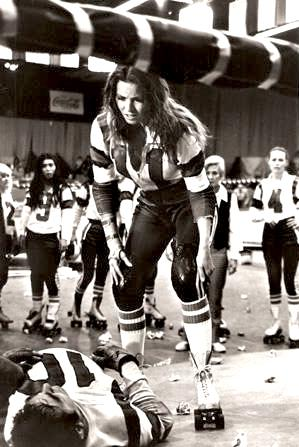
Raquel Welch in Kansas City Bomber (1972)

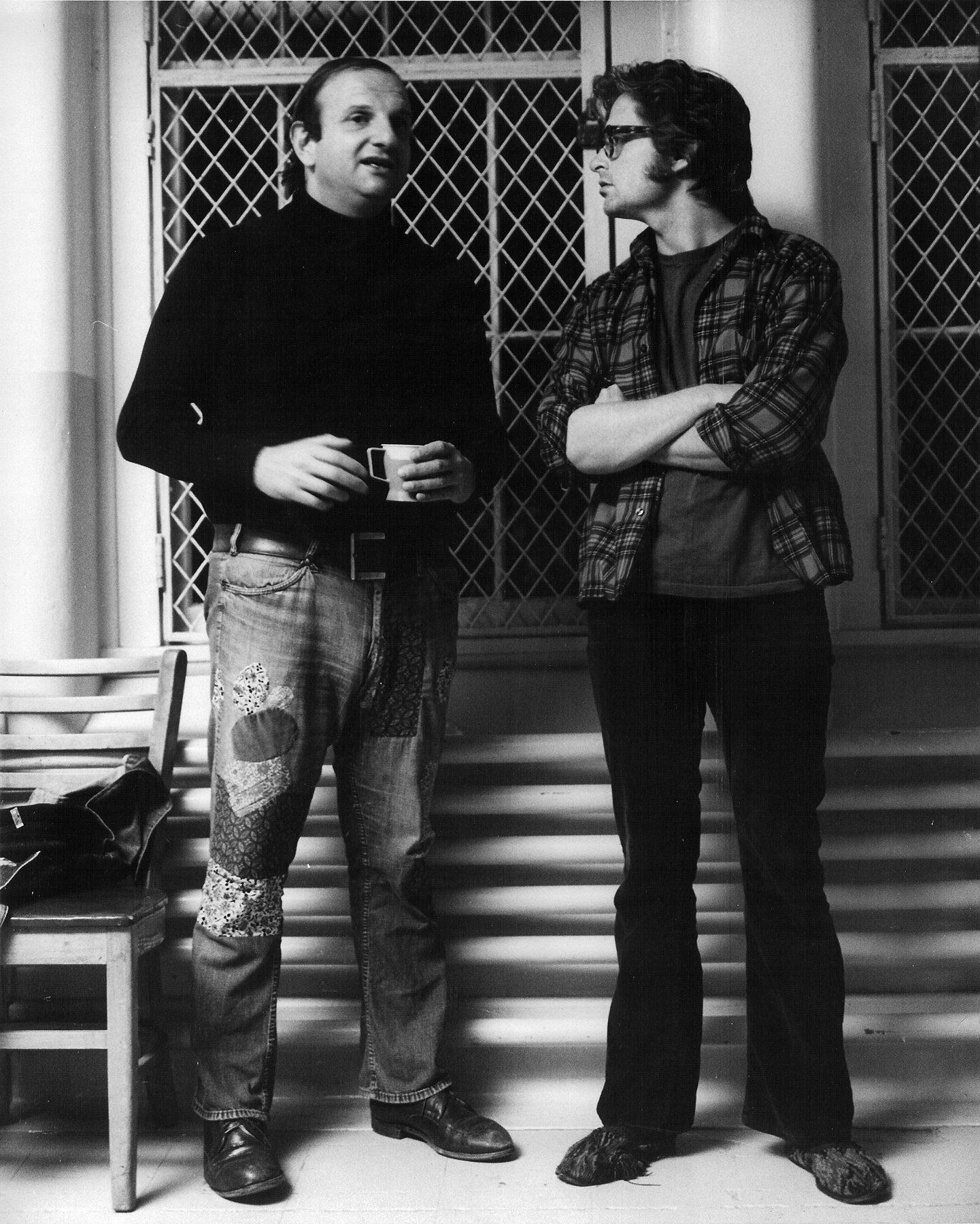
Screenwriter Bo Goldman and producer Michael Douglas on set of One Flew Over the Cuckoo's Nest (1975)

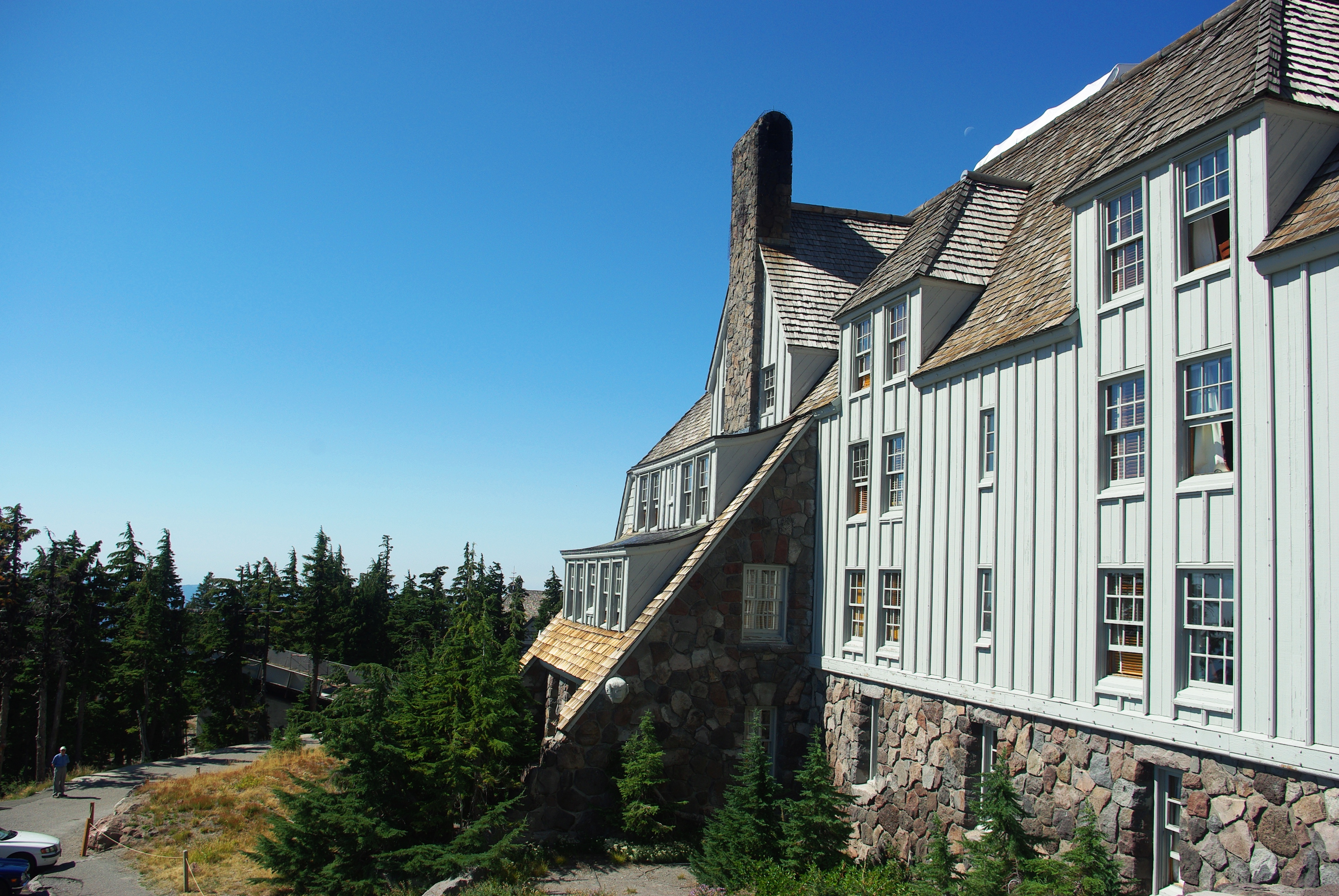
Timberline Lodge, exterior location of the Overlook Hotel in The Shining (1980)

Film	Year	Location(s)	Ref.
Fast Mail, Northern Pacific Railroad	1897	Portland area	
A Nugget In The Rough	1917	Portland; Oregon City; Columbia River Highway	
Martyrs of Yesterday (Note: Also known as In the Land of the Setting Sun)	1919	Oregon City; Portland	
The Golden Trail	1920	Portland	
Headed North	1920	Troutdale	
The Death Message	1922	Portland; Beaverton	
The Flash	1923	Portland; Beaverton	
The Frame Up	1923	Portland; Beaverton	
The Power Divine	1923	Portland; Beaverton	
The Vow of Vengeance	1923	Portland; Beaverton	
Way of the Transgressor	1923	Portland; Beaverton	
Beaten	1924	Portland; Beaverton	
Harbor Patrol	1924	Portland; Beaverton	
Under the Rouge	1925	Portland	
The Fighting Parson	1925	Tygh Valley	
Youth's Highway	1925	Portland; Beaverton	
Flames	1926	Portland	
Mystery House	1927	Mount Hood National Forest	
Call of the Wild	1935	Mount Baker Lodge	
Lost Horizon	1937	Mount Hood National Forest	
Thunderhead, Son of Flicka	1945	Gresham	
Golden Earrings	1947	Corbett	
Bend of the River	1952	Mount Hood; Palmer Glacier	
The Great Sioux Uprising	1953	Portland	
Portland Exposé	1957	Portland; Gresham	
A Day Called X	1957	Portland	
All the Young Men	1960	Timberline Lodge	
Ring of Fire	1961	Vernonia	
The Mightiest Clydesdale Paint Your Wagon	1969 1969	Estacada Baker City	
Five Easy Pieces	1970	Portland	
Kansas City Bomber	1972	Portland	
The Circle	1972	Portland	
Death of a Sideshow	1972	Portland	
Isn't It Shocking?	1973	Salem; Silverton	
Lost Horizon	1973	Mount Hood	
Closed Mondays	1974	Portland	
Deafula	1975	Portland	
One Flew Over the Cuckoo's Nest	1975	Salem	
The Possessed	1977	Portland	
First Love	1977	Portland	
Fire	1978	Yamhill County	
The Shining	1980	Timberline Lodge	
Paydirt	1980	Hood River, Newberg, Yamhill County	
Just Before Dawn	1981	Silver Falls State Park; Sublimity	
Unhinged	1982	Pittock Mansion; Portland	
The Courier of Death	1983	Portland	
Quarterback Princess	1983	McMinnville	
Off Sides	1983	Salem	
American Taboo	1984	Portland	
Station to Station	1984	Portland	
Toby's Gorilla	1984	Salem	
The Adventures of Mark Twain	1985	Portland	
Mala Noche	1985	Portland	
The Last Innocent Man	1985	Portland	
Short Circuit	1986	Portland, Columbia River Gorge	
Shadow Play	1986	Portland	
The Penalty Phase	1986	Portland, The Dalles	
Promise	1986	Salem; Dallas	
A Claymation Christmas Celebration	1987	Portland	
Permanent Record	1988	Portland	
Homer and Eddie	1988	Mount Hood; Oregon City	
The Watcher	1988	Portland	
Fatal Revenge	1988	Portland	
Meet the Raisins: The Story of the California Raisins	1988	Portland	
Drugstore Cowboy	1989	Portland	
Breaking In	1989	Portland	
The Haunting of Sarah Hardy	1989	Portland	
Spy	1989	Portland	
Dangerous Pursuit	1989	Portland	
Come See the Paradise	1989	Portland; Willamette Valley	
The California Raisin Show	1989	Portland	
The Vernonia Incident	1989	Vernonia	
Love at Large	1990	Portland	
Murder COD	1990	Portland	
Cops and Robbers	1990	Portland	
Fatal Exposure	1990	Portland	
The Favor	1990	Portland	
The Marla Hanson Story	1990	Portland	
Ironheart	1990	Portland	
Love & Dynamite	1990	Portland	
Ski School	1991	Mount Hood	
My Own Private Idaho	1991	Portland; Maupin	
Run	1991	Portland	
Child of Darkness, Child of Light	1991	Portland	
Deadly Game	1991	Portland; Columbia River Gorge	
Deceptions: A Mother's Secret	1991	Portland	
Frozen Assets	1991	Portland; Columbia River Gorge	
Wild Child	1991	Portland	
Chrome Soldiers	1991	Portland; Columbia County	
Claire of the Moon	1992	Portland	
Duplicates	1992	Portland area	
Body Language	1992	Portland	
Devils Keep	1992	Portland	
Programmed for Murder	1992	Portland; Wilsonville	
A Claymation Easter Special	1992	Portland	
Perfect Family	1992	Portland	
Dr. Giggles	1992	Portland	
Sam & Ed	1992	Portland	
The Bed You Sleep In	1992	Toledo	
Frameup	1992	Newport	
Fade to Black	1993	Portland	
Even Cowgirls Get The Blues	1993	Portland	
Free Willy	1993	Portland	
The Temp	1993	Portland	
Body of Evidence	1993	Portland	
Gayle Moffatt Story	1993	Portland	
Hear No Evil	1993	Portland; Columbia River Gorge	
Homeward Bound: The Incredible Journey	1993	Portland; Mount Hood National Forest; Columbia River Gorge	
Moment of Truth: Why My Daughter?	1993	Portland	
Brainsmasher... A Love Story	1993	Portland	
Praying Mantis	1993	Portland	
Terror in the Towers	1993	Portland	
Maverick	1993	Columbia River Gorge	
To My Daughter With Love	1993	Portland	
Save the Last Dance for Me	1993	Portland	
Imaginary Crimes	1993	Portland	
Guns on the Clackamas	1993	Oregon City	
Rose City	1994	Portland	
Medicine Ball	1994	Portland	
Mystery Dance	1994	Portland	
Mr. Holland's Opus	1994	Portland	
Gathering Evidence	1994	Salem	
The Ox and the Eye	1994	Portland	
Tinkercrank	1994	Portland	
Things I Never Told You	1995	St. Helens	
Foxfire	1995	Portland	
Assassins	1995	Portland	
Dead by Sunset	1995	Portland	
Lords of the Tanglewood	1995	Hood River	
Batman Forever	1995	Corbett	
Nowhere Man	1996	Portland area	
Reunion	1996	Portland	
Reggie's Prayer	1996	Portland	
Payback	1996	Portland	
Forest Warrior	1996	Hood River; Mount Hood National Forest	
In the Line of Duty: Blaze of Glory	1996	Portland	
The Catalyst	1997	Portland	
Total Reality	1997	Portland	
Zero Effect	1997	Portland	
Fifteen and Pregnant	1997	Sherwood; Portland	
Big Red	1997	Portland	
Anoosh of the Airways	1997	Portland	
Final Justice	1997	Portland	
Kurt & Courtney	1998	Portland	
A Change of Heart	1998	Portland	
Love is Strange	1998	Portland	
Physical Graffiti	1998	Scappoose; Portland	
Halloweentown	1998	St. Helens; Portland	
No Alibi	1998	Portland	
Bongwater	1998	Portland	
The Joyriders	1998	Columbia River Gorge; Portland	
Night Ride Home	1998	Portland; Oregon City; Aurora; Canby	
Take My Advice (Ann & Abby Story)	1999	Portland	
Hollyriridge	1999	Portland	
Switched at Birth	1999	Gresham; Portland	
The PJs	1999	Portland	
Double Jeopardy	1999	Salem	
Men of Honor	2000	Rainier; Portland	
The Sexy Chef	2000	Portland	
Gary & Mike	2000	Portland	
Pay It Forward	2000	Portland	
Therese: The Story of a Soul	2000	Portland; Salem	
Down and Out with The Dolls	2000	Portland	
Antitrust	2000	Portland	
Bandits	2000	Oregon City; Salem; Sandy; Silverton; Wilsonville	
A.I. Artificial Intelligence	2000	Gresham	
The Wise Ones	2000	Gresham	
Eban and Charley	2000	Portland,	
Extreme Days	2001	Canyonville; Columbia River Gorge; Portland	
The Hunted	2001	Oregon City; Portland; Salem	
The Ring	2002	Columbia River Gorge	
Don't You Cry For Me	2002	St. Helens	
The Dust Factory	2002	Mount Hood; Clatskanie; Hillsboro; Portland	
Jackass: The Movie	2002	Portland	
The Skin Horse	2002	Portland	
Sacred Science	2002	Portland	
Elephant	2002	Portland	
Coming Up Easy	2003	Portland	
Twilight Conspiracy	2003	Portland	
Mean Creek	2003	Estacada; Troutdale	
Harvest of Fear	2003	Estacada	
Losers Lounge	2003	Portland	
The Good Lot	2004	Portland	
Are We There Yet?	2004	Portland	
Bigger Than the Sky	2004	Portland	
Donut Hole	2004	Portland	
Nearing Grace	2004	Portland	
Monday Night Gig	2004	Portland	
Behind the Mask: The Rise of Leslie Vernon	2004	Banks; Estacada; Portland; St. Helens	
Damaged Goods	2004	Portland	
What the Bleep Do We Know!?	2004	Portland	
Thumbsucker	2005	Beaverton; Portland; Sherwood; Tigard; Tualatin; Vernonia	
Tillamook Treasure	2005	Vernonia	
Film Geek	2005	Gresham; Portland	
Path of Evil	2005	Portland	
Drama Queens	2005	Portland	
Spiral	2005	Portland	
Kate's Smile	2005	Portland	
Clear Cut: The Story of Philomath, Oregon	2006	Philomath	
Music Within	2006	Oregon City; Portland	
Feast of Love	2006	Portland	
Raising Flagg	2006	Portland; St. Helens	
Old Joy	2006	Colton; Portland	
Into the Wild	2006	Cascade Mountains	
The Sasquatch Gang	2006	Clackamas; Oregon City	
Paranoid Park	2006	Portland	
Mr. Brooks	2006	Portland	
Dark Horizon	2006	Salem	
Cathedral Park	2006	Arch Cape; Hood River; Mosier; Portland; St. Johns; Sauvie Island; Welches	
Untraceable	2007	Portland	
The Valley Of Light	2007	Scotts Mills	
Selfless	2007	Portland	
Follow	2007	Mount Hood; Portland	
Management	2007	Portland	
Street	2007	Portland	
The Auteur	2008	Portland	
The Burning Plain	2008	Portland	
Not Dead Yet	2008	Portland	
Twilight	2008	Estacada; Portland; St. Helens; Vernonia	
The Road	2008	Portland	
Without a Paddle: Nature's Calling	2009	Clackamas County; Portland area	
Wendy and Lucy	2008	Portland; Wilsonville	
Everyman's War	2008	Mount Hood; Scappoose; St. Helens	
Coraline	2009	Hillsboro animation studio	
Case 39	2009	Portland	
Extraordinary Measures	2009	Manzanita; Portland; Wilsonville	
Follow the Prophet	2009	Portland	
Diary of the Dorks	2010	Estacada	
The Presence	2010	Mount Hood National Forest	
A Walk in My Shoes	2010	Portland	
The River Why	2010	Portland	
Restless	2011	Portland	
Cold Weather	2011	The Dalles; Portland	
Rid of Me	2011	Multnomah Village; Portland	
Bucksville	2011	Portland; Vernonia; Zigzag	
1 Out of 7	2011	Portland	
Gone	2012	Portland	
The Kill Hole	2012	Portland	
ParaNorman	2012	Hillsboro animation studio	
The Boxtrolls	2013	Portland	
House of Last Things	2013	Portland	
Wild	2014	Cascade Locks; Government Camp	
10 Days in a Madhouse	2015	Salem	
All the Wilderness	2015	Portland	
Cabin Fever	2016	Portland	
Green Room	2016	Mount Hood National Forest; Portland	
The Benefits of Gusbandry	2016	Portland	
Birds of Neptune	2016	Portland	
Buddymoon	2016	Mount Hood National Forest	
Kubo and the Two Strings	2016	Portland	
Best Fake Friends	2016	Portland	
SEED: The Untold Story	2016	Portland	
I Don't Feel at Home in This World Anymore	2016	Portland	
Captain Fantastic	2016	Portland	
Lean on Pete	2018	Portland	
Bad Samaritan	2018	Portland	
Leave No Trace	2018	Estacada; Newberg; Portland; St. Johns	
Clementine	2019	Portland	
The Rental	2020	Portland	
Timmy Failure: Mistakes Were Made	2020	Portland; St. Johns	
Pig	2021	Portland; St. Johns	
Who's on Top?	2021	Mount Hood; Portland	
Wendell & Wild	2022	Portland	
Pinocchio	2022	Portland	
The Road Home	2022	Portland; Salem	
Half Sisters	2023	Portland; Salem; Silverton	
New Life	2023	Estacada; Portland; St. Johns	
Strange Darling	2024	Mount Hood Portland	
Night Always Comes	2025	Gresham; Portland	
Twinless	2025	Portland	

== Central ==
Film	Year	Location(s)	Ref.
The Indian Fighter	1955	Bend	
Oregon Passage	1957	Bend	
Tonka	1958	Bend	
Day of the Outlaw	1959	Bend	
The Incredible Journey	1963	Devils Lake; Terrebonne; Three Sisters	
Strike Me Deadly	1963	Bend	
Mara of the Wilderness	1965	Deschutes National Forest	
The Way West	1967	Bend; Crooked River	
American Wilderness	1971	Central Oregon; Rogue River	
Rooster Cogburn	1975	Bend	
The Apple Dumpling Gang	1975	Bend	
Sasquatch, the Legend of Bigfoot	1976	Bend; Sisters	
St. Helens	1981	Bend; Mount Bachelor	
Up the Creek	1984	Bend	
From Oregon With Love	1984	Central Oregon	
From Oregon With Love III	1990	Central Oregon	
Love at Large	1990	Bend; Portland	
White Wolves	1992	Bend	
Even Cowgirls Get The Blues	1993	Bend; Terrebonne	
The Postman	1997	Central Oregon	
Salvation	1998	Bend	
Swordfish	2001	Smith Rock	
Management	2008	Madras	
The Wait	2013	Bend; Black Butte Ranch; Sisters	

== Coastal ==
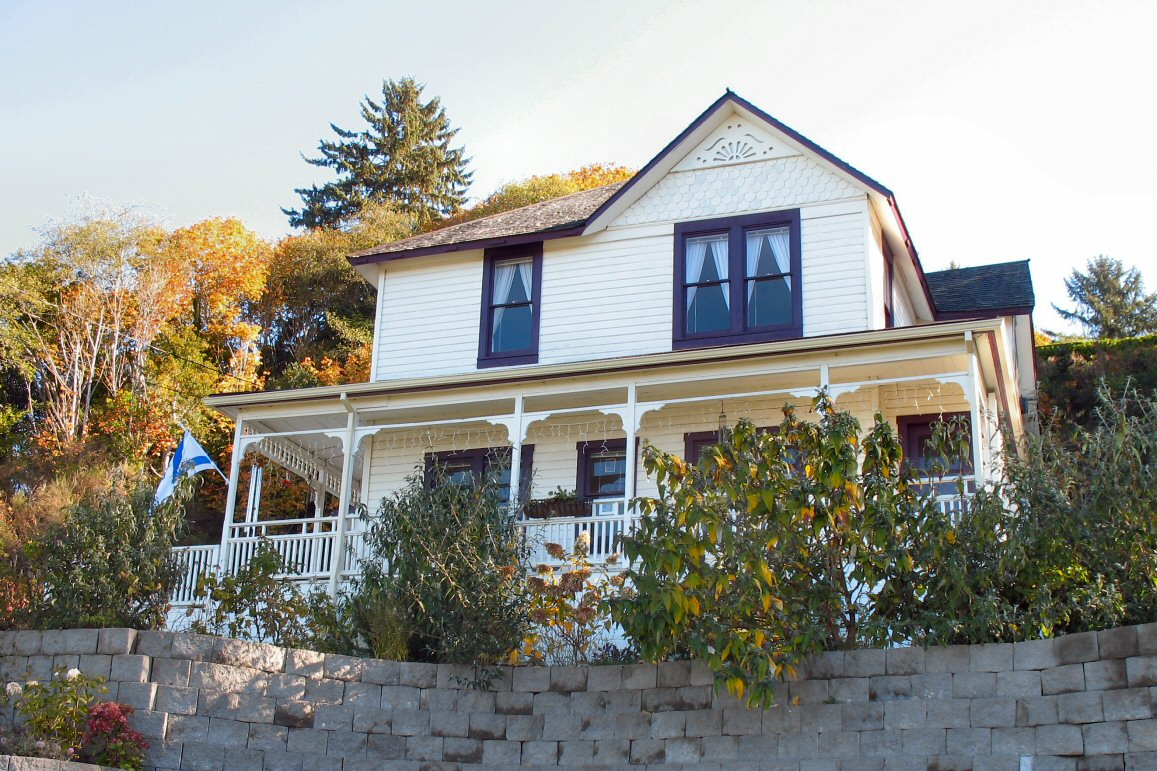
The house featured prominently in The Goonies (1985) in Astoria

Film	Year	Location(s)	Ref.
The Fisherman's Bride	1909	Astoria	
The Great Race	1965	Gearhart	
1941	1979	Cannon Beach; Gold Beach	
Sometimes a Great Notion	1971	Newport; Toledo	
One Flew Over the Cuckoo's Nest	1975	Central Coast	
The Sea Gypsies	1978	Gold Beach	
The Lathe of Heaven	1980	Agate Beach	
Hysterical	1981	Cannon Beach; Depoe Bay; Newport	
California Mix	1981	Astoria	
Blood Song	1982	Coos Bay; North Bend	
Cry for the Stranger	1982	Florence	
The Final Terror	1983	Oregon Redwoods	
American Taboo	1984	Fort Stevens State Park	
The Goonies	1985	Astoria; Cannon Beach; Ecola State Park	
Short Circuit	1986	Astoria	
Benji the Hunted	1986	Astoria; Newport	
Overboard	1987	Newport	
Permanent Record	1988	Yaquina Head	
The Haunting of Sarah Hardy	1989	North Coast	
Come See the Paradise	1989	Astoria	
Kindergarten Cop	1990	Astoria; Ecola State Park	
Teenage Mutant Ninja Turtles III	1993	Astoria	
Fallen Fortress at Cape Lookout	1990	Cape Lookout	
Shattered	1991	Nehalem; Neahkahnie Mountain; Oswald West State Park	
Point Break	1991	Ecola State Park; Wheeler	
Claire of the Moon	1992	Oregon Coast	
Free Willy	1993	Astoria; Ecola State Park; Warrenton	
The Temp	1993	Cannon Beach; Manzanita	
Fallen Fortress	1993	Cape Lookout	
Free Willy 2: The Adventure Home	1994	Astoria	
The Ox and the Eye	1994	Coos Bay	
Good Luck	1996	Coos Bay	
World Traveler	2000	Enterprise; Pacific City	
Eban and Charley	2000	Astoria; Seaside	
The Ring	2002	Newport; Columbia River Gorge	
The Ring 2	2004	Astoria	
Tillamook Treasure	2005	Manzanita; Tillamook	
Into the Wild	2006	Astoria	
Cthulhu	2007	Astoria	
The Burning Plain	2008	Depoe Bay; Newport; Portland	
Twilight	2008	Ecola State Park; North Coast	
Prom Night	2008	Newport	
Extraordinary Measures	2009	Portland; Manzanita; Wilsonville	
Cold Weather	2011	Cannon Beach	
Green Room	2016	Astoria	
Deadliest Catch: Dungeon Cove	2016	Newport	
The Mortuary Collection	2019	Astoria	
Clementine	2019	Florence	
The Forgotten Battalion	2020	Tillamook County	
The Rental	2020	Bandon	
Who's on Top?	2021	Ecola State Park	
Sometimes I Think About Dying	2023	Astoria	
New Life	2023	Enterprise	

== Other ==
- According to a list provided by the Oregon Film Council, the following films were shot in Oregon; however, specific locations and cities were not documented.

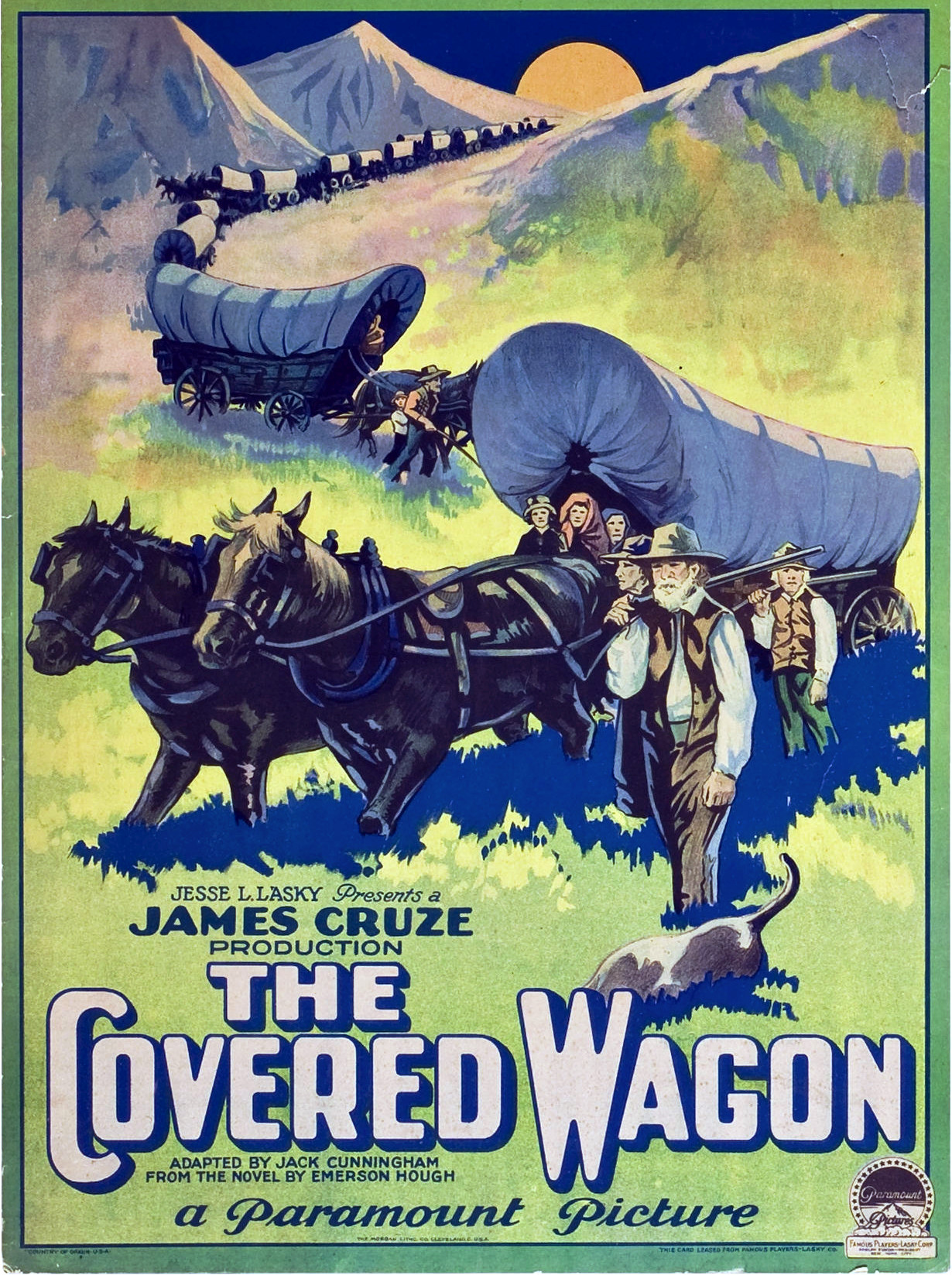
The Covered Wagon (1923) poster

Film	Year	Location
Barriers of Folly	1922	Unknown
Bulldog Courage	1922	Unknown
His Last Assignment	1922	Unknown
The Mine Looters	1922	Unknown
The Range Patrol	1922	Unknown
Underground Trail	1922	Unknown
The Covered Wagon	1923	Unknown
Crashing Courage	1923	Unknown
Flames of Passion	1923	Unknown
Scars of Hate	1923	Unknown
Driftwood	1924	Unknown
Shackles of Fear	1924	Unknown
Trail of Vengeance	1924	Unknown
Hills Aflame	1925	Unknown
Peggy of the Secret Service	1925	Unknown
Phantom Shadows	1925	Unknown
Scarlet and Gold	1925	Unknown
The Fighting Chance	1925	Unknown
The Fighting Romeo	1925	Unknown
Vanishing Horse	1925	Unknown
Forbidden Traffic	1927	Unknown
The Big Trail	1930	Unknown
Big Timber	1937	Unknown
Running Wild	1938	Unknown
The Character	1961	Unknown
Adventure West	1962	Unknown
Bad Trip	1988	Unknown

== See also ==
- Oregon Film Trail
