= Powerslide =

Powerslide may refer to:

- Powerslide (inline skating), a braking technique
- Powerslide (video game), a 1998 racing game
- Powerslide, in drifting, a throttle-on induced oversteer
- Power Slide (film), 1990 American film

== See also ==
- Lift-off oversteer
- Understeer and oversteer
