= Power Slide (film) =

1990 film by Steve Lustgarten

- Directed by: Steve Lustgarden
- Written by: Steve Lustgarten
- Produced by: Steve Lustgarten
- Starring: Tim Vandeberghe; John Durbin; Karen Coover; Hughston Walkinshaw
- Cinematography: Dwight Lay
- Edited by: Richard Robbins
- Music by: Rachel Berlin
- Production company: Lustgarden Entertainment Organization
- Distributed by: Filmtown International
- Release date: 1990
- Running time: 96 minutes
- Country: United States
- Language: English
- Budget: $100,000

Power Slide is a 1990 American independent action drama film written and directed by Steve Lustgarden and stars Tim Vandeberghe, John Durbin, Karen Coover, and Hughston Walkinshaw.

The film follows a race car driver (Vandeberghe) who returns to his hometown in rural Nebraska after 10 years, only to discover it is under the control of a drug lord who is extorting local farmers to grow marijuana for him in exchange of their loan debt being paid off.

== Cast ==
- Tim Vandeberghe as Kyle Lockwood
- John Durbin as Gene Lynch
- Karen Coover as Julie Parker
- Hughston Walkinshaw as Aaron Lockwood

== Production ==
Following the success at the Student Academy Awards for his 1983 Portland State University student film American Taboo, Steve Lustgarden sought to write an action film with "more of a story than a lot of action films," referring to most of those films as boring. He originally titled the project Home Fires Burning.

Filming took place on location in the cities of Plattsmouth and Omaha in Nebraska and in Glenwood and Missouri in Iowa during the fall of 1989.

== Release ==
The film was released direct-to-video in Europe by Filmtown International and domestically in the United States by Lustgarden's own company LEO Home Video.
