= The Fisherman's Bride =

- Directed by: Francis Boggs
- Production company: Selig Polyscope Company
- Release date: November 15, 1909
- Running time: 1 reel
- Country: United States
- Language: Silent (English intertitles)

The Fisherman's Bride is a 1909 American silent film directed by Francis Boggs. It was the first commercial film made in the U.S. state of Oregon that had a plot.

== Plot ==
According to a contemporary film magazine, "In close proximity to the quickly improving little city of Astoria, Oregon, noted for its fisheries, there lives old Skipper Stout and his daughter, Jennie. An old acquaintance, Jed Pronty, is anxious to form an alliance between his son, Hiram, and Jennie, the latter really being in love with John Todd, a fisher lad. Skipper Stout favors Hiram's suit, because of the apparent prosperity his energies have yielded him and consents to the match. This agreed upon and seeing his daughter talking to John down on the beach, he and the two Prontys join them, only to find Jennie in the arms of John, a willing subject of John's honest pleading that she become his wife. With this condition of affairs confronting him, old Stout informs Todd of the betrothal he has just acquiesced in between his daughter and Hiram. Thereupon, Jennie, thus placed in a dilemma wherein she must choose, openly avows her love for Todd.

The natural outcome is hasty words, bred of quickened tempers, and after a lively quarrel, and the wrenching of muscle against muscle, John hurries his sweetheart into a fishing-yawl near by and pulls out into the sound. Down this body of water he rows with long, steady strokes, and landing near his mother's cottage, explains matters to her, beseeching her to give shelter and comfort to his future wife. A week later we find the young couple married, much to the chagrin of Hiram, whose father shares in his dismay. They then determine to revenge themselves on the unsuspecting young husband, and form a plot to entice him down to one of the wharf-landings. Hiring a ne'er-do-well deck hand, they send a note to John, signed by one unknown to him, informing him of a purchaser for a boat he has been desirous of selling. He bids his mother and wife good-by, but the latter, apprehensive of all concerning her husband, follows behind him. Arriving at the wharf, he is engaged in conversation by the supposed buyer, and while thus engrossed, is beset by Hiram, his father and others. A coat is thrown deftly over his head, and after a fierce struggle for freedom, he is thrown aboard an awaiting tugboat, which immediately puts out into the sound."

== Production ==
The Fisherman's Bride was shot in Astoria, Oregon at the mouth of the Columbia River, in August 1909. A 1909 newspaper article denotes the film as consisting of 1,000 feet (300 m) worth of reels.
