= Who's on Top? =

- Film poster
- Directed by: Devin Fei-Fan Tau
- Written by: Margaret Lily Andres; Devin Fei-Fan Tau
- Produced by: Devin Fei-Fan Tau, p.g.a.
- Starring: Taylor Feldman; Shanita King; Stacey Rice; Ryan Stee
- Narrated by: George Takei
- Cinematography: Justin Rapp
- Edited by: Margaret Lily Andres
- Production company: No Sunrise Wasted
- Release date: 2020
- Running time: 77 minutes
- Country: United States
- Language: English

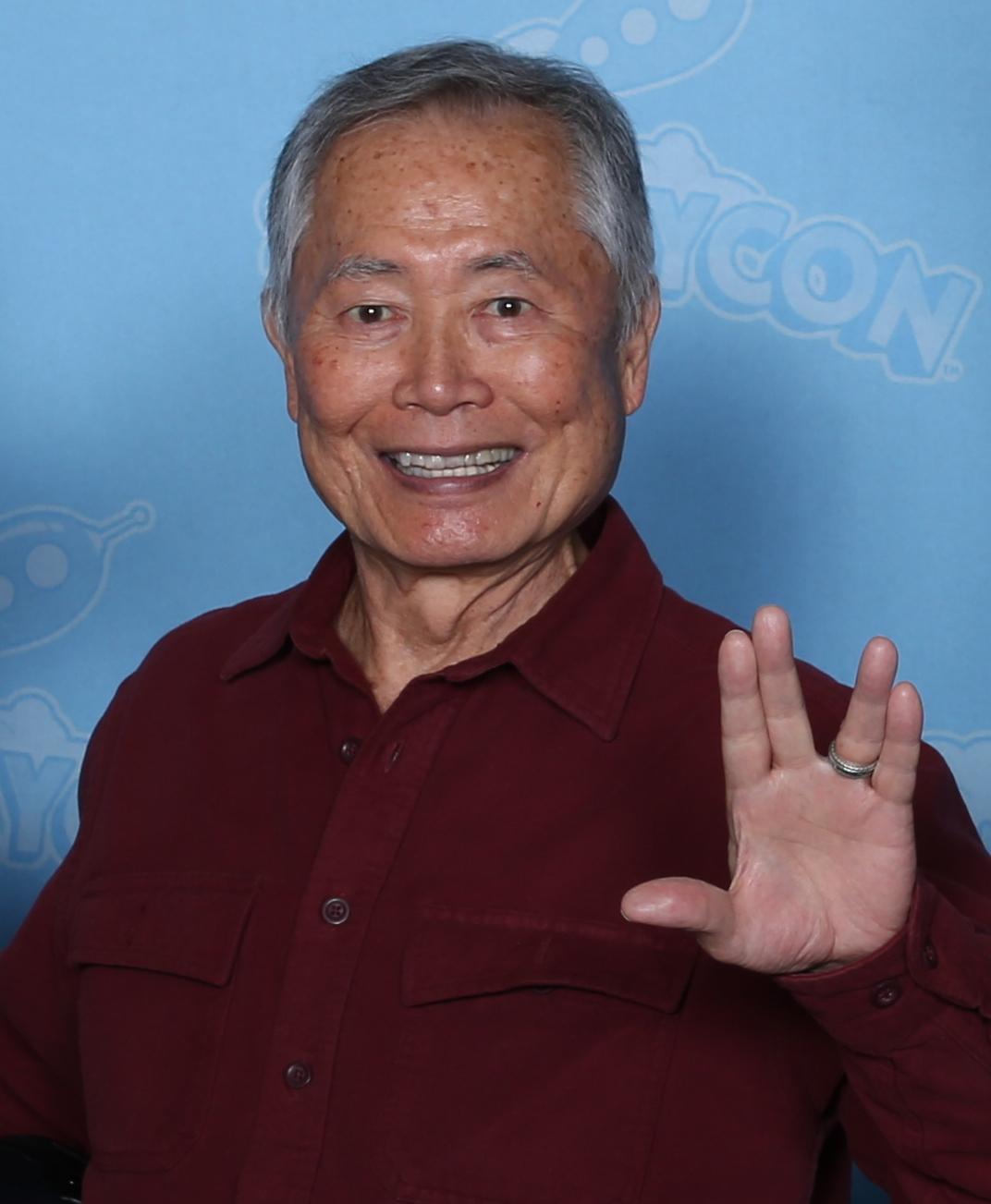
The film is narrated by George Takei (pictured in 2019).

Who's on Top? is the debut documentary directed by Taiwanese American filmmaker Devin Fei-Fan Tau about four queer athletes who climb Mount Hood, in the U.S. state of Oregon. The 2020 film is narrated by George Takei.

== Release ==
Who's on Top? was shown during the Northwest Film Center's 2021 Portland International Film Festival.

The film was made available on multiple streaming services on May 18, 2021, the 41st anniversary of the eruption of Mount St. Helens.

== Reception ==
Janey Wong of the Portland Mercury wrote, “The documentary triumphantly challenges the stereotypes and archetypes of mountaineers and adventurers, seeking to carve out a safe space for people of all genders and sexualities... Crisply shot, the film is a love letter to Oregonians and alpine enthusiasts... Who's on Top? is a feel-good watch for anyone needing a little inspiration to get into gear in order to reach their own summit, whatever it may be.”
