= Oregon Film Museum =

Historic building

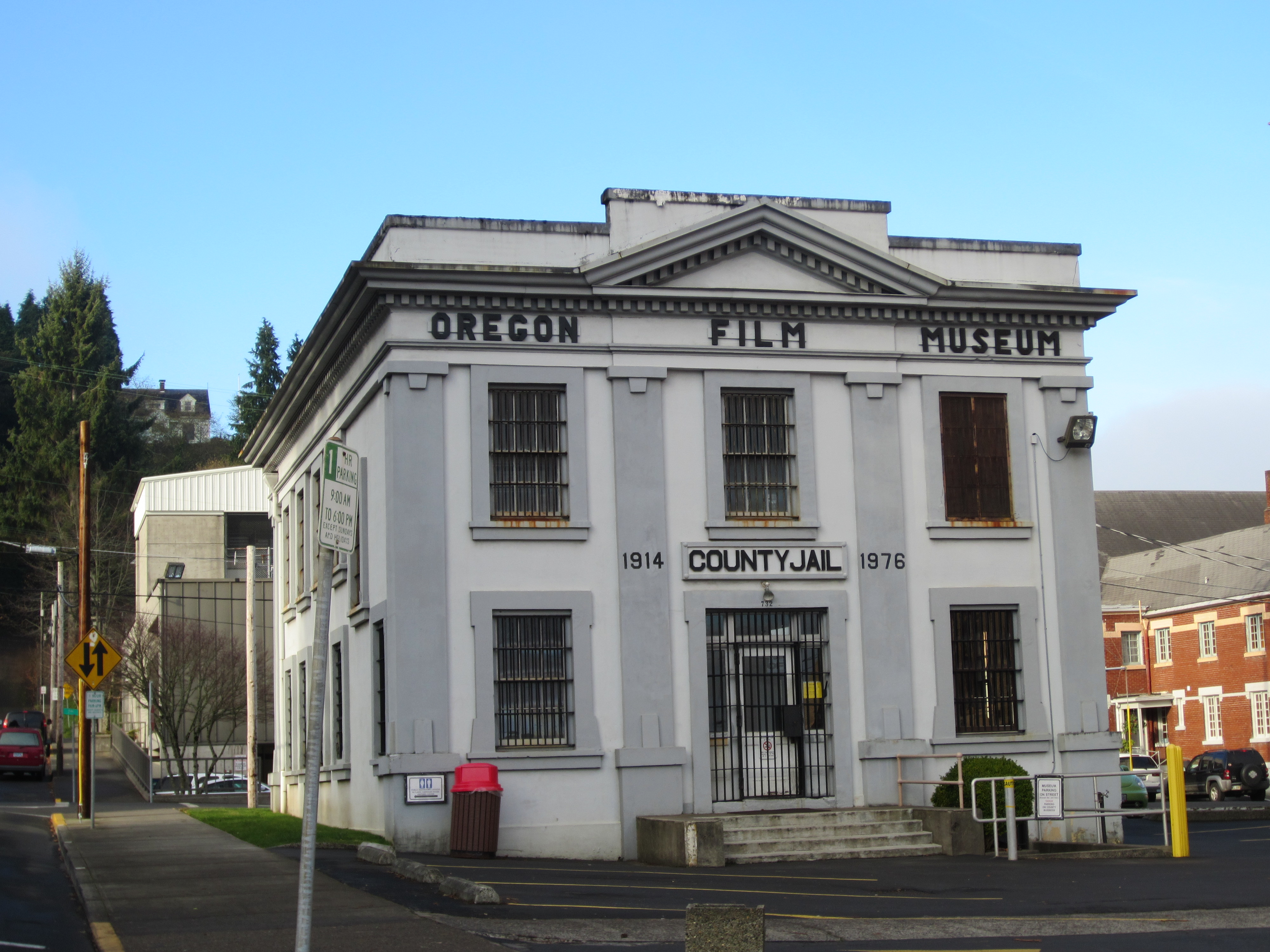
- Established: 2010
- Location: 732 Duane Street, Astoria, Oregon
- Website: www.oregonfilmmuseum.com
- Old Clatsop County Jail
- U.S. National Register of Historic Places
- U.S. Historic district – Contributing property
- Coordinates: 46°11′19″N 123°50′08″W
- Built: 1913
- Part of: Astoria Downtown Historic District (ID98000631)
- NRHP reference No.: 83002145
- Added to NRHP: May 19, 1983

The Oregon Film Museum is a museum highlighting and celebrating movies that were made in the U.S. state of Oregon. The museum is housed in the old Clatsop County Jail in Astoria, Oregon, which is on the National Register of Historic Places. The building was used in the opening chase sequence of the 1985 film The Goonies. The museum opened in 2010, coinciding with the 25th anniversary of the film.

The museum features hands-on exhibits related to films that were made in Oregon, which include, in addition to The Goonies, Kindergarten Cop, Free Willy, Twilight, The Shining, Sometimes a Great Notion and National Lampoon's Animal House. It contains several props from The Goonies, in addition to memorabilia, costumes and various collectibles that are on display within the former jail cells. Visitors can also create their own short films in an exhibit that features small sets and green screens. As of 2015, an "ORV" similar to the one used by the Fratelli gang in The Goonies can be found in the parking lot complete with imitation bullet holes near the rear license plate.

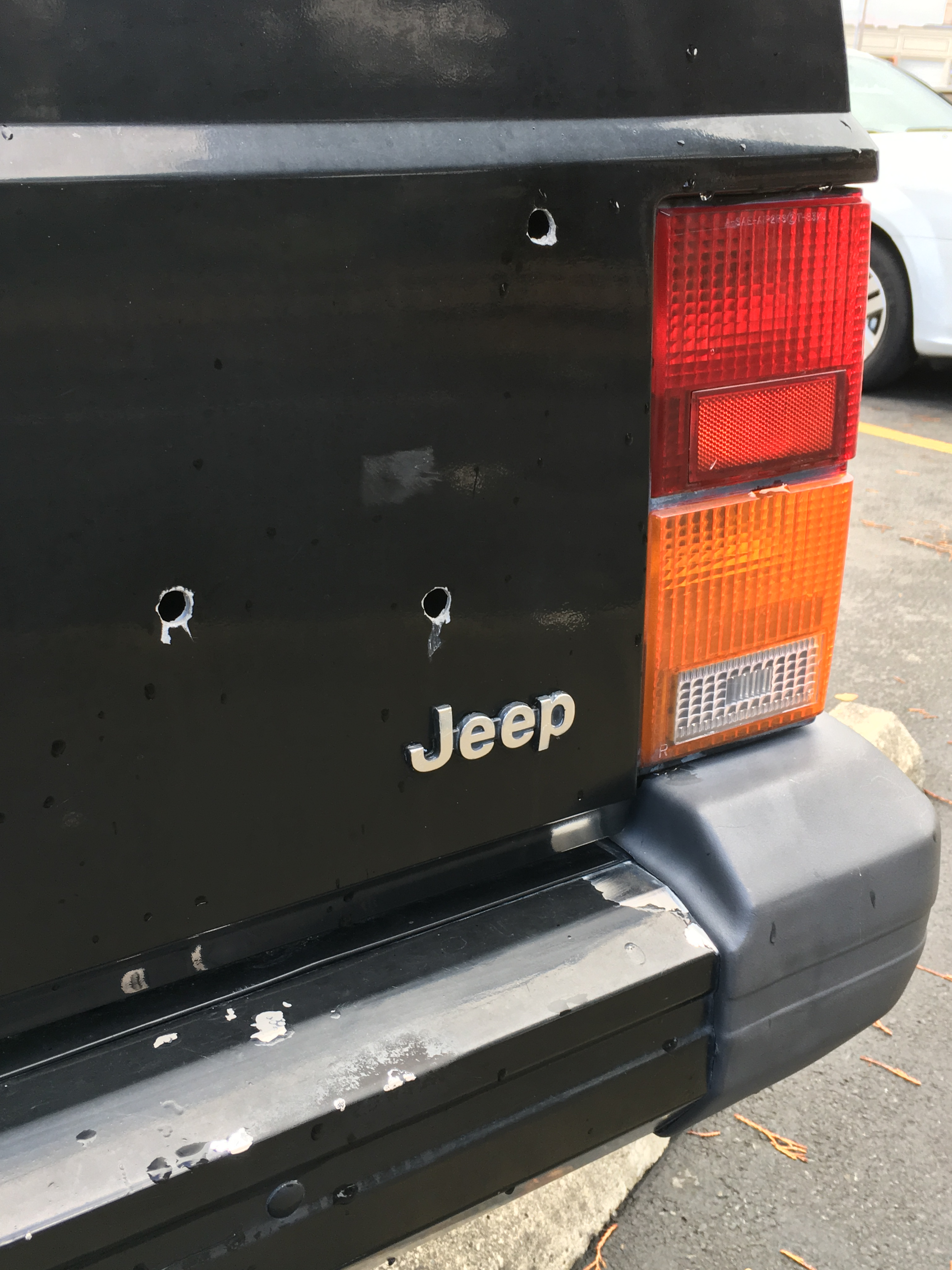
The imitation bullet holes in the ORV parked outside of the museum.

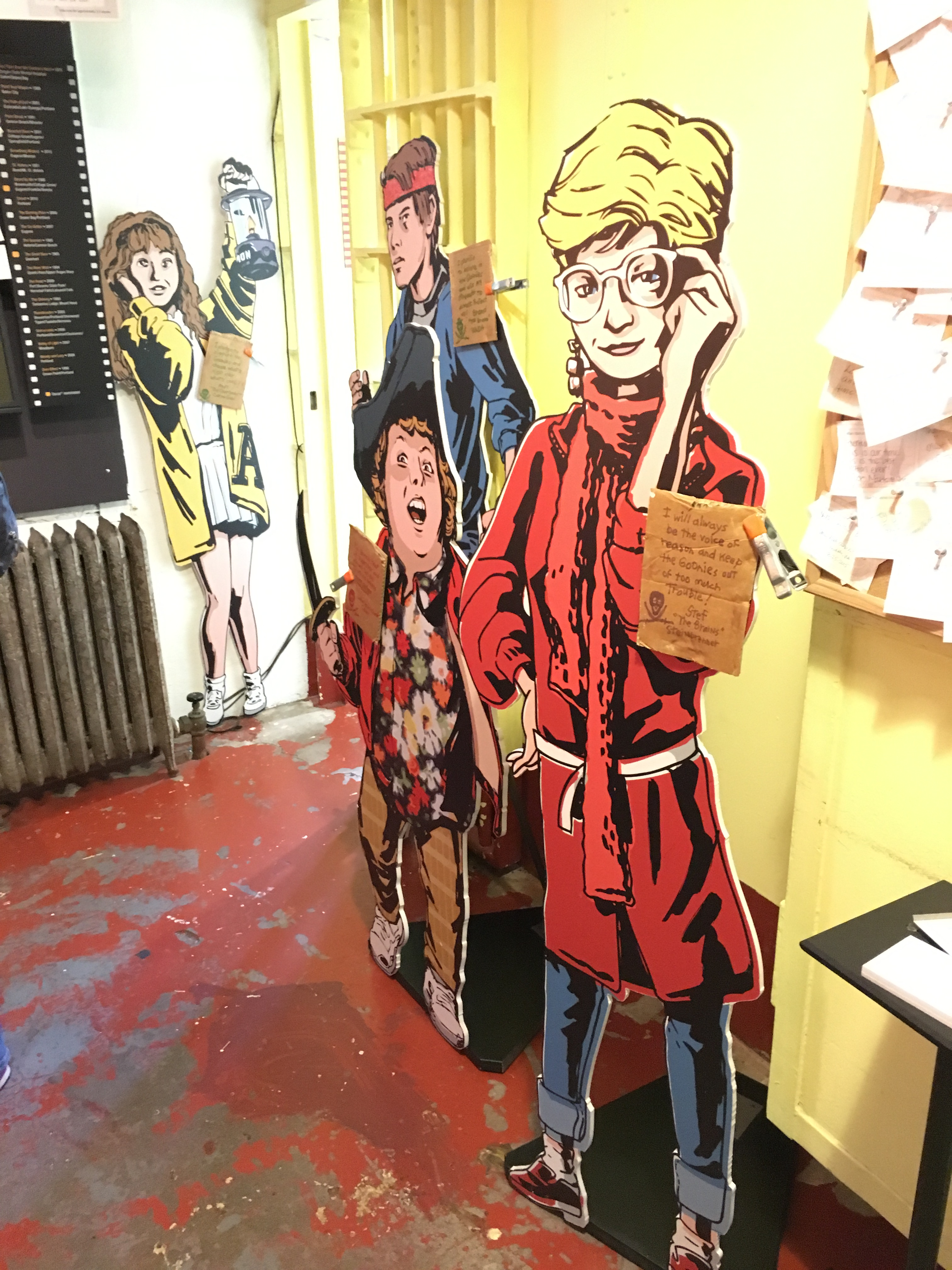
Museum displays.

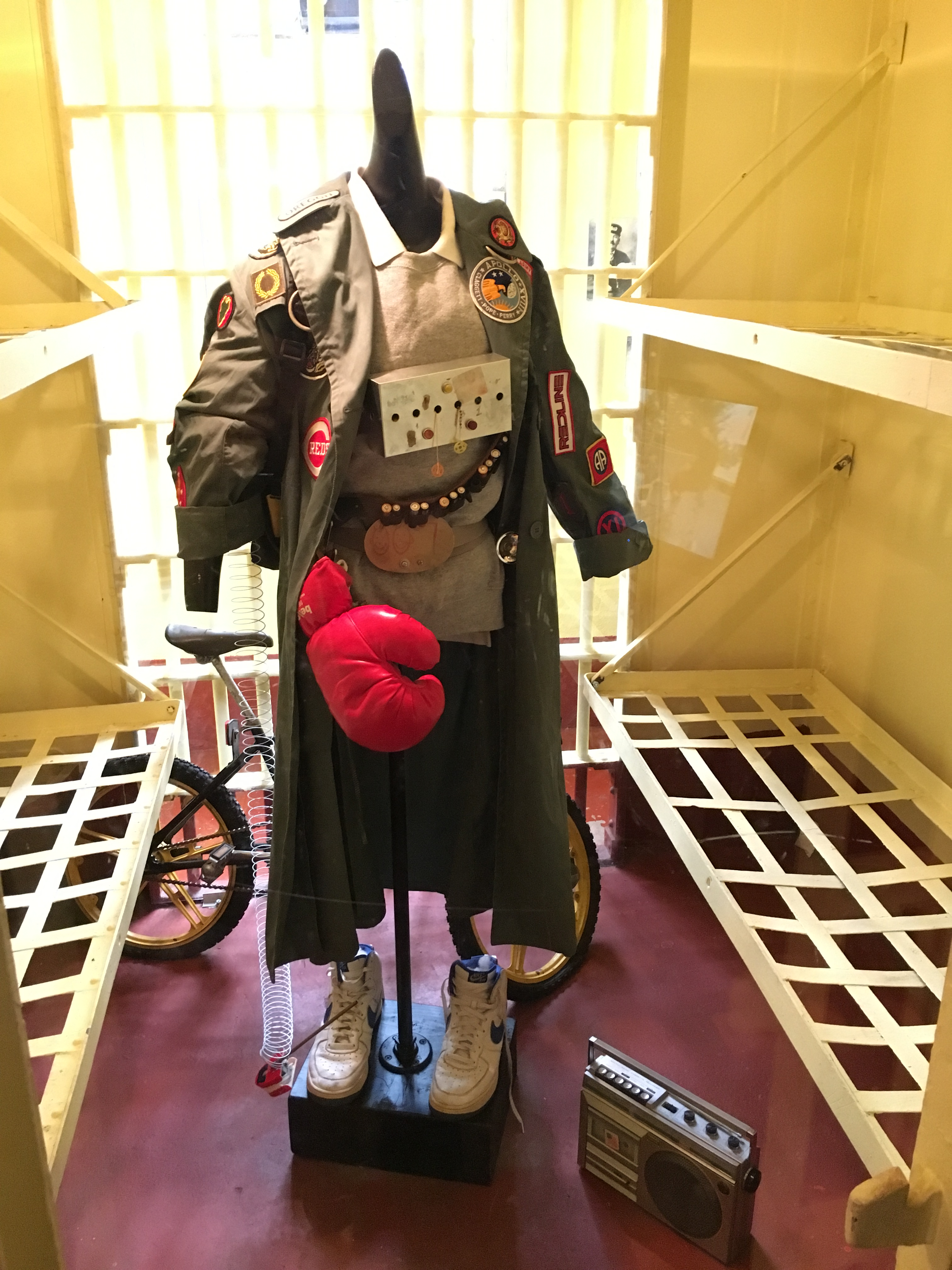
Data's costume.

== See also ==
- List of films shot in Oregon
- Oregon Film Trail
