= American Taboo =

- Artwork for 1991 revival screening
- Directed by: Steve Lustgarten
- Written by: Nicole Harrison; Jay Horenstein; Steve Lustgarten
- Produced by: Sali Borchman; Steve Lustgarten; Ron Schmidt
- Starring: Jay Horenstein; Nicole Harrison
- Cinematography: Eric Alan Edwards; Steve Lustgarten; Lee Nesbit; Mark Whitney
- Edited by: Steve Lustgarten; Ron Schmidt
- Release dates: April 16, 1983 (Minneapolis); July 5, 1991 (American Film Institute)
- Running time: 94 minutes
- Country: United States
- Language: English
- Budget: $20,000

American Taboo is a 1983 American independent drama film directed by Steve Lustgarten. Its plot follows a thirty-something year old photographer who begins an illicit romance with a teenage girl. It won the 1983 Academy Award for Best Student Film for Lustgarten, a film student at Portland State University.

== Cast ==
- Jay Horenstein as Paul Wunderlich
- Nicole Harrison as Lisa Welch
- Hester Schell as Betsy
- Mark Rabiner as Michael

== Production ==
The film was shot on location in Portland, Oregon on a budget of $20,000. The feature was a student film by Steve Lustgarten, a film student at Portland State University.

== Release ==
=== Theatrical distribution ===
The film screened in Minneapolis in 1983 in the Film in the Cities' Gallery. It had a revival screening at the American Film Institute eight years later, in July 1991.

=== Critical response ===
Kevin Thomas of the Los Angeles Times wrote that the film "has a rich visual elegance. The portrayals Lustgarten elicits from Horenstein and Harrison are amazingly persuasive, especially in the case of Harrison, who keeps us guessing throughout as to whether Lisa really is as sophisticated as she would like us to think she is." LA Weekly also praised the film, noting that Lustgarten "tiptoes around every cliché attached to older-man/young-girl and owl-and-pussycat types of films, creating a refreshing guide to bruised emotions and the insurgent power of love."

==== Accolades ====
| Institution | Category | Recipient | Result | Ref. |
|---|---|---|---|---|
| Student Academy Awards | Best Film — Drama | Steve Lustgarten | Won | |
