= Glenesslin =

Glenesslin may refer to:

- Glenesslin farmhouse, Dunscore, Scotland, United Kingdom
- Glenesslin shipwreck, Oregon, United States
