= List of shipwrecks in 1983 =

The list of shipwrecks in 1983 includes ships sunk, foundered, grounded, or otherwise lost during 1983.

table of contents
1983
Jan	Feb	Mar	Apr
May	Jun	Jul	Aug
Sep	Oct	Nov	Dec
Unknown date

== January ==
=== 1 January ===
List of shipwrecks: 1 January 1983
Ship	State	Description
Fantasea	United States	The fishing vessel sank in Constantine Harbor on the coast of Amchitka Island in the Aleutian Islands.
Marty N	United States	The fishing vessel was abandoned after she caught fire in Prince William Sound west of Glacier Island (60°53′N 147°11′W) on the south-central coast of Alaska. Her crew survived.

=== 15 January ===
List of shipwrecks: 5 January 1983
Ship	State	Description
Kathy Joanne	United States	The fishing vessel lost power, broached in heavy surf, and was blown ashore at Badger Point (59°13′N 151°32′W) on the southern tip of the Kenai Peninsula on the south-central coast of Alaska.

=== 19 January ===
List of shipwrecks: 19 January 1983
Ship	State	Description
Hamzi	Syria	The coaster was discovered ashore and abandoned at Gölovası, Turkey. She was refloated and subsequently disposed of by the port authority there.

=== 22 January ===
List of shipwrecks: 22 January 1983
Ship	State	Description
"Ideal"	United Kingdom	The 38-foot (12 m) fishing vessel struck the Wyre Light in dense fog and sank. Crew rescued by "Naiomi Uinsionn" (United Kingdom). Masts and top of gantry removed, salvage attempts abandoned.

=== 25 January ===
List of shipwrecks: 25 January 1983
Ship	State	Description
White Gull	United States	The fishing vessel disappeared in the Gulf of Alaska somewhere between Pelican and Yakutat, Alaska, with the loss of all three people on board.

=== 30 January ===
List of shipwrecks: 30 January 1983
Ship	State	Description
Ivanof II	United States	The fishing vessel was wrecked on Little Koniuji Island (55°00′N 159°23′W) in the Shumagin Islands in Alaska.

== February ==
=== 5 February ===
List of shipwrecks: 5 February 1983
Ship	State	Description
John Jason	United States	The crab-fishing vessel sank in Knight Island Passage (60°15′N 148°00′W) in Prince William Sound on the south-central coast of Alaska.

=== 12 February ===
List of shipwrecks: 12 February 1983
Ship	State	Description
Marine Electric	United States	The bulk carrier sank in the North Atlantic Ocean about 30 nautical miles (56 km; 35 mi) off Virginia with the loss of 31 lives.

=== 14 February ===
List of shipwrecks: 14 February 1983
Ship	State	Description
Altair	United States	The 190-gross ton, 123.5-foot (37.6 m) fishing vessel disappeared in the Bering Sea during a voyage from Dutch Harbor, Alaska, to the Pribilof Islands. The bodies of her seven crewmen were never found.
Americus	United States	The 194-gross ton, 111-foot (33.8 m) or 123.5-foot (37.6 m) fishing vessel capsizeed with the loss of all hands in the Bering Sea during a voyage from Dutch Harbor, Alaska, to the Pribilof Islands. The bodies of her seven crewmen were never found. Her overturned hull sank in 4,000 feet (1,200 m) of water on 16 February.

=== 16 February ===
List of shipwrecks: 16 February 1983
Ship	State	Description
Danielle	United States	The vessel was wrecked on rocks near Shuyak Island in Alaska′s Kodiak Archipelago.

=== 23 February ===
List of shipwrecks: 23 February 1983
Ship	State	Description
Pará	Brazilian Navy	The decommissioned Gearing-class destroyer was sunk as a target in the Atlantic Ocean off the coast of Brazil 80 nautical miles (150 km; 92 mi) south of Cabo Frio lighthouse by two torpedoes fired by the submarine Ceará (Brazilian Navy).

=== 24 February ===
List of shipwrecks: 24 February 1983
Ship	State	Description
HMS Nurton	Royal Navy	The Ton-class minesweeper collided with HMS Brocklesby (Royal Navy) and was holed. She was abandoned by her crew. Subsequently repaired and returned to service.

=== 27 February ===
List of shipwrecks: 27 February 1983
Ship	State	Description
Fly Boy (or Flyboy)	United States	The 56-foot (17.1 m) crab-fishing vessel capsized and sank off Lava Point (54°10′20″N 166°04′45″W) on Akutan Island in the Aleutian Islands. Her captain died while trying to right her before she sank. Her other two crewmen survived.

== March ==
=== 10 March ===
List of shipwrecks: 10 March 1983
Ship	State	Description
Tammy	United States	The 52-foot (15.8 m) fishing vessel burned and sank in the Gulf of Alaska near Noisy Island off the west coast of Kodiak Island. The three-man crew abandoned ship in a life raft and were rescued by the fishing vessel Moonbeam (United States).

=== 11 March ===
List of shipwrecks: 11 March 1983
Ship	State	Description
Arctic Dreamer	United States	The 195-ton, 81-foot (24.7 m) fishing vessel capsized and sank in bad weather in the Bering Sea approximately 10 nautical miles (19 km; 12 mi) north of Dutch Harbor, Alaska. The fishing vessel Starlight (United States) rescued her crew of six.

=== 12 March ===
List of shipwrecks: 12 March 1983
Ship	State	Description
Sea Hawk	United States	The 66-foot (20.1 m) crab-fishing vessel sank in Inanudak Bay (53°18′N 168°25′W) on the coast of Umnak Island in the Aleutian Islands after her automatic steering system locked and forced her into a tight turn that caused her to capsize. The vessel's cook, who was the only woman aboard, died; the high endurance cutter USCGC Boutwell ( United States Coast Guard) rescued the vessel′s five male crew members.

=== 13 March ===
List of shipwrecks: 13 March 1983
Ship	State	Description
Equinox	United States	The crab-fishing vessel capsized and sank in Lynn Canal in Southeast Alaska 2 nautical miles (3.7 km; 2.3 mi) east of Haines, Alaska.

=== 15 March ===
List of shipwrecks: 15 March 1983
Ship	State	Description
Cinderella	United States	The retired 70-foot (21.3 m) fishing trawler was scuttled as an artificial reef in the North Atlantic Ocean off Sea Girt, New Jersey, at 40°06.777′N 073°56.860′W.

=== 31 March ===
List of shipwrecks: 31 March 1983
Ship	State	Description
Indus 17	Chile	The whaler was scuttled off San Vicente de Tagua Tagua (36°43′S 75°07′W).

=== Unknown date ===
List of shipwrecks: Unknown date 1983
Ship	State	Description
USS William M. Wood	United States Navy	The decommissioned Gearing-class destroyer was sunk as a target off Puerto Rico.

== April ==
=== 1 April ===
List of shipwrecks: 1 April 1983
Ship	State	Description
Cohoe	United States	The halibut schooner sank in heavy weather approximately 20 nautical miles (37 km; 23 mi) northwest of Kayak Island on the south-central coast of Alaska.

=== 3 April ===
List of shipwrecks: 3 April 1983
Ship	State	Description
Koho	United States	The 70-foot (21.3 m) sailboat capsized and sank in the Gulf of Alaska 2 nautical miles (3.7 km; 2.3 mi) south of Kayak Island on the south-central coast of Alaska when her crab pots shifted after a large wave struck her. Her three crewmen and five other men aboard Koho to assist her crew – two crewmen from the fishing vessel Arrow (United States) and three members of the crew of the buoy tender USCGC Sweetbriar ( United States Coast Guard) – survived.

=== 4 April ===
List of shipwrecks: 4 April 1983
Ship	State	Description
Lou Ann (or Lou Anne)	United States	While towing the barge Sherry Lee (United States) from Dutch Harbor, Alaska, to Seattle, Washington with a stop at Anchorage, Alaska, the tug sank in a storm in the Gulf of Alaska with the loss of her entire crew of five during the Anchorage-Seattle leg of the voyage approximately 145 nautical miles (269 km; 167 mi) southeast of Cordova, Alaska. Sherry Lee was found beached on 6 April.

=== 6 April ===
List of shipwrecks: 6 April 1983
Ship	State	Description
Sherry Lee	United States	The unmanned barge was found beached on the south-central coast of Alaska approximately 12 nautical miles (22 km; 14 mi) southeast of Cape Suckling (59.9897°N 143.8833°W). She had been under tow by the tug Lou Ann (United States) from Dutch Harbor, Alaska, to Seattle, Washington with a stop at Anchorage, Alaska, when Lou Ann sank with the loss of all hands in a storm in the Gulf of Alaska on 4 April during the Anchorage-Seattle leg of the voyage.
Transport	Norway	The cargo ship was scuttled off Harstad.

=== 10 April ===
List of shipwrecks: 10 April 1983
Ship	State	Description
Kawan	Malaysia	The Design 381 cargo ship foundered.

=== 11 April ===
List of shipwrecks: 11 April 1983
Ship	State	Description
Bay Club	Panama	Suffered an engine room fire 1,000 nautical miles (1,900 km; 1,200 mi) off Land's End, Cornwall, United Kingdom. The crew abandoned ship and were rescued by Dart Atlantic (United Kingdom).
Helen Jean	United States	During a voyage from Wrangel to Valdez, Alaska, the fishing vessel sank in the Gulf of Alaska. A United States Coast Guard helicopter rescued the two men on board.
Schutting 1	Panama	The vessel foundered 75 nautical miles (139 km; 86 mi) south west of Land's End. Six crew were taken off by helicopter from RNAS Culdrose, Cornwall. The seven remaining crew later took to a lifeboat and were rescued by Axel Johnson. They were also taken to Culdrose by helicopter.

=== 12 April ===
List of shipwrecks: 12 April 1983
Ship	State	Description
Unknown missile boat	Iraqi Navy	Iran–Iraq War: The Project 205 missile boat was sunk by a missile (possibly a Harpoon missile) from an Iranian warship.

=== 14 April ===
List of shipwrecks: 14 April 1983
Ship	State	Description
USS Vesole	United States Navy	The decommissioned Gearing-class destroyer was sunk as a target off Puerto Rico.

=== 16 April ===
List of shipwrecks: 16 April 1983
Ship	State	Description
Aloha	United States	The longline fishing vessel struck a rock and sank with the loss of three lives near Crawfish Inlet (56°45′N 135°12′W) in the Necker Islands (56.8242°N 135.4553°W) in Southeast Alaska south of Sitka, Alaska. There were three survivors.

=== 19 April ===
List of shipwrecks: 19 April 1983
Ship	State	Description
Ghiannis D	Greece	Ran aground at Sha`b Abu Nuhas reef. Remained stranded on reef and sank some six weeks later.

=== 20 April ===
List of shipwrecks: 20 April 1983
Ship	State	Description
Natalia Jade	United States	The crab-fishing vessel burned and sank in the Shelikof Strait west of Raspberry Island in the Kodiak Archipelago.

=== 23 April ===
List of shipwrecks: 23 April 1983
Ship	State	Description
TID 172	United Kingdom	The TID-class tug was damaged by an onboard explosion at Ipswich, Suffolk. Subsequently repaired.

=== 28 April ===
List of shipwrecks: 28 April 1983
Ship	State	Description
Longliner	United States	The crab-fishing vessel sank in the Bering Sea 7 nautical miles (13 km; 8.1 mi) northwest of Cape Ideluk (52°08′30″N 173°31′45″W) on Amlia Island in the Aleutian Islands.

=== Unknown date ===
List of shipwrecks: unknown date April 1983
Ship	State	Description
Misty Blue	United States	The fishing trawler departed for a clamming trip on 11 April 1983 and was scheduled to return the following day, but never did. Her entire crew of four was lost. Her intact wreck was found on the bottom of the Atlantic Ocean east of Cape Henlopen, Delaware.

== May ==
=== 2 May ===
List of shipwrecks: 2 May 1983
Ship	State	Description
Unidentified missile boat	Iraqi Navy	Iran–Iraq War: The Project 205 (NATO reporting name Osa-class) missile boat was sunk by a Harpoon missile fired by an Islamic Republic of Iran warship. Twelve of her crewmen were rescued by an Islamic Republic of Iran Navy Aviation Sikorsky SH-3 Sea King helicopter and made prisoners-of-war.

=== 6 May ===
List of shipwrecks: 6 May 1983
Ship	State	Description
Larisa	United States	The crab-fishing vessel burned and sank in the Bering Sea north of Unimak Island in the Aleutian Islands.

=== 9 May ===
List of shipwrecks: 9 May 1983
Ship	State	Description
"Princess Royal"	South Africa	The 139.4-foot (42.5 m) stripped, out of service, fishing vessel was scuttled off Robben Island, South Africa.

=== 16 May ===
List of shipwrecks: 16 May 1983
Ship	State	Description
Noreen Ann	United States	The fishing trawler sank 5 nautical miles (9.3 km; 5.8 mi) west of Cape Lookout (55°06′N 133°14′W) near Dall Island in the Alexander Archipelago in Southeast Alaska.

=== 30 May ===
List of shipwrecks: 30 May 1983
Ship	State	Description
Girdwood Ranger	United States	The sailboat sank in bad weather south of Cordova, Alaska.

== June ==
=== 3 June ===
List of shipwrecks: 3 June 1983
Ship	State	Description
USS Bushnell	United States Navy	The decommissioned Fulton-class submarine tender was sunk as a torpedo target by the submarine USS Atlanta (United States Navy) in the Atlantic Ocean at 35°34′42″N 073°18′36″W.

=== 5 June ===
List of shipwrecks: 5 June 1983
Ship	State	Description
Alexander Suvorov	Soviet Union	The excursion/cruise ship collided with a railway bridge at Ulyanovsk, killing 177 people. Ship later repaired and returned to service.

=== 23 June ===
List of shipwrecks: 23 June 1983
Ship	State	Description
K-429	Soviet Navy	Sank off Petropavlovsk-Kamchatsky with the loss of 16 lives. Later salvaged and returned to service.

=== 27 June ===
List of shipwrecks: 27 June 1983
Ship	State	Description
"Princess Elizebeth"	South Africa	The 137.16-foot (41.81 m) stripped, out of service, fishing vessel was scuttled in Smitswinkel Bay, False Bay, South Africa.

=== 29 June ===
List of shipwrecks: 29 June 1983
Ship	State	Description
Spearfish	United Kingdom	The supply vessel collided with the rig Penrod 83 in the English Channel and was holed. All six crew rescued by a helicopter from RNAS Lee-on-Solent. Spearfish later sunk by HMS Tartar (Royal Navy) as she was deemed to be a hazard to shipping.

=== Unknown date ===
List of shipwrecks: Unknown date June 1983
Ship	State	Description
Kiley B	United States	The retired 75-foot (22.9 m) fishing trawler was scuttled as an artificial reef in the North Atlantic Ocean off Sea Girt, New Jersey, in 70 feet (21 m) of water at 40°06.540′N 073°56.827′W.

== July ==
=== Unknown date ===
List of shipwrecks: Unknown date 1983
Ship	State	Description
Dykes	United States	The retired 306-foot (93.3 m) schooner barge was scuttled as an artificial reef in the North Atlantic Ocean off Sea Girt, New Jersey, in 65 feet (20 m) of water at 40°06.964′N 073°57.571′W. Her wreck is nicknamed "the Steel Schooner."
Hurricane	United States	The 19-foot (5.8 m) catamaran disappeared in the Pacific Ocean during a voyage from Long Beach, California, to Honolulu, Hawaii, presumably a casualty of Tropical Storm Gil.

== August ==
=== 2 August ===
List of shipwrecks: 2 August 1983
Ship	State	Description
Ethel D	United States	A fire broke out in the engine room of the 60-foot (18.3 m) crab-fishing vessel off Kodiak Island in Alaska. A United States Coast Guard Sikorsky HH-52 Seaguard helicopter rescued her crew. According to conflicting reports, she either sank east of Kodiak 1 nautical mile (1.9 km; 1.2 mi) off Cape Chiniak (57°37′N 152°10′W) or was towed to dry dock.

=== 6 August ===
List of shipwrecks: 5 August 1983
Ship	State	Description
Castillo de Bellver	Spain	The tanker broke in two and caught fire off Saldaana, South Africa. The stern section capsized and sank; the bow section was taken in tow by the tug John Ross (South Africa), but was sunk by explosive charges.

=== 10 August ===
List of shipwrecks: 10 August 1983
Ship	State	Description
Neg Chieftain	Panama	The tug capsized and sank off Ramsgate, Kent.

=== 11 August ===
List of shipwrecks: 11 August 1983
Ship	State	Description
Unidentified submarine	Soviet Navy	United States Army Intelligence and Security Command assets intercepted information that allowed the United States to piece together details concerning the sinking of a Soviet submarine in the North Pacific Ocean.

=== 12 August ===
List of shipwrecks: 12 August 1983
Ship	State	Description
Princess Tamara	United States	The 125-foot (38.1 m) fishing vessel burned and sank in the Gulf of Alaska off the south-central coast of Alaska 2 nautical miles (3.7 km; 2.3 mi) west of the Barren Islands (58°57′N 152°15′W). The fishing vessel Caprice (United States) rescued her crew of four.

=== 13 August ===
List of shipwrecks: 13 August 1983
Ship	State	Description
Providence	United States	While most of her crew was asleep, the 50-foot (15.2 m) seiner sank with the loss of three lives while at anchor in Thorne Arm (55°20′30″N 131°38′45″W) in Southeast Alaska 18 nautical miles (33 km; 21 mi) south of Ketchikan, Akaska. There were four survivors.

=== 24 August ===
List of shipwrecks: 24 August 1983
Ship	State	Description
Bernice	United States	The fishing vessel sank of the coast of Southeast Alaska 20 nautical miles (37 km; 23 mi) southeast of Icy Bay and Cape Yakataga (60.0611°N 142.4322°W).

=== 25 August ===
List of shipwrecks: 25 August 1983
Ship	State	Description
Paula Diane	United States	The shrimp-fishing vessel struck a log and sank in the Gulf of Alaska 60 nautical miles (110 km; 69 mi) southwest of Yakutat, Alaska.
Serendipity	United States	The gillnet fishing vessel was destroyed by fire off Port Moller (55°53′N 160°28′W), Alaska, on the Alaska Peninsula.
Showgirl	United States	The fishing vessel was destroyed by fire 10 nautical miles (19 km; 12 mi) off Port Moller (55°53′N 160°28′W), Alaska, on the Alaska Peninsula.

=== 28 August ===
List of shipwrecks: 28 August 1983
Ship	State	Description
Michellinda	United States	The fishing vessel was destroyed by fire outside of Whittier, Alaska.

== September ==
=== 1 September ===
List of shipwrecks: 1 September 1983
Ship	State	Description
Golden Viking	United States	The 86-foot (26.2 m) crab-fishing vessel capsized and sank with the loss of two lives while making a turn in bad weather in the Bering Sea approximately 9 nautical miles (17 km; 10 mi) south of St. Matthew Island. The fishing vessel Tiffany (United States) rescued her four survivors from a life raft.

=== 4 September ===
List of shipwrecks: 4 September 1983
Ship	State	Description
Christina Marie	United States	The 29-foot (8.8 m) fishing vessel was wrecked with the loss of one life at Humpy Point (54°49′15″N 130°56′30″W) in Dixon Entrance in Southeast Alaska south of Katchikan, Alaska.
Parks No. 15	United States	The fishing vessel capsized in Shelikof Strait near Miners Point (57°54′00″N 153°43′20″W) on the west coast of Kodiak Island with the loss of one life. A United States Coast Guard helicopter rescued the other four people on board.

=== 5 September ===
List of shipwrecks: 5 September 1983
Ship	State	Description
Darline C	United States	The seiner was destroyed by a fire that began in her engine room, reportedly off Old Harbor, Alaska.
Sacco	United States	The 84-gross ton, 110.2-foot (33.6 m) barge sank off Ocean Cape (59°32′30″N 139°51′30″W) on the south-central coast of Alaska.

=== 10 September ===
List of shipwrecks: 10 September 1983
Ship	State	Description
Pan Nova	South Korea	The cargo ship collided with another cargo ship in the Bering Sea northeast of Dutch Harbor, Alaska, near Unimak Pass and eventually sank north of Akun Island in the Fox Islands subgroup of the Aleutian Islands.

=== 12 September ===
List of shipwrecks: 12 September 1983
Ship	State	Description
Margaret Christine	United Kingdom	The 162-foot (49 m), 137-ton trawler sank in the North Sea. Later raised and scrapped.

=== 23 September ===
List of shipwrecks: 23 September 1983
Ship	State	Description
Endeavor	United States	The 92-foot (28.0 m) crab-fishing vessel capsized and sank approximately 25 nautical miles (46 km; 29 mi) northeast of Sand Point, Alaska, in the Shumagin Islands. Her entire crew of three perished.

=== 25 September ===
List of shipwrecks: 25 September 1983
Ship	State	Description
Comet	United States	The 43-foot (13.1 m) halibut-fishing vessel sank in the Bering Sea approximately 25 nautical miles (46 km; 29 mi) northeast of Dutch Harbor, Alaska, after her engine room flooded. The high endurance cutter USCGC Boutwell ( United States Coast Guard) rescued her crew of four after they had been in the water for only four minutes.

== October ==
=== 3 October ===
List of shipwrecks: 3 October 1983
Ship	State	Description
Kawan	Malaysia	The Design 381 coastal freighter foundered.

=== 3 October ===
List of shipwrecks: 3 October 1983
Ship	State	Description
Kahnamuie	Islamic Republic of Iran Navy	Iran–Iraq War: The Bayandor-class frigate was sunk by AM-39 Exocet missiles fired from an Iraqi Super Frelon helicopter. 19 crewmen were killed.

=== 7 October ===
List of shipwrecks: 7 October 1983
Ship	State	Description
ARA Almirante Domecq Garcia	Argentine Navy	The decommissioned Fletcher-class destroyer was sunk as a target by an MM-38 Exocet missile fired by the corvette ARA Drummond and a torpedo fired by the submarine ARA San Luis (both Argentine Navy).

=== 10 October ===
List of shipwrecks: 10 October 1983
Ship	State	Description
Arne	United States	The 56-foot (17.1 m) longline fishing vessel ran aground on the coast of Alaska′s Kodiak Island just north of Narrow Cape (57°25′30″N 152°20′00″W) and was destroyed by the surf. All on board survived.

=== 26 October ===
List of shipwrecks: 26 October 1983
Ship	State	Description
M&M	United States	The 50-foot (15.2 m) fishing vessel capsized after striking a log near Wrangell, Alaska.

=== 27 October ===
List of shipwrecks: 27 October 1983
Ship	State	Description
Eagle	United States	The 130-foot (39.6 m) tug capsized and sank in heavy seas in the Gulf of Alaska 70 nautical miles (130 km; 81 mi) southeast of Yakutat, Alaska, with the loss of eight lives. A United States Coast Guard helicopter rescued her sole survivor.

=== Unknown date ===
List of shipwrecks: Unknown date 1983
Ship	State	Description
Kolya Myagotin	Soviet Union	The motor vessel was reported to be trapped in ice and sinking in the Chukchi Sea.
Nina Sagaidak	Soviet Union	The motor vessel was trapped in ice in the Chukchi Sea, was crushed, and sank. A helicopter rescued her crew and took it to Vladivostok in the Soviet Union.
Sunnfjord II	Unknown	The passenger ship – a former PCE-842-class patrol craft – sank while under tow from Finland to new owners in Oslo, Norway.

== November ==
=== 6 November ===
List of shipwrecks: 6 November 1983
Ship	State	Description
Unidentified fishing vssel	Nicaragua	Contra War: The fishing vessel was sunk by gunifre by Honduran Navy vessels.
USS Bluegill	United States Navy	Refloated the previous day after use since December 1970 as a submerged rescue trraining hulk, the decommissioned Gato-class submarine was scuttled in deep water in the Pacific Ocean off Hawaii as a means of disposal.

=== 19 November ===
List of shipwrecks: 19 November 1983
Ship	State	Description
Blue Magpie	Panama	The cargo ship was wrecked at the entrance to Yaquina Bay while seeking shelter at Newport, Oregon, during a storm.

=== 21 November ===
List of shipwrecks: 21 November 1983
Ship	State	Description
Antigoni	Greece	Iran–Iraq War: The motor vessel was hit by an air-launched guided missile and sunk. All nineteen crew survived.
Dai Lung	Taiwan	Taiwanese Dai Lung sinking in the South China Sea. The ship started taking on water in the No.1 cargo hold in rough seas of the Typhoon Orchid in the South China Sea. The crew was unable to find the source of the leak and sent an SOS. The frigate USS Kirk (United States Navy) was nearby and rescued 23 of 25 crewmembers. Two crewmembers had died before rescue.

=== 23 November ===
List of shipwrecks: 23 November 1983
Ship	State	Description
Diana D.	Lebanon	The vessel was sunk in a collision with USS Fort Snelling (United States Navy), which was part of multinational peacekeeping operations following the 1981 ceasefire during the Lebanese Civil War.

=== 26 November ===
List of shipwrecks: 26 November 1983
Ship	State	Description
PNCO Baslian	Philippines	The tanker exploded, caught fire and sank off Luzon.

== December ==
=== 3 December ===
List of shipwrecks: 3 December 1983
Ship	State	Description
Spirit	United States	The crab-fishing vessel was discovered submerged near Pleasant Island in Southeast Alaska near Gustavus, Alaska. Her two-person crew was lost.

=== 3 December ===
List of shipwrecks: 3 December 1983
Ship	State	Description
Condor	United States	The 70-foot (21.3 m) tug burned and sank in 70 feet (21 m) of water in Long Island Sound north of Oyster Bay on the coast of Long Island, New York, and south of Long Neck Point in Darien, Connecticut. Her crew survived.

=== 15 December ===
List of shipwrecks: 15 December 1983
Ship	State	Description
Dunure	Canada	The cargo ship was scuttled off Saint John's, Newfoundland.

=== 18 December ===
List of shipwrecks: 18 December 1983
Ship	State	Description
Irish Rover	United States	The 68-foot (20.7 m) crab-fishing vessel was destroyed by an explosion and fire in the Gulf of Alaska 10 nautical miles (19 km; 12 mi) north-northeast of Yakutat, Alaska. Her crew of three survived and transferred to a 26-foot (7.9 m) vessel Irish Rover had been towing.

=== 30 December ===
List of shipwrecks: 30 December 1983
Ship	State	Description
Seng Giap	Malaysia	The cargo ship ran aground at Tanjong Datu, Borneo and was abandoned by her crew. She was declared a constructive total loss. She was refloated on 6 December 1984 and consequently scrapped.

== Unknown date ==
List of shipwrecks: Unknown date 1983
Ship	State	Description
Ada Kirby	United Kingdom	The 93-foot (28 m), 125-ton cargo ship, a converted trawler, sank at La Corunna, Spain, sometime in 1983. Raised and scrapped the same year.
Kingfish	United Kingdom	The 94.4-foot (28.8 m), 151-ton oil field standby (safety) vessel, a former trawler, was damaged in a collision in the English Channel. She was sunk by the Royal Navy as a hazard to navigation.
Libellule	French Navy	The Aloe-class net laying ship was sunk as a target near Brest, France.
Raffaello	Iran	Iran–Iraq War: The floating barracks, a former ocean liner, was partially sunk in shallow water in the Persian Gulf outside Bushehr, Iran, by a torpedo attack.
"Stamila"	United Kingdom	The 55-foot (17 m) fishing vessel sank in the Lune Deeps sometime in 1983.
