= List of shipwrecks of Oregon =

This is a list of shipwrecks of Oregon. The location is the nearest modern community or primary landmark.

== North coast ==
Ship	Flag	Sunk date	Notes	Location
Santo Cristo de Burgos	Spain	1693	The Spanish galleon Santo Cristo de Burgos wrecked on Nehalem Spit en route from Manila to Acapulco, loaded with a cargo of beeswax. The existence of the wreck was recorded in native oral history, with descendants of survivors including Chief Kilchis. It is the earliest known shipwreck in the Pacific Northwest.	Nehalem
General Warren	United States	30 January 1852	A steamship that was grounded on Clatsop Spit and wrecked in heavy seas	Tillamook Head
Detroit		25 December 1855	A brig that bumped ground putting out of the Columbia River. Crew abandoned ship after she took on 7 feet (2.1 m) of water. Ship drifted south and ran aground at Tillamook Head.	Tillamook Head
Brant		1862	A schooner that was refloated.	Tillamook
Millie Bond		13 November 1871	A schooner that was wrecked on sand spit near Tillamook Bar. Refloated.	Barview
Lupatia		3 January 1881	A barque that sunk with the loss of the 16 man crew. The only survivor was the ship's dog.	Tillamook Rock
Kate L. Heron		27 April 1881	A schooner that was wrecked on Tillamook Bar. Parts washed up at Nehalem.	Barview
Pilots Bride		1 August 1881	A sloop that was stranded on Nestucca Bar.	Pacific City
Carmarthen Castle		2 December 1886	A barque that ran aground in Nestucca Bay.	Pacific City
Queen of the Bay		11 November 1887	A schooner that was wrecked at the mouth of the Nehalem River.	Nehalem
Garcia		12 December 1893	A schooner that was wrecked near Cape Meares Lighthouse.	Cape Meares
Occident		12 March 1897	A steam tug that sunk with the loss of all hands.	Nehalem
Lila and Mattie		9 March 1900	A schooner that was wrecked on Tillamook Bar.	Barview
Laguna		6 April 1900	A steamship that went ashore on north spit of Tillamook Bar. Refloated and towed back to San Francisco for repairs, but during a gale abandoned at a point ten miles SWW of Crescent City. Ran aground on July 17 at the Klamath River for a total loss.	Barview
Pioneer		17 December 1900	The schooner's remains can still be seen when erosion takes place.	Pacific City
Charles H. Merchant		11 August 1902	A schooner that was stranded on Nehalem Spit, refloated and scrapped.	Manzanita
Gem		15 February 1904	A schooner that ran aground on the beach near the Tillamook Bay north jetty.	Barview
Peter Iredale	United Kingdom	25 October 1906	The barque's remains can still be seen.	Fort Stevens
Gerald C.		10 May 1907	Wrecked on the north spit at the entrance to Nestucca harbor.	Pacific City
Antelope		30 September 1907	A schooner built 1887 in Benicia, California, for a salmon packer. Wrecked at Nehalem River.	Nehalem
Emily Reed	United States	14 February 1908	A barque that was loaded with 2,100 tons of coal, the ship ran ashore and broke apart. The captain, his wife and seven crewmen survived, but eight died. Remains are occasionally seen after storms.	Rockaway
Hill		17 June 1908	A schooner wrecked at Nehalem Bar.	Nehalem
Ida Schnauer		17 June 1908	A schooner wrecked on Tillamook Bar. While waiting for tug into harbor, wind shifted and she was pushed ashore for a total loss.	Barview
Argo #1		26 November 1909	A steamship that struck the bar off the entrance to Tillamook Bay and foundered. Two crew and two passengers were drowned. Sister ship, the Argo #2, a river steamer, went down at Dixon Entrance in Alaska.	Barview
Vida		28 April 1912	A gas schooner that lost its rudder and broke into pieces on Tillamook Bar.	Barview
George R. Vosberg		3 May 1912	A steam tug that had its hull punctured by an underwater rock. The crew attempted to plug the hole with a spare fuel tank. Though the effort was ultimately futile, the crew was rescued.	Nehalem
C.T. Hill		30 July 1912	A schooner that was stranded on the south side of the Nehalem Bar. It was later salvaged.	Nehalem
Mimi		13 February 1913	A barque that later ran aground in fog on Nehalem Spit, then capsized in salvage operation, killing 17.	Manzanita
Glenesslin	United Kingdom	1 October 1913	A square rig that sailed into the rocks at the base of Neahkahnie Mountain, on a clear day. All survived, but rocks penetrated the hull and little was salvaged. An official British Court of Inquiry found the officers guilty of gross negligence. The captain had reportedly gone to his cabin for a nap, leaving the ship in the hands of two young and relatively inexperienced mates who allowed it to drift dangerously close to the shore without alerting him until it was too late. Ultimately, Captain Williams and his second mate John Colefield had their licenses suspended for three months apeice due to negligence, and First Mate F.W. Hawarth was reprimanded. The ship was a total loss, but all 21 crew members survived.	Neahkahnie Beach
Francis H. Leggett	United States	18 September 1914	A steam schooner that was lost in a gale due to being overloaded. Two survived, but the 60 who were lost make it the worst maritime disaster in Oregon history. The railroad ties that were its cargo were used for construction in Manzanita when they washed ashore.	Manzanita
Oakland		22 March 1916	A schooner which was abandoned at sea. After running ashore, it was raised and renamed Mary Hanlon. Ultimately lost off Mendocino, California.	Manzanita
Life-Line	United States	26 May 1923	Foundered off Neahkahnie, washed ashore and covered by sand. Uncovered by a bulldozer in 1949.	Neahkahnie Beach
Venus		4 November 1923	A gas schooner that capsized on Nestucca Bar. Captain Adolph Kangiser and his engineer made a swim for shore. The captain felt something tug him down. Kicking hard he managed to free himself. Upon reaching shore, he found part of his boot missing, though he himself was not injured.	Pacific City
Phoenix		5 November 1923	A gas schooner that capsized on Tillamook Bar. Four died.	Barview
Sea Island		7 February 1932	Rum-Runner.	Tillamook
Tyee		6 December 1940	A tugboat that foundered off Tillamook Bar. The engine was ripped out, saving the crew by lightening the ship.	Barview

== Central coast ==
Ship	Flag	Sunk date	Notes	Location
Samuel Roberts		6 August 1850	Schooner	Reedsport
Bostonian		1 October 1850	Owned by a man named Gardiner, much of the vessel was salvaged and used in the building of the town of Gardiner, Oregon.	Reedsport
Almira		9 January 1852	Brig	Reedsport
Juliet		March 1852		Newport
Nassau		22 July 1852	Schooner	Reedsport
Roanoke		2 February 1853	Brig	Reedsport
Joseph Warren		25 November 1853	Barque	Newport
Fawn		21 November 1856	Brig	Florence
Calumet		8 December 1856	A schooner that was wrecked at Siletz River while offloading supplies for Indian Affairs. Captain B. Jennings.	Siletz Estuary (Nechesne)
Blanco		1864	Brig	Lincoln City
Cornelia Terry		13 October 1864	Oyster pirate schooner. Sank while being pursued by Annie G. Doyle.	Newport
Ork		24 November 1864	Barque	Reedsport
Annie G. Doyle		11 March 1865	A schooner that ran aground at nearly the same location as the pirate vessel Cornelia Terry, which it had pursued half a year prior.	Newport
Enterprise		20 February 1873	The sternwheeler's engines were later salvaged and installed on the vessel Beaver	Reedsport
John Hunter		1873		Newport
Meldon		16 March 1873	Schooner	Reedsport
Bobolink		October 1873	The schooner was salvaged, but later lost at Mendocino, California.	Reedsport
Sparrow		4 December 1875	Schooner	Reedsport
Lizzie		16 February 1876	Schooner	Newport
Caroline Medeau		5 April 1876	Schooner	Newport
Phil Sheridan		15 September 1878	A schooner that was run into by the steamer Ancon.	Reedsport
Olivia Schultze		28 April 1880	Schooner	Florence
Tacoma		29 January 1883	Steamship	Reedsport
Phoebe Fay		16 April 1883	Schooner	Newport
Ona		26 September 1883	Steam schooner	Newport
Beda		17 March 1886	Steam schooner	Yachats
Emma Utter		December 1886		Florence
Yaquina City		4 December 1887	This steamship was the predecessor of Yaquina Bay. Lost a year later at the same spot, effectively ruining the vessel owners, the Oregon Development Co.	Newport
Yaquina Bay	United States	9 December 1888	Originally named Caracas. She was the sister ship of Valencia and successor of Yaquina Bay. Ran aground near the wreckage of Yaquina City and was declared a total loss.	Newport
Alaskan	United States	13 May 1889	While sailing to San Francisco from the Columbia River, the Alaskan ran into bad weather, and the river-going vessel began to fall apart from the stress of Cape Foulweather. Sidewheeler.	Depoe Bay
Fearless		19 November 1889	Steam tug built in 1874 (the second steam tug by that name owned by Simpson Lumber Company). While en route from Astoria to Coos Bay, she failed to cross the Umpqua River bar and wrecked on the river's North Spit. Short of her destination, she was possibly attempting to take shelter from poor weather or due to a leak. Seven people were lost, including Captain James Hill. Among those aboard was cannery owner George Marshall; his body was recovered a month later.	Gardiner
Struan		25 December 1890	A schooner that was constructed in John Fraser's shipyard on Courtney Bay in Saint John, New Brunswick, in 1877	Tillamook
Maggie Ross		8 December 1891	Steamship	Newport
St. Charles		17 May 1892		Depoe Bay
Mary Gilbert		17 December 1894	Schooner	Waldport
Bandorville		21 November 1895	Steamship	Reedsport
Volante		7 March 1896	A steamship that burned in Yaquina Bay in Newport.	Newport
Truckee		18 November 1897	Steamship	Reedsport
Atalanta		17 November 1898	A clipper that ran into a reef while coasting along the shore.	Seal Rock
Nettie Sundberg		28 December 1902	Schooner	Florence
Charles Nelson		November 1903	Steam schooner	Florence
Ocean Spray		20 November 1903	Schooner	Florence
Alice Kimball		12 October 1904	Schooner	Florence
Quickstep		24 November 1904	Barquentine	Newport
Bella		25 November 1905	A schooner located just south of the south jetty at the mouth of the Siuslaw river. Often buried in sand; occasionally visible at low tides depending on sand movement.	Florence
Alpha		3 February 1907	Schooner	Reedsport
Berwick		13 March 1908	Schooner	Florence
J. Marhoffer	United States	22 April 1910	A steam schooner that caught fire off Newport, and drifted north, eventually grounding at what is now Boiler Bay. Boiler Bay was named after the discarded boiler from J. Marhoffer	Depoe Bay
Wilhelmina		22 January 1911	Gas schooner	Reedsport
Pilgram		1912	Sloop	Newport
Condor		17 November 1912	Cargo ship	Waldport
Frederick		14 April 1914	Barge	Florence
Hugh Hogan		28 April 1914	A schooner that was refloated and renamed as Ozmo.	Florence
Graywood		2 October 1915	Steam schooner	Reedsport
Anvil		11 April 1917		Florence
Washtucna		17 August 1922	Barge	Reedsport
Admiral Nicholson		16 May 1924	A steam schooner that ran aground while towing the disabled G.C. Lindauer.	Reedsport
G.C. Lindauer		16 May 1924	A steam schooner that had a history of wrecks prior to final loss at Reedsport. Came loose and lost soon after the towing Admiral Nicholson wrecked.	Reedsport
Yaquina		20 February 1935	Coast guard patrol boat. Lost while attempting to aid the crew of a barge caught on the Yaquina Bar.	Newport
Parker #2		26 February 1935	Dredge	Newport
Dorothy Joan		13 September 1945		Newport
Etta Kay		11 December 1946	Schooner	Newport
John Aspin		22 April 1948	As of 1986, portions of the cargo ship's hull were still visible at low tide.	Newport
Helori		21 December 1949	Oil screw	Reedsport
L.H. Coolidge		20 August 1951	A tugboat that ran aground at Bandon. While under tow to the Columbia River by Salvage Chief, she came loose and sank of the coast at Yachats.	Yachats
Captain Ludvig		25 June 1953		Newport
Blue Magpie	Panama	19 November 1983	Cargo ship	Newport
New Carissa	Philippines	4 February 1999	Half of the ship. This half was beached before being towed off and sunk by United States Navy. The other half is at Coos Bay. The ship broke apart at Coos Bay, with the rear portion drifting north.	Waldport

== South coast ==
Ship	Flag	Sunk date	Notes	Location
Bandon			Grounded several times before being sold. Steamship	Coos Bay
Cohansa				Coos Bay
Echo			Refloated. Sternwheeler	Bandon
Jackson				Coos Bay
New World				Coos Bay
W.L. Hackstaff		August 1849	Grounded at Rogue River. Survivors marched overland to the Willamette Valley. Schooner	Gold Beach
Captain Lincoln		30 December 1851	Schooner	Coos Bay
Anita		1852	Barque	Port Orford
Chansey		May 1854		Coos Bay
Quadratus		1856	Schooner	Coos Bay
Friendship		1860	Barque	Sixes River
Baltimore		1861	Schooner	Coos Bay
Cyclops		1862	Schooner	Coos Bay
Energy		1862	A brig with one survivor	Coos bay
Noyo		1868	Burned when her cargo of lime ignited.Schooner	Coos Bay
D.M. Hall		3 October 1868	Barque	Coos Bay
Alaska		December 1869	Schooner	Bandon
Ida D. Rogers		15 December 1869	Brig	Coos Bay
Commodore		1870	Steamship	Coos Bay
Charles Devans		February 1870	Barque	Coos Bay
Occident		3 May 1870	Barquentine	Bandon
Bunkalation		July 1870	Schooner	Cape Blanco
Jenny Thelin		1874	Refloated. Lost for good later at Punta Maria, California.Schooner	
Laura May		1874	Schooner	Coos Bay
Northwester		1875	Schooner	Gold Beach
Mary Schowner		1876	Schooner	Bandon
Messenger		1876	Sternwheeler	Coos Bay
Harriet Rose		28 January 1876	Schooner	Port Orford
Perpetua		24 October 1876	Foundered in a gale offshore. Brig	Coos Bay
Oregonian		16 January 1877	Schooner	Bandon
Esther Colos		21 October 1879	Schooner	Gold Beach
Gussie Telfair		25 September 1880	Formerly a Confederate blockade runner named Gertrude that had been captured. Steamship	Coos Bay
Victoria		28 November 1883	Steamship	Port Orford / Cape Blanco
Mose		28 July 1884		Port Orford
Escort		21 December 1886	Sank in bay when its boiler exploded. Tugboat	Coos Bay
Dawn		3 February 1887	Drifted for nine days before being towed into Coos Bay. However, abandoned due to the ship being waterlogged. Scow	Coos Bay
Ocean King		26 December 1887	Destroyed by on board fire. Cargo ship	Cape Blanco
Julia H. Ray		26 January 1889	Schooner	Coos Bay
Parkersburg		18 November 1889	Ran aground during storm attempting to enter Coquille River. Schooner	Bandon
Rosalind		18 February 1890	Schooner	Gold Beach
Express		8 September 1891	Destroyed by fire. Steamship	Coos bay
General Butler		8 December 1891	Started breaking up 100 miles (160 km) offshore. Part of hull drifted north and ran aground at the Yaquina jetty. Barque	Coos bay / Cape Blanco
Charles W. Wetmore	United States	8 September 1892	Previously ran afoul of Columbia Bar after rudder came loose. Steamship	Coos Bay
Emily		17 July 1893	Repaired and renamed Arago. The re-christened Arago sank at the same location. Steam schooner	Coos Bay
T.W. Lucas		24 October 1894	Brig	Port Orford
Bawnmore		28 August 1895	Steamship	Bandon
Ella Laurena		18 December 1895	Abandoned by crew during a storm. Found ran aground the next day. Schooner	Coos Bay
Arago		20 October 1896	Struck bar previously in 1891 at same location. Steamboat	Coos Bay
Cyclone		1897	Destroyed by fire prior to launch. Schooner	
Moro		6 December 1897	Gas schooner	Bandon
Eureka		30 November 1899	Schooner	Bandon
Monterey		19 May 1900	Salvaged and converted into a whaler. Schooner	Coos Bay
South Portland		19 October 1903	Steamboat	Cape Blanco
Fulton		12 February 1904		Port Orford
Western Home		13 November 1904	Schooner	Bandon
Del Norte		1905	Collided with the vessel Sea Foam. Steam schooner	Bandon
Onward		25 February 1905	Schooner	Bandon
Sacramento		15 October 1905	Schooner	Coos Bay
Melanope		December 1906	Began as a Cape Horn windjammer in 1876, turned into a barge after damage at Cape Blanco in 1906. Sunk to form part of breakwater at Royston, British Columbia in 1946. Barge	Cape Blanco
Daisy		1907	Destroyed by forest fire prior to launch. Schooner	
Chinook		12 April 1907	Schooner	Coos Bay
Novelty		20 September 1907	Schooner	Coos Bay
Marconi		23 March 1909	Schooner	Coos Bay
Czarina		12 January 1910	Steamship	Bandon
San Buenaventura		14 January 1910	Abandoned. Final resting spot unknown. Schooner	Cape Blanco
Washcalore		21 May 1911	Oil schooner	Gold Beach
North Star #1		20 January 1912	Motor launch	Coos Bay
Osprey		1 November 1912	Gas schooner	Coos Bay
Advent		8 February 1913	Schooner	Coos Bay
Randolph		15 April 1915	Gas schooner	Bandon
Claremont		22 May 1915	Steam schooner	Coos Bay
Santa Clara		2 November 1915	Formally named John S. Kimball and then James Dollar. Steam schooner	Coos Bay
Fifield		21 February 1916	Second ship named Fifield. Steam schooner	Bandon
Sinaloa		15 June 1917	Gas schooner	Cape Blanco
Wallacut		3 November 1918	Barge	Coos Bay
Rustler		24 August 1919	Destroyed by on board fire.	
J. A. Chanslor	United States	18 December 1919	Oiler	Cape Blanco
Adel		2 October 1920		Coos Bay
Joan of Arc		15 November 1920	Steamboat	Gold Beach
Ozmo		17 May 1922	Originally christened as Hugh Hogan. Schooner	Port Orford
Sea Eagle		20 November 1822	Wrecked while towing the vessel Ecola. Ecola survived. Tugboat	Coos Bay
Brush		26 April 1923	Steamship	Coos Bay
C.A. Smith		16 December 1923	Steam schooner	Coos Bay
Columbia		17 February 1924	Steam schooner	Coos Bay
Acme		31 October 1924	Steam schooner	Bandon
Mary E. Moore		23 February 1927	Steam schooner	Bandon
Sujameco		28 February 1929	A steamboat that ran aground at Horsfall Beach in heavy fog missing Coos Bay entrance by a few miles. During World War II much of the hull was scrapped for iron. The wreck is partially visible each winter due to seasonal sand movement; more than usual emerged April 2010.	Coos Bay
Fort Bragg		14 September 1932	Hit south jetty and ran aground inland. Steam schooner	Coos Bay
E. L. Smith		1 January 1936	Gas schooner	Bandon
Phyllis		9 March 1936	Scuttled by captain after ship sprang a leak. Steam schooner	Port Orford
Golden West		29 March 1936	Cargo ship	Bandon
Golden Bear		1937	Superstructure began to fall apart, incapacitating the ship and crew. Towed by Active and converted into a barge. Now a part of a breakwater in British Columbia. Cargo ship	Coos Bay
Cottoneva		10 February 1937	Originally christened as Frank D. Stout. Steam schooner	Port Orford
Willapa #2		2 December 1941	Formerly christened Florence Olson. Crew saved by local fishermen. Steam schooner	Port Orford
SS Camden		4 October 1942	Torpedoed off Coos Bay by the Japanese submarine I-25. Towed north by tug Kenai to attempt salvage. Sank off Grays Harbor several days later. Oiler	Coos Bay
Larry Doheny		5 October 1942	Torpedoed and sank off Gold Beach by the Japanese submarine I-25. Oiler	Gold Beach
Susan Olson		15 November 1942	Formerly named Willamette and California. Steam schooner	Port Orford
Y M S #133		21 February 1943	A minesweeper	Coos Bay
George L. Olson		23 June 1944	Formerly named Ryder Hanify. Steam schooner	Coos Bay
Alvarado		16 March 1945	Steam schooner	Coos Bay
Ida M.		23 September 1948		Coos Bay
Alice H.		23 September 1950		Port Orford
Helen E.		September 1951	A patrol boat that was grounded and burned.	Coos Bay
Cynthia Olson		9 June 1952	Salvaged by crew of Salvage Chief and repaired. Sister ship of Oliver Olson. Cargo ship	Bandon
Oliver Olson		3 November 1953	Filled with rocks and sank as extension of the south Coquille River jetty. Sister ship of Cynthia Olson. Cargo ship	Bandon
Port of Pasco #510		12 December 1953	Barge	Coos Bay
Andrew Jackson		5 March 1954		Gold Beach
New Carissa	Philippines	4 February 1999	After running aground, oil cargo was burned out. Half of the ship remained beached while the other half was taken out to sea and scuttled. Remaining half has since been scrapped. Cargo ship	Coos Bay

== Rivers ==
Ship	Flag	Sunk date	Notes	River	Location
Bully Washington		12 December 1857	Filled in as the foundation of a dock. Steamship	Umpqua River	Scottsburg
Telephone		5 January 1892	A steamship that struck the revetment on the eastern shore of Coon Island. Heavy fog prevented the pilot from seeing its red cautionary light. The 80 passengers and 30 crew members were all saved.	Multnomah Channel / Willamette River	Scappoose
Regulator		13 July 1898	A steamship that was wrecked on the rocks. The 160 passengers and most of the freight were landed on the Oregon shore. Towed in to drydock at Cascade Locks around 1 September. The hull was found to be a "complete wreck".	Columbia River	Cascade Locks
Gypsy		11 June 1900	Tore hole in bottom and sank in ten feet (3.0 m) of water. Steamship	Willamette River	Independence
Rogue River		16 November 1902	Struck a rock at what is now known as either Boiler Rapid or Boiler Riffle. Sternwheeler	Rogue River	Gold Hill
Welcome		13 November 1904	Sternwheeler	Coquille River	Myrtle Point

== See also ==
- Graveyard of the Pacific
- Shipwrecks of the inland Columbia River
- Lists of Oregon-related topics
