= Twin Rocks =

Twin Rocks may refer to:

- Twin Rocks, Alaska, near Kiska Island, Alaska
- Twin Rocks (Antarctica), Twin rock bluffs in the Lower Staircase of Skelton Glacier, Antarctica
- Twin Rocks, Seward-Hope, Alaska, near Seward, Alaska
- Twin Rocks, Oregon
- Twin Rocks, Pennsylvania
