= San Francisco and Oakland Helicopter Airlines =

Helicopter airline in California

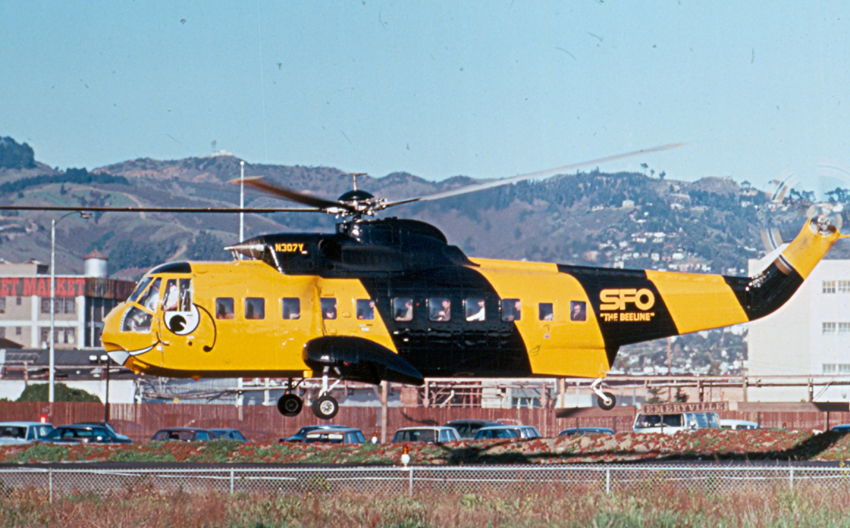
IATA	ICAO	Call sign
SFO	—	—
- Founded: 1961; 64 years ago
- Commenced operations: June 1, 1961; 64 years ago
- Ceased operations: 1985; 40 years ago
- Headquarters: Oakland, California
- Key people: Mike Bagen

San Francisco and Oakland Helicopter Airlines (also known as SFO Helicopter Airlines and SFO Helicopter) was a helicopter airline service offering scheduled passenger flights between San Francisco, Oakland, and other Bay Area cities. It was founded in 1961 but disappeared from the Official Airline Guide 15 years later before finally going out of business in 1986.

== History ==
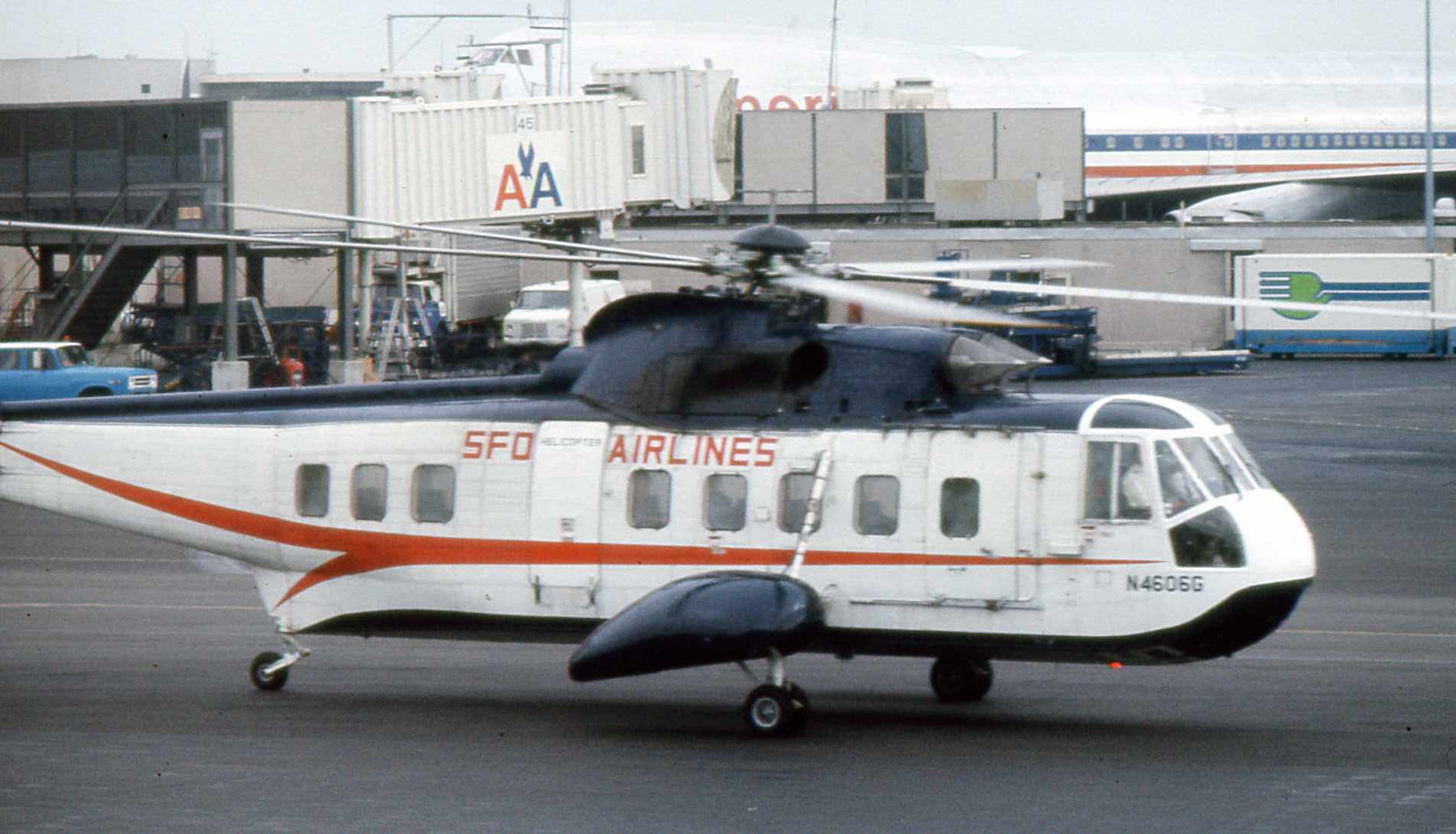
A Sikorsky S-61 of the airline.

San Francisco and Oakland Helicopter Airlines was one of the first helicopter airlines to operate without a federal subsidy and it was also the first to operate with only turbine engine helicopters. Since helicopter landing sites were scarce at that time, the port of Oakland's board committee supported the service. Passenger flights started with two leased 10-passenger Sikorsky S-62 turbine helicopters. In late summer of 1961, the SFO Helicopter Airlines system timetable stated that 68 flights a day were operated, with the airline claiming that its helicopters made less noise than neighborhood trucks. In 1962, the U.S. Post Office Department granted San Francisco and Oakland Helicopter Airlines airmail contract number AM-103, allowing it to transport U.S. Mail until 1976. Also in 1962, SFO Helicopter was operating sight seeing aerial tours on weekends and holidays during the summer months from Fisherman's Wharf, San Francisco with a fare of $4.50 for adults and $3.50 for children. In 1965, the airline tried operating a 15-seat Bell SK-5 hovercraft between San Francisco International Airport (SFO), Oakland International Airport (OAK), and San Francisco. In 1969, it carried 320,000 passengers on more than 100 helicopter flights a day. According to the April 27, 1969 SFO Helicopter Airlines timetable, each arriving and departing flight at SFO served not one but two gates: American Airlines gate 45 and TWA gate 53 with staggered arrival and departure times for each flight at each gate being reflected in the timetable. In May 1968, after continuous growth, the company's schedule reached 14 weekday departures from the San Francisco Ferry Building, 11 from Marin, 13 from Berkeley, three from a parking garage in Oakland (known as AlcoPark), and 9 from Lafayette. For interline passengers connecting at SFO and then heading east beyond Colorado, the ticket to SFO cost $4.75 from Marin or Lafayette and only $4.50 from Berkeley.

The San Francisco and Oakland Helicopter Airlines' fleet as of 1965 consisted of one Sikorsky S-62 helicopter and three Sikorsky S-61N helicopters.

The airline was declared bankrupt in July 1970 and by the end of the year, destinations had been reduced to Marin, Berkeley, SFO, and OAK. In 1973-1974, Emeryville replaced Berkeley as one of their reduced destinations. According to the October 26, 1975 SFO Helicopter Airlines timetable, 53 flights were being operated on a daily basis with an additional 26 flights being operated every day except on Saturdays with service being flown from San Francisco International Airport, Oakland International Airport, Marin County and Emeryville.

A mechanics strike in 1976 exacerbated difficulties for the airline and they disappeared from the Official Airline Guide that year.

SFO Helicopter Airlines resumed scheduled passenger service by 1983. According to the July 1, 1983 Pocket OAG, 22 round trip flights were being operated every weekday with Bell 206 helicopters between San Francisco International Airport and Oakland International Airport. This same referenced OAG also lists competition from another helicopter airline on the SFO-OAK route: Spirit Heliporter operating 25 round trip flights every weekday with Bell 206 helicopters with this same company also flying 24 round trip flights every weekday between SFO and China Basin in San Francisco. By 1985, the OAG listed SFO Helicopter service between SFO and OAK and also between SFO and the Oakland Convention Center with all flights being operated with Bell 206 helicopters.

== Destinations ==
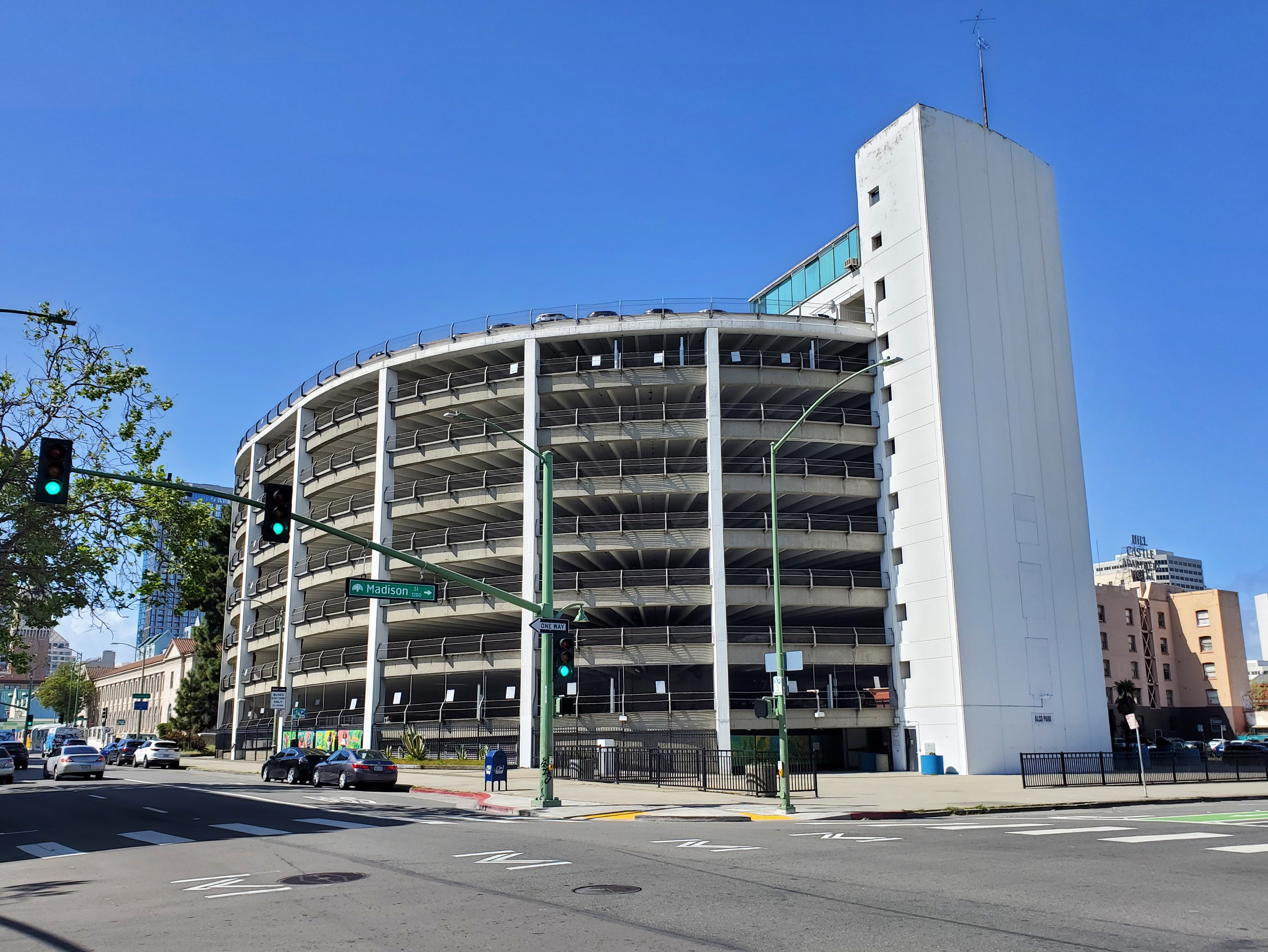
The Alcopark garage in Oakland

The following destinations were served at various times by San Francisco and Oakland Helicopter Airlines during its existence:

- San Francisco (SFO, San Francisco International Airport)
- San Francisco (heliport at 37.7967°N 122.3942°W just north of San Francisco Ferry Building)
- San Francisco Pier 50B - (used by the hovercraft operation)
- Oakland (OAK, Oakland International Airport)
- Oakland, CA (heliport code JOK, roof of the Alameda County Parking Garage, known as AlcoPark, at 37.8008°N 122.2654°W)
- Oakland, CA (heliport code JFZ, roof of the Hyatt Hotel Parking Garage 14th and Broadway
- Oakland, CA (10th St southeast of Fallon)
- Berkeley, CA (heliport code JBK, north side of University Ave, about 37.8668°N 122.3063°W) near the Berkeley Marina.
- Concord, CA - Buchanan Field Airport (CCR)
- Emeryville, CA
- Lafayette, CA (near 3738 Mt Diablo Blvd, "behind Hillside Motel", about 37.8904°N 122.1332°W)
- San Jose Municipal Airport (SJC, now San Jose International Airport)
- Sunnyvale, CA (heliport code JSV, International Science Center Heliport)
- Palo Alto Municipal Airport (Palo Alto Airport)
- Commodore Seaplane Base, Sausalito, CA (37.8798°N 122.5138°W) in Marin County

== See also ==
- Helijet helicopter airline
- Los Angeles Airways helicopter airline
- New York Airways helicopter airline
- List of defunct airlines of the United States
