= J. Marhoffer =

Coordinates: 44.82955°N 124.06489°W

The J. Marhoffer was a steamboat that was wrecked on May 18, 1910, just south of Lincoln City, Oregon, United States. While underway to Portland under Captain Gustav Peterson, the vessel caught fire and ran aground at Boiler Bay, then known as Brigg's Landing. Her boiler still sits in the small inlet and can be viewed on calm days.

== Service history ==
The J. Marhoffer, named for a prominent businessman in Crescent City, California, was built in 1906-1907 by the Lindstrom Shipbuilding Company in Aberdeen, Washington for the Olson & Mahony Company as a sister ship to the Jim Butler. Designed for the coastal lumber trade, the ship was 180 feet (55 meters) long, with a 38-foot (12-meter) beam. With a total cost of $85,000, it was launched in February, 1907, under the command of Captain A. Nygran, who sailed the ship to Portland, Oregon to be fitted out by the Willamette Iron and Steel Works.

Barely a month after entering service and while returning from her maiden voyage on June 26, 1907, the J. Marhoffer grounded in Shoalwater Bay, resulting the loss of her rudder. After $10,000 in repairs, the ship was returned to service by the end of July, with permanent repairs completed by the end of the year. After this eventful first trip, the ship served for an uneventful two and a half years sailing between Washington and San Francisco, California until wrecking on May 18, 1910.

== The wreck ==
While underway to reload in Portland after dropping off her cargo in San Francisco, an assistant engineer on board tried to light an unfamiliar design gas torch, while the chief engineer was napping in his cabin. However, his inexperience and determination to light the torch caused it to explode and throw burning fuel throughout the oil-soaked engine room. The flames spread quickly and soon much of the ship was ablaze, even before the burned engineer could make it on deck to alert the crew. The engine continued to run at speed, but was too hot for the crew to approach and flood it. Captain Peterson then ordered the crew to abandon ship. The Captain, his wife, the crew, and the ship's dog were able to abandon the burning vessel in her two lifeboats. The J. Marhoffer continued north without the crew, a burning beacon visible in Depoe Bay.

It was not long before the doomed vessel ran aground at Brigg's Landing, where a sizable crowd from the surrounding area had already gathered to watch the burning ship crash. Shortly after, the vessel was destroyed as a large explosion ripped through her. The explosion launched debris a half a mile to a mile inland. Nobody on shore was injured by the explosion.

One local described the event as follows:

"I could see a small speck drift astern of here, and I figured it was the lifeboat with her people. Then she came charging in belching flames, sparks and smoke like a volcano."

He later added:

"She piled onto the rocks with a helluva crunching crash, heeled way over to starboard, then lay there burning like a blast furnace. All of a sudden her tanks exploded and shot timbers, chunks of steel and flame clear up into the trees behind me, a quarter of a mile away,"

Meanwhile, the crew made their way to land, intending to put ashore at Fogarty Creek just north of the bay. A woman on shore used a red shirt to signal to the crew where they should put ashore. However, the crew took this to mean that the landing was unsafe and rowed back out to sea. They put ashore at Whale Cove to the south of Depoe Bay. The only fatality of the incident was the ship's cook, who died of injuries received.

== The J. Marhoffer today ==
Today, very little remains of the J. Marhoffer. The 12 feet (370 cm) diameter boiler can still be seen at the bottom of the bay at low tide. During extreme low tides, on calm days, it is possible for visitors to walk down to the boiler.

== See also ==
- List of Oregon shipwrecks
