= Burmah Agate =

Ship built in 1963

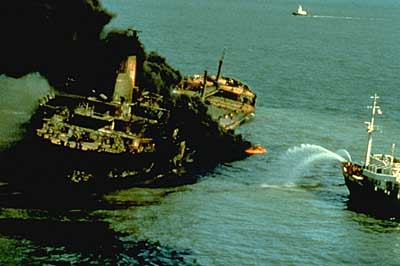
- Burmah Agate

History

Liberia
- Name: Burmah Agate
- Fate: Scrapped, 1980

General characteristics
- Type: Oil tanker
- Tonnage: 61,674 DWT
- Crew: 37

MT Burmah Agate was an oil tanker that was involved in a nautical collision and subsequent oil spill near Galveston, Texas in November 1979. 31 crewmen were killed in the collision, and the oil spill damaged the local environment.

== Incident ==
On the morning of November 1, 1979, the Liberian-flagged Burmah Agate, while in the customary anchorage area for the Port of Houston inbound to Galveston Bay with 400,000 bbl (17,000,000 US gal; 64,000,000 L) of fuel^{A}, was struck by the outbound freighter Mimosa just outside the entrance to the Galveston Bay channel. The Mimosa struck the Burmah Agate on its starboard side, tearing an 8-by-15-foot (2.4 by 4.6 m) hole near Cargo Tank No. 5, and setting off an explosion that ignited the now-leaking oil. The tanker started to founder, with fire raging on its starboard side and superstructure. The Mimosa was also set afire by the explosion - its crew evacuated, and the vessel was left without command, circling its dropped anchor. Unable to shut off the Mimosa's engines due to the fires, the rescuers eventually fouled its propeller, and Mimosa was towed to Galveston several days after the collision.

The U.S. Coast Guard dispatched a Sikorsky HH-52A helicopter (tail number 1426, currently in the Smithsonian Air and Space Collection) and the cutter Valiant to begin search and rescue operations, lifting men off the ships using helicopters. By 12:30, all 26 crew members of the Mimosa had been accounted for, but only 6 of Burmah Agate's 37 crew survived, and 4 bodies were recovered. The firefighting operation was led by Valiant and supported by several tugboats, but lack of crew training on the tugs hampered firefighting efforts. The fire on board Burmah Agate burned until January 8, 1980, and the ship was subsequently towed to Brownsville, Texas, for scrapping on February 1.

=== Oil spill ===
Oil began escaping the hulk of the Burmah Agate immediately after the collision. Nearly half of the oil burned upon spilling and seasonal winds kept much of the remaining oil offshore, but large quantities of oil caused environmental damage. Large concentrations washed ashore at Galveston and San Jose island, while lighter quantities came ashore at Padre island and on the Bolivar Peninsula. Booms and skimmers were employed to protect beaches, while effected marshlands were not cleaned.^{B} Heavy winter seas and a constant rotation of ships used to contain the spill slowed the cleanup effort.

An estimated 2.6 million US gallons (9,800 m^{3}) of oil were released into the environment, with another 7.8 million US gallons (30,000 m^{3}) consumed by the fire. A government report of the spill estimated that, of the oil spilled, 48 percent burned, 38 percent was recovered through lightering, 12 percent dispersed offshore, 1.7 percent was recovered by skimmers, and 0.5 percent directly impacted beaches.
