= Watseco, Oregon =

Unincorporated community in the state of Oregon, United States

Watseco
- Unincorporated community
- Location within Oregon Location within the United States
- Coordinates: 45°35′10″N 123°56′52″W
- Country: United States
- State: Oregon
- County: Tillamook
- Elevation: 16 ft (4.9 m)
- Time zone: UTC-8 (Pacific (PST))
  - Summer (DST): UTC-7 (PDT)
- Area code: 503
- GNIS feature ID: 1166719
- Coordinates and elevation from Geographic Names Information System

Watseco is an unincorporated community in Tillamook County, Oregon, United States. It is near two other unincorporated communities in Tillamook County, Barview and Twin Rocks. The three communities are all along a 3-mile (5 km) stretch of U.S. Route 101 between the cities of Rockaway Beach and Garibaldi.

According to Oregon Geographic Names, brothers George and Robert Watt bought 360 acres (150 ha) of beachfront land here in the early 20th century. When the Pacific Railway and Navigation Company railway came through in 1912, the brothers granted right-of-way on condition that the railway company add a flag stop on the Watt property. The name of the community and flag stop is a combination of "Watt" and "Sea Coast", assigned in 1916. Watseco Creek, named after the station, flows through the community.
