= Boiler Bay State Scenic Viewpoint =

State park in Oregon, USA

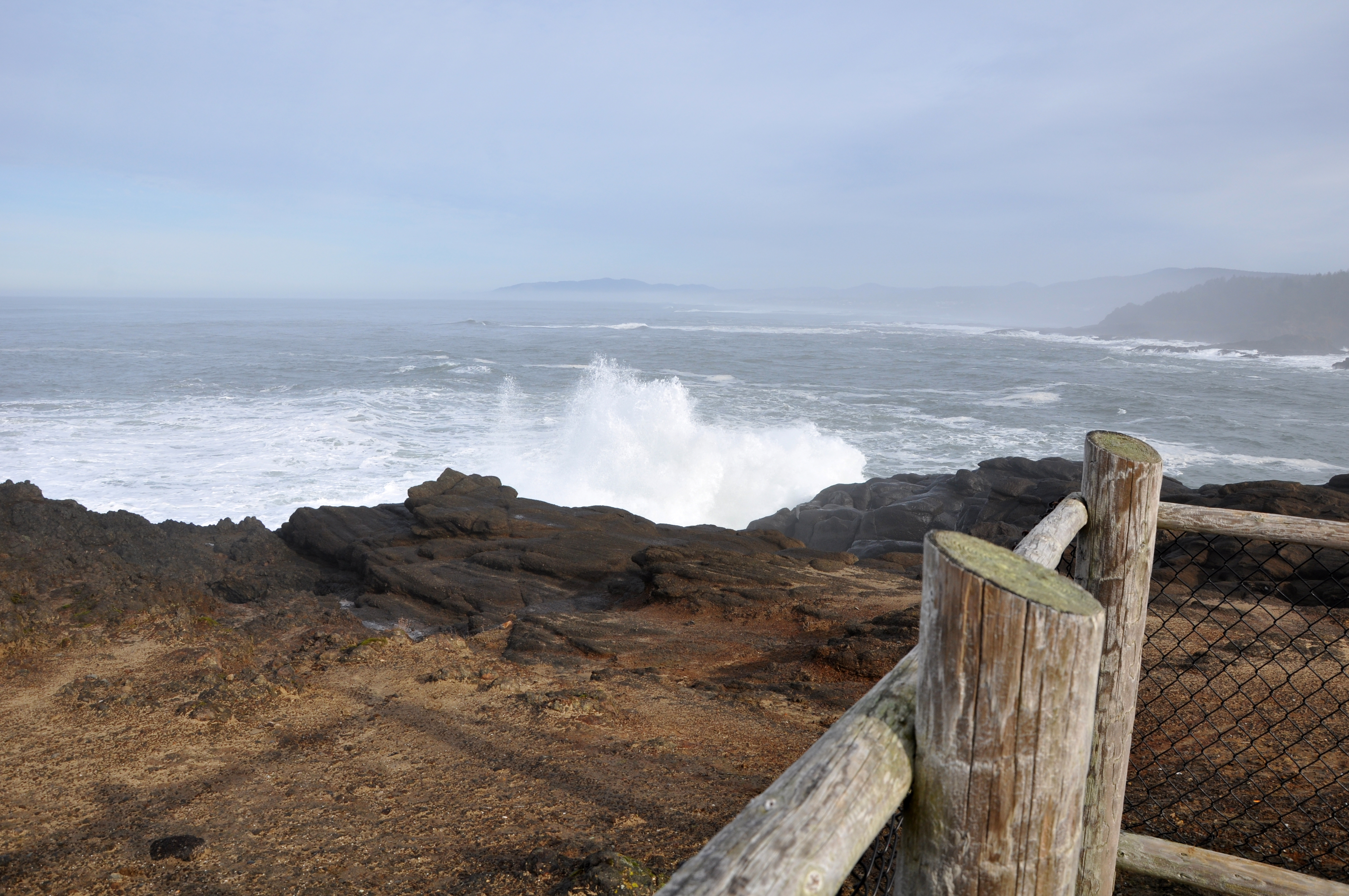
- Sea spray at Boiler Bay

- Location within Oregon Location within the United States
- Interactive map of Boiler Bay State Scenic Viewpoint
- Type: Public, state
- Location: Lincoln County, Oregon
- Nearest city: Depoe Bay
- Coordinates: 44°49′40″N 124°03′52″W
- Operator: Oregon Parks and Recreation Department
- Status: Open

Boiler Bay State Scenic Viewpoint is a state park in the U.S. state of Oregon, administered by the Oregon Parks and Recreation Department. The park is one mile (1.6 km) north of Depoe Bay, Oregon.

Boiler Bay Viewpoint overlooks the small Boiler Bay. Boiler Bay was named after the vessel J. Marhoffer was run aground in the small bay—then known as Brigg's Landing—on May 18, 1910, after a fire spread throughout the engine room. Soon after, the burning 175-foot (53 m) schooner's fuel tanks exploded. Witnesses claim debris was launched nearly a half mile to a mile inland. The remains of the vessel were left in the bay, including her engine boiler. Today, the boiler can still be seen at extreme low tides.

== See also ==
- List of Oregon state parks
- List of Oregon shipwrecks
- J. Marhoffer
