= Twin Rocks, Oregon =

Unincorporated community in the state of Oregon, United States

Twin Rocks
- Unincorporated community
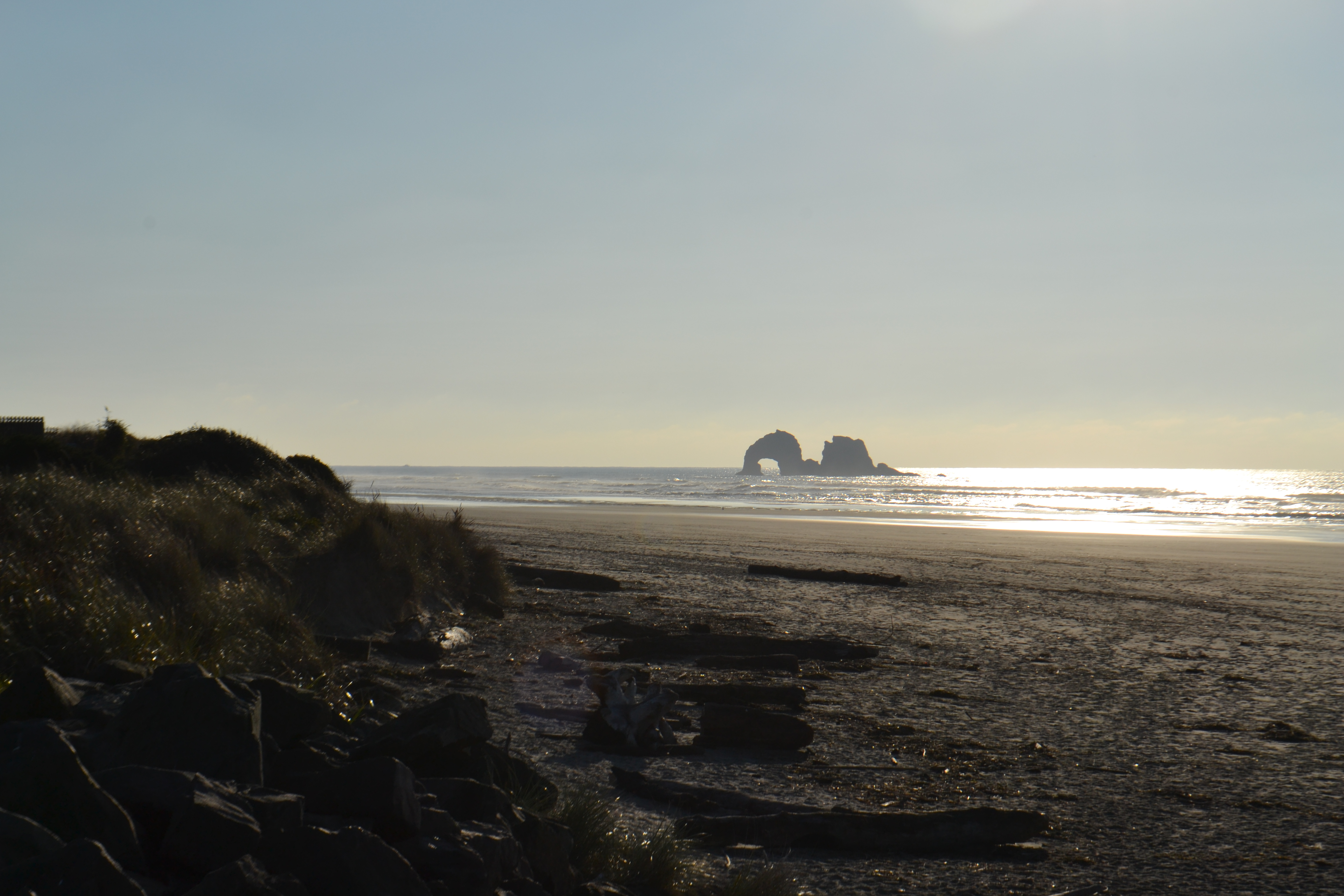
- Offshore features for which the community is named

- Location within the state of Oregon Twin Rocks (the United States)
- Coordinates: 45°35′52″N 123°56′41″W
- Country: United States
- State: Oregon
- County: Tillamook
- Elevation: 16 ft (4.9 m)
- Time zone: UTC-8 (Pacific (PST))
  - Summer (DST): UTC-7 (PDT)
- ZIP code: 97136
- Area codes: 503 and 971
- GNIS feature ID: 1136853
- Coordinates and elevation from Geographic Names Information System

Twin Rocks is an unincorporated community in Tillamook County, Oregon, United States, on the Oregon Coast. Twin Rocks, founded as a summer resort community, was named for two offshore rocks, 100 feet (30 m) high, in the Pacific Ocean. Twin Rocks post office was established in 1914, with William E. Dunsmoor as the first postmaster. The post office closed in 1954.

Twin Rocks is near two other unincorporated communities in Tillamook County, Barview and Watseco. The three communities are all along a 3-mile (5 km) stretch of U.S. Route 101 between the cities of Rockaway Beach and Garibaldi.

Twin Rocks Friends Camp in the community was founded in 1918.

== In culture ==
Twin Rocks gave its name to folk singer Shawn Mullins' song "Twin Rocks, Oregon", which appears on his 1998 album Soul's Core.
