= Barview, Tillamook County, Oregon =

Unincorporated community in the state of Oregon, United States

Barview
- Unincorporated community
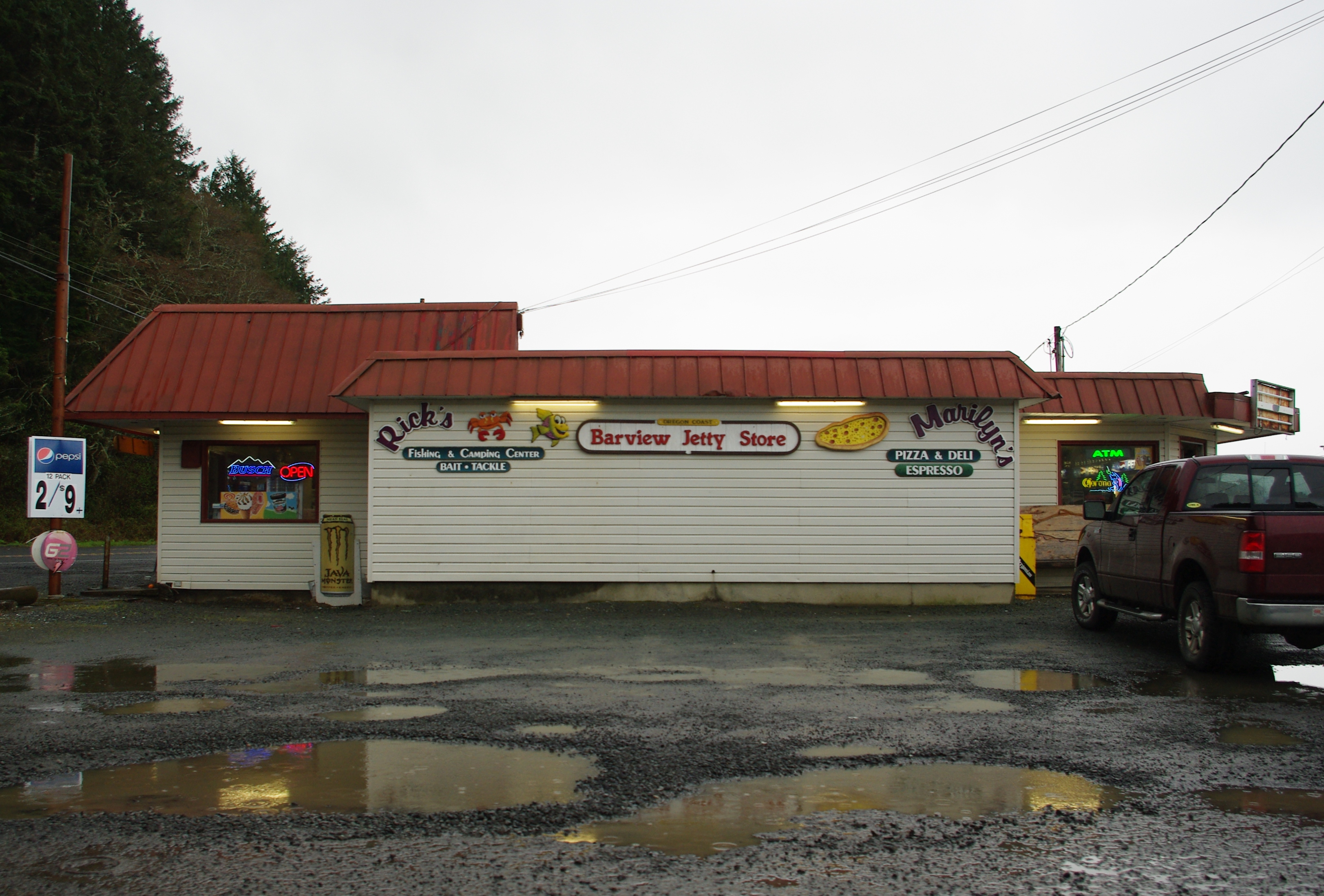
- Store in Barview

- Location within the state of Oregon Barview (the United States)
- Coordinates: 45°34′11″N 123°56′36″W
- Country: United States
- State: Oregon
- County: Tillamook
- Elevation: 23 ft (7.0 m)
- Time zone: UTC-8 (Pacific (PST))
  - Summer (DST): UTC-7 (PDT)
- ZIP codes: 97136
- Area codes: 503 and 971
- GNIS feature ID: 1166612

Barview is an unincorporated community in Tillamook County, Oregon, United States, named in 1884 by L. C. Smith for its exceptional view of the bar at the entrance to Tillamook Bay.

== Geography ==
Barview is near two other unincorporated communities in Tillamook County, Twin Rocks and Watseco. The three communities are along the 3-mile (5 km) stretch of U.S. Route 101 between the cities of Rockaway Beach and Garibaldi.

== Life saving station ==
The Tillamook Life Saving Station, designed by Victor Mindeleff and built in 1908, is in Barview. It was part of the United States Life-Saving Service, which provided aid to mariners in distress. The property, transferred to private ownership during World War II, is the only remaining such station in Oregon.

The building and adjacent boathouse are vacant and neglected, and have sustained damage through a car crash and a leaking sewer main. Barview is also home to Barview Jetty County Park, managed by Tillamook County and located at the mouth of Tillamook Bay on the north shore. The jetty is composed of 37,000 tons of stone designed to resist ocean waves and the park spans over 160 acres of coastal forest and dunes, offering 242 tent sites and 73 full hook-up RV sites, as well as 20 hiker/biker campsites. The park is a noted destination for Dungeness crab fishing, surfing, scuba diving, birdwatching, and tide pool exploration. Explorer Robert Gray first set foot on the shores of Tillamook Bay in August 1788.. With the future of the building in flux, it was listed as one of the Historic Preservation League of Oregon's Most Endangered Places in Oregon 2011.
