= J. A. Chanslor =

Wrecked oil tanker

J. A. Chanslor was an oil tanker built in 1910 which was wrecked off of Cape Blanco, Oregon, on 18 December 1919, with only three survivors of the 38 crew.

== History ==
The J. A. Chanslor was a 4,936 GRT or 4,938-ton capacity oil tanker built by Newport News Shipbuilding & Dry Dock Company at Newport News, Virginia, in 1910. It was 378 feet (115 m) in length with a beam of 52 feet (16 m). It had a draft of 29.5 feet (9.0 m).

The ship was named for J. A. Chanslor, who, with Charles A. Canfield, formed the Chanslor-Canfield Midway Oil Company, which began drilling operations in the Midway oil field in late 1901. Canfield's oil interests were eventually assimilated into the Associated Oil Company. Owned by the Associated Oil Company, the vessel's home port was San Francisco, California.

== Incident ==
Early on, 18 December 1919, while en route from Portland, Oregon, to San Francisco, the ship struck rocks off of Cape Blanco, on the southern Oregon coast, in dense fog and sank. On course at noon, a strong cross-current swept the steamer out of her plot, unknown to her crew, and in the poor visibility, the jagged rocks were not observed until it was too late, according to a statement made by her captain, recovering in hospital in Bandon, Oregon. The ship struck at 6 p.m. and split with the stern and after half of the hull dropping away immediately. No one in the engine room had a chance to escape. The vessel broke in two and only the bridge was showing above the sea. Fifteen men of the 36 crew escaped the foundering vessel in a single lifeboat but only three made it ashore alive. No passengers were carried, this being contrary to company regulations.

The lifeboat drifted north during the night and arrived at a point 30 miles (48 km) north of Cape Blanco, and about 4 miles (6.4 km) north of Bandon, but overturned in the surf while attempting to reach shore. The rescued men were reported recovering in hospital after their ordeal.

A representative of the Associated Oil Company was expected at Marshfield, Oregon, on 22 December to make arrangements for sending the bodies to the San Francisco Company headquarters. Captain Johnson, of the United States Coast Guard, inspected the wrecked vessel on 21 December, and hoped a diver could approach the site as conditions improved and became the most favorable since the ship struck the rocks.

Efforts were made on 23–24 December to reach the sunken vessel to recover the bodies, but little hope was given that this would succeed.
