= List of listed buildings in Dunscore, Dumfries and Galloway =

This is a list of listed buildings in the parish of Dunscore in Dumfries and Galloway, Scotland.

== List ==
Name	Location	Date Listed	Grid Ref. (Note: Sometimes known as OSGB36, the grid reference (where provided) is based on the British national grid reference system used by the Ordnance Survey. • "Guide to National Grid". Ordnance Survey. • "Get-a-map". Ordnance Survey.)	Geo-coordinates	Notes	LB Number (Note: Historic Environment Scotland assign a unique alphanumeric identifier to each designated site in Scotland, for listed buildings this always begins with "LB", for example "LB12345".)	Image
Dunscore Old Churchyard (Near Farthingwell)				55°07′55″N 3°41′06″W	Category B	4229	Upload Photo
Upper Maccubbington Farmhouse				55°08′06″N 3°43′11″W	Category B	4165	Upload Photo
Dalgonar Bridge Over Cairn Water				55°08′17″N 3°47′22″W	Category A	4227	Upload Photo
Dunscore Village Fairview				55°08′26″N 3°46′41″W	Category C(S)	4231	Upload Photo
Friars Carse Former Stables Including Beech Cottage				55°08′47″N 3°41′20″W	Category B	4234	Upload Photo
Dunscore Village Dunscore Parish Church And Churchyard				55°08′25″N 3°46′47″W	Category A	4230	Upload another image See more images
Lagganhill House And Steading Wing				55°08′08″N 3°44′27″W	Category C(S)	4236	Upload Photo
Demperston Farmhouse				55°08′45″N 3°46′09″W	Category C(S)	4228	Upload Photo
Bogrie				55°08′41″N 3°51′56″W	Category B	4248	Upload Photo
Stroquan Lodge, Gates And Gatepiers				55°08′00″N 3°48′39″W	Category B	4161	Upload Photo
Throughgate Macphail Drover's Toll Tower House R J Cessford (House And Veterinary Surgery)				55°08′22″N 3°46′03″W	Category C(S)	4163	Upload Photo
Ellisland Farmhouse And Steading				55°08′15″N 3°40′49″W	Category A	4232	Upload Photo
Friars Carse Burns Hermitage				55°08′36″N 3°41′12″W	Category B	4233	Upload Photo
Craigenputtock				55°07′13″N 3°55′42″W	Category B	4250	Upload Photo
Stroquan Walled Garden				55°07′54″N 3°48′53″W	Category C(S)	4160	Upload Photo
Upper Kilroy (Or High Kilroy) Farmhouse And Steading				55°07′52″N 3°41′52″W	Category B	4164	Upload Photo
Chapel Mill Block				55°08′32″N 3°49′58″W	Category B	4249	Upload Photo
Stroquan House				55°07′56″N 3°48′59″W	Category B	4159	Upload Photo
Sundaywell Tower Farmhouse And Steading				55°08′23″N 3°51′58″W	Category B	4162	Upload Photo
Hearse House				55°08′25″N 3°46′37″W	Category B	6579	Upload Photo
Glenesslin Farmhouse				55°08′01″N 3°49′26″W	Category C(S)	4235	Upload Photo
Maccheynston Farmhouse				55°08′26″N 3°43′04″W	Category B	4237	Upload Photo

== Key ==
The scheme for classifying buildings in Scotland is:

- Category A: "buildings of national or international importance, either architectural or historic; or fine, little-altered examples of some particular period, style or building type."
- Category B: "buildings of regional or more than local importance; or major examples of some particular period, style or building type, which may have been altered."
- Category C: "buildings of local importance; lesser examples of any period, style, or building type, as originally constructed or moderately altered; and simple traditional buildings which group well with other listed buildings."

In March 2016 there were 47,288 listed buildings in Scotland. Of these, 8% were Category A, and 50% were Category B, with the remaining 42% being Category C.
