= Sikorsky HH-52 Seaguard =

1958 transport helicopter family by Sikorsky

HH-52 Seaguard
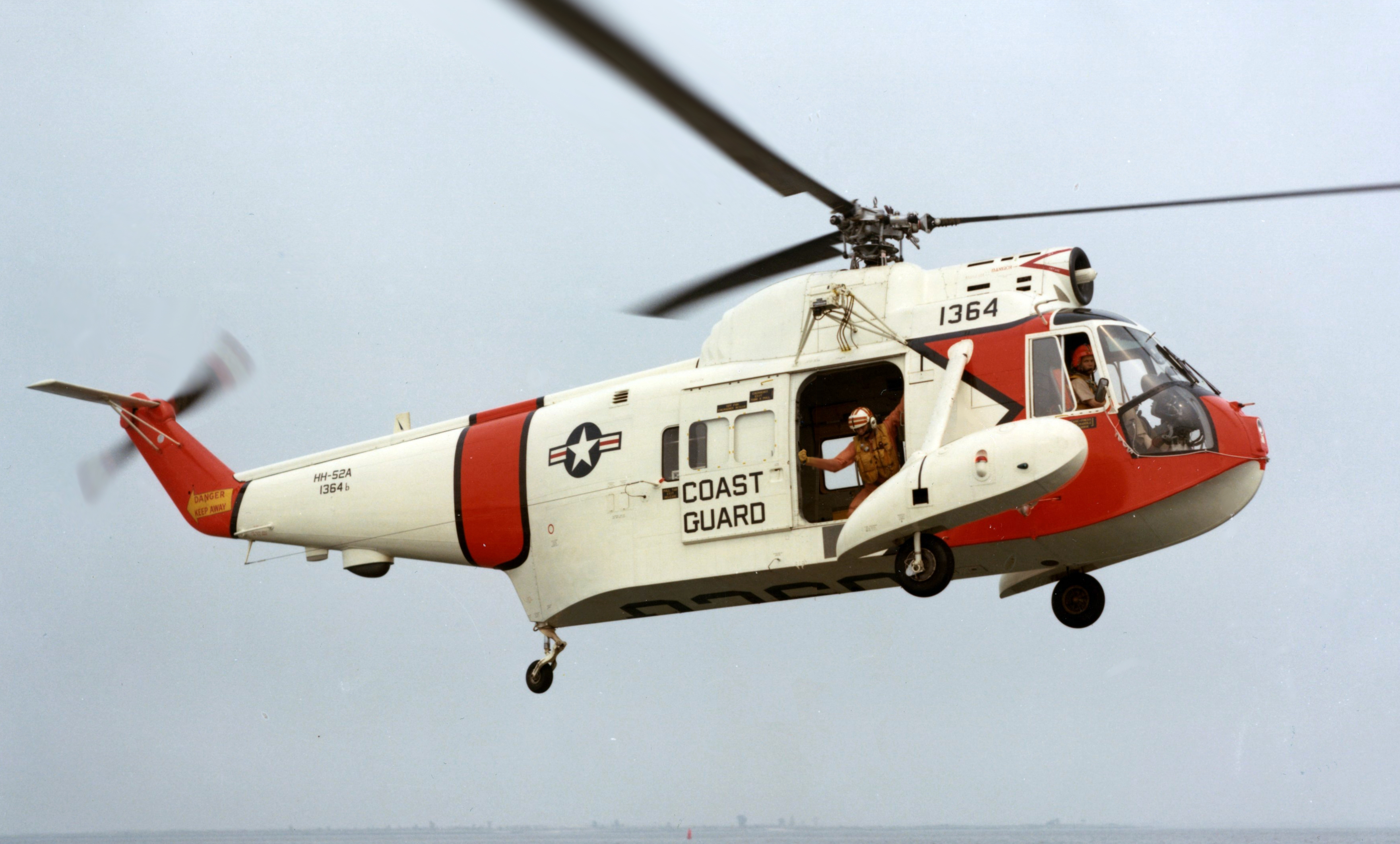
- A U.S. Coast Guard HH-52A Seaguard helicopter

General information
- Type: SAR/utility helicopter
- National origin: United States
- Manufacturer: Sikorsky Aircraft
- Status: Retired in 1989
- Primary user: United States Coast Guard
- Number built: 175

History
- Introduction date: 1961
- First flight: 14 May 1958

The Sikorsky HH-52 Seaguard (company designation S-62) is an early amphibious helicopter designed and produced by American helicopter manufacturer Sikorsky Aircraft. It was the first of the company's amphibious rotorcraft to fly and the United States Coast Guard's first turbine-powered helicopter and first amphibious helicopter.

The S-62 was originally developed as a commercial venture during the late 1950s. It combined the dynamic elements of the Sikorsky S-55 with a boat hull-shaped fuselage and a single lightweight turboshaft engine. The prototype S-62 conducted its maiden flight on 22 May 1958, powered by a single General Electric T58-GE-6 turboshaft engine. It underwent evaluation at the Naval Air Test Center in Patuxent River, Maryland, at Sikorsky's own expense as part of its effort to promote the S-62 to the United States Coast Guard (USCG).

The USCG would procure 99 S-62s, which it initially designated as the HU2S-1G Seaguard, and later redesignated as the HH-52A Seaguard. It was primarily operated by the USCG for air-sea rescue missions. Various other operators opted to procure the S-62 for their own purposes, from airliners to utility transporters, and foreign air services. It was widely used into the 1980s, when many operators elected to replace the type with newer rotorcraft. The HH-52 was withdrawn from USCG service during 1989 in favor of nonamphibious rotorcraft, such as the Eurocopter HH-65 Dolphin, which rely solely on the use of a winch from a low hover to conduct rescue operations.

== Development ==
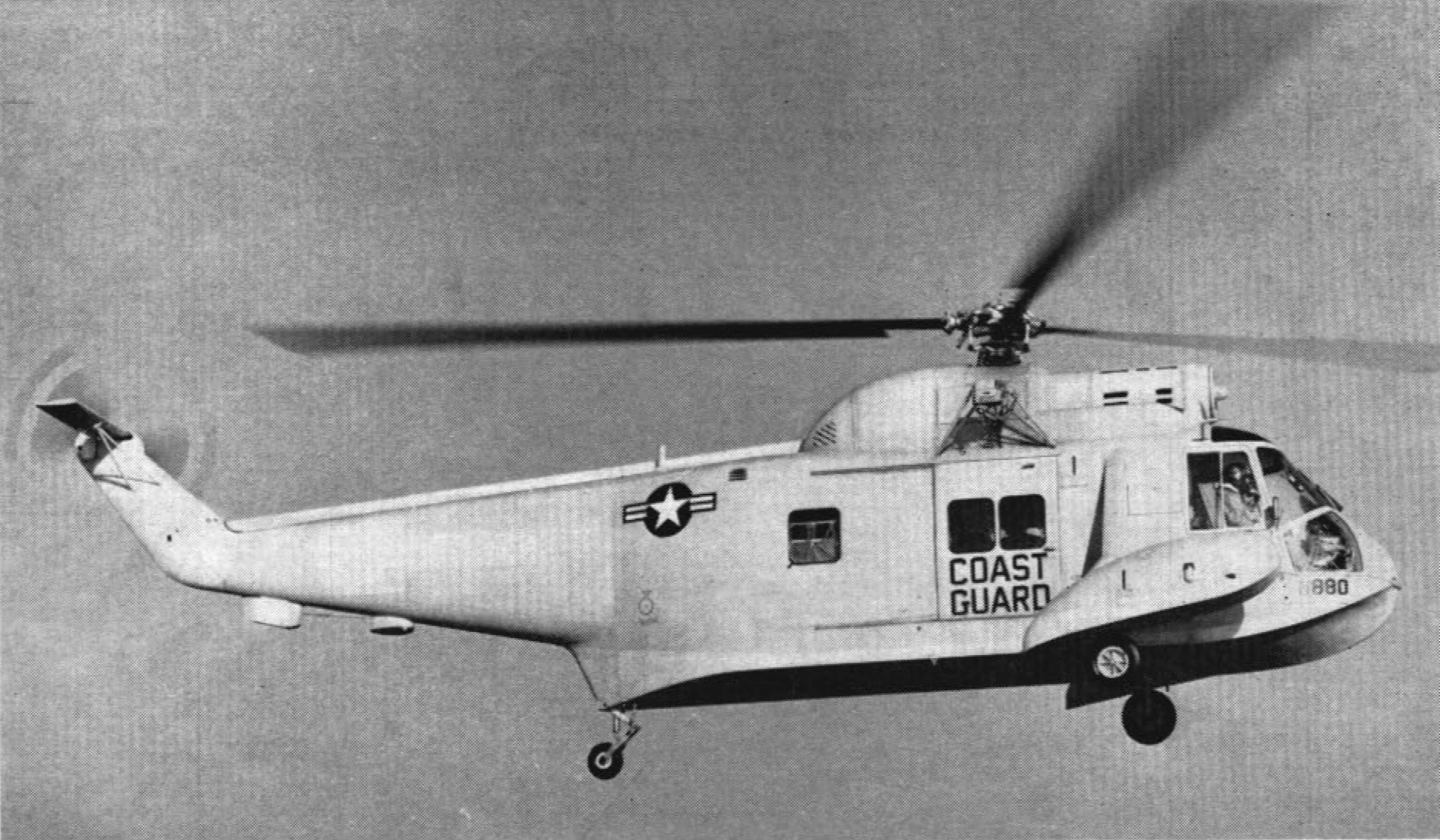
A Sikorsky S-62 prototype, circa 1962

Development of the S-62 was launched by Sikorsky during the late 1950s; the initiative was initially pursued as an independent commercial venture. In concept, the project combined the dynamic elements of the earlier Sikorsky S-55 with a boat hull-shaped fuselage and a single lightweight turboshaft engine. This was a relatively ambitious design for the era, being the first of Sikorsky's amphibious helicopters.

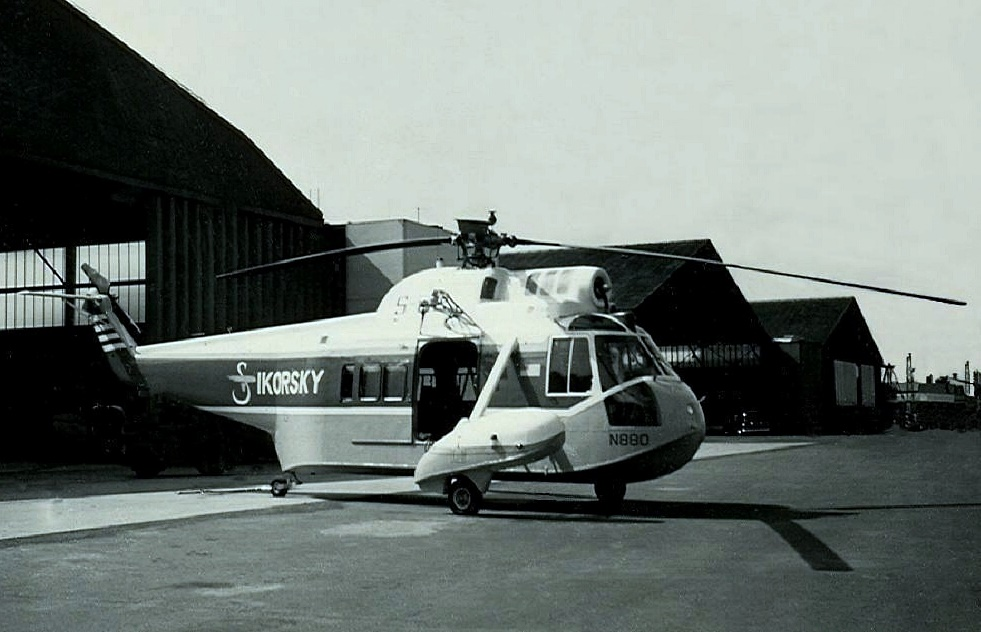
A S-62 Prototype, in Le Bourget Airport, June 1959

On 14 May 1958, the prototype S-62 performed its maiden flight; in doing so, it had beat its larger Sikorsky S-61 sibling into flight by almost a year. This prototype was powered by a single General Electric T58-GE-6 turboshaft that had been derated from 1,050 hp to 670 hp, powering identical main and tail rotors to those of the S-55.

At Sikorsky's own expense, it funded a "fly before you buy" test program at the Naval Air Test Center in Patuxent River, Maryland; the company actively promoted the type to the United States Coast Guard (USCG) in particular. The results of this test program was largely positive, confirming Sikorsky's performance claims and its suitability for the service. Accordingly, on 21 June 1962, Sikorsky was issued an initial production contract for the type. On 9 January 1963, the first of 99 production helicopters was delivered to the USCG. On 17 January 1969, the final example were delivered by the company.

== Design ==
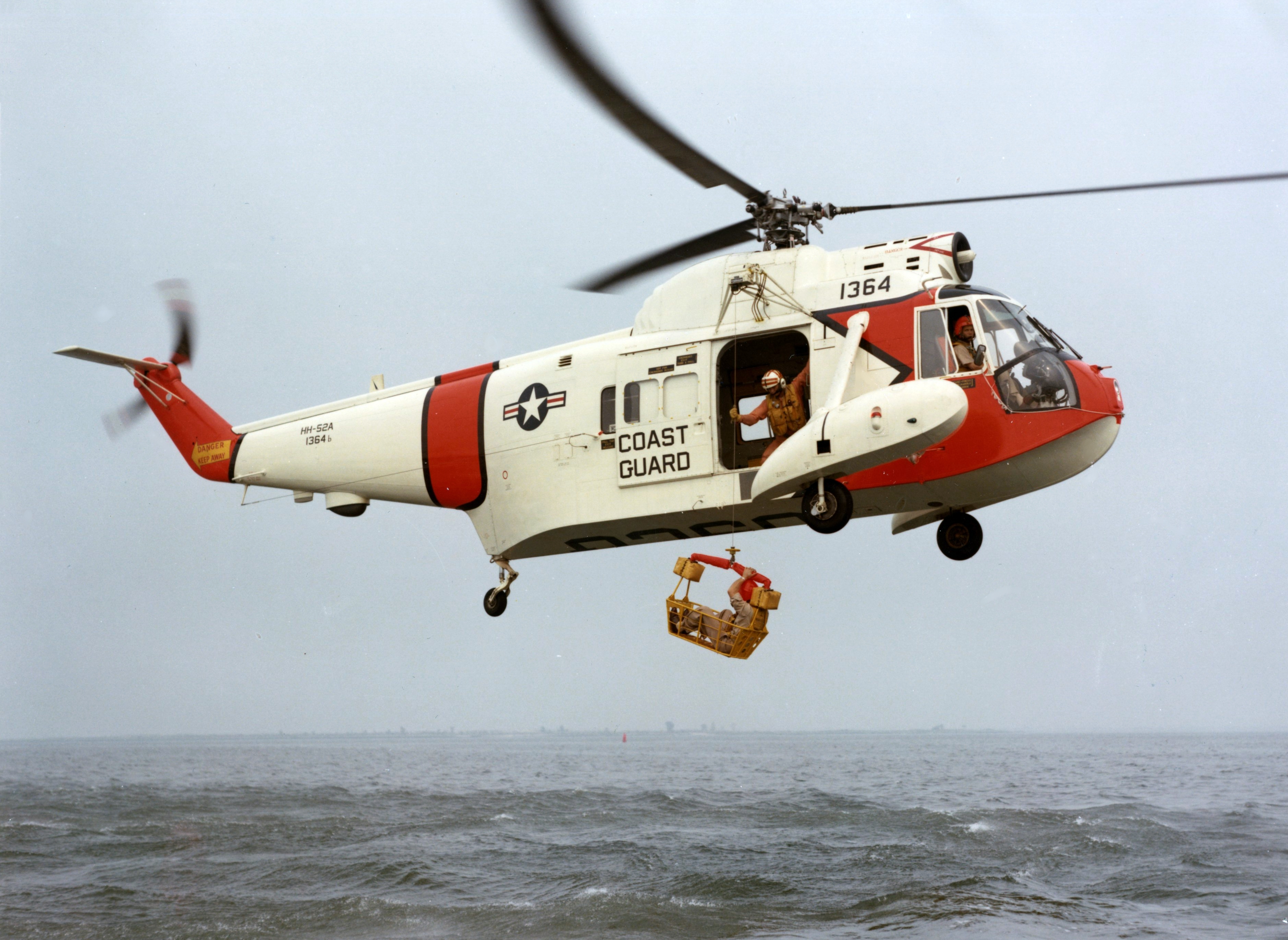
HH-52 Seaguard with rescue basket lowered

Perhaps the most prominent feature of the S-62 is its boat hull fuselage, which was more compact, but otherwise similar to the preceding Sikorsky S-61 (adopted by the US Navy as the SH-3 Sea King). This fuselage is watertight, facilitating landings on water and snow alike, and furnished with two outrigger floats that help the rotorcraft resist both pitching and rolling motions while on the water's surface. These outrigger floats also accommodated the landing gear, which was retractable. To maintain its position while on the water, it was able to deploy an anchor.

Although the S-62 bore little visual resemblance to the Sikorsky S-55, it used many of the same components. It was powered by a single General Electric T58-GE-8B turboshaft engine, capable to generating up to 1,250 hp (930 kW); it was a derated version of the T58-GE-10 powerplant used on the larger, twin-engined SH-3. The S-62 had sufficient power to carry up to 12 passengers, or six litters, along with a crew of three.

== Operational history ==
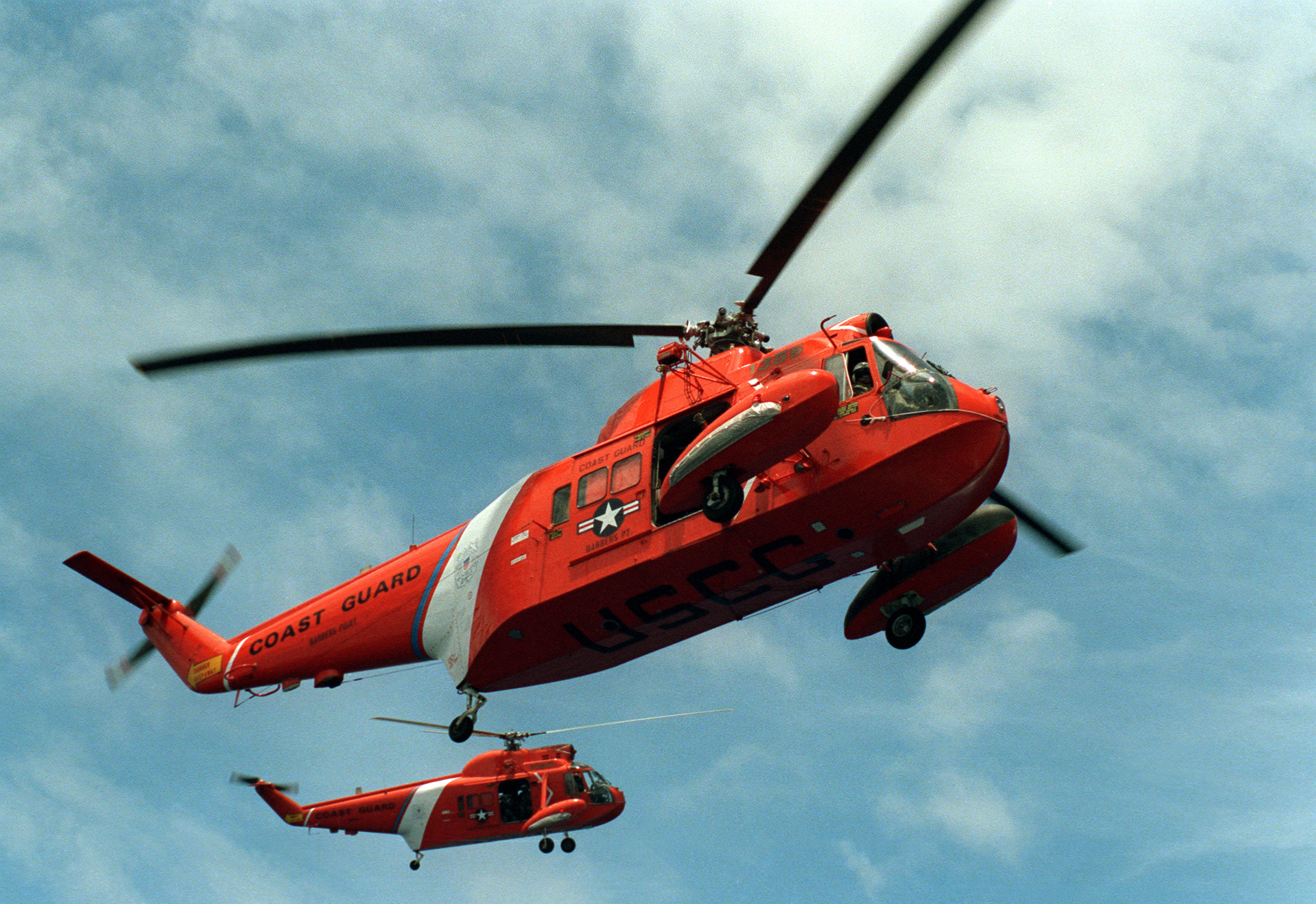
Two HH-52A helicopters in 1987

One prominent early use of the S-62 was with the operator San Francisco and Oakland Helicopter Airlines, one of the first helicopter airlines to operate without a federal subsidy, and the first to operate exclusively using turbine engine helicopters; the airline commenced passenger flights using a pair of two leased S-62s in June 1961, each of which being configured to carry up to 10 passengers. On 21 December of that year, rival operator Los Angeles Airways performed the first scheduled service using an American turbine-powered helicopter via a leased S-62. By June 1962, three S-62s were reportedly in operation for specialized transportation purposes, such as servicing offshore oil rigs in the Gulf of Mexico, with Petroleum Helicopters. Other early civilian operators included Okanagan Helicopters, which used its S-62s to supply remote radar installations, and the Canadian Department of Transport, which had the type fly resupply missions to its lighthouses.

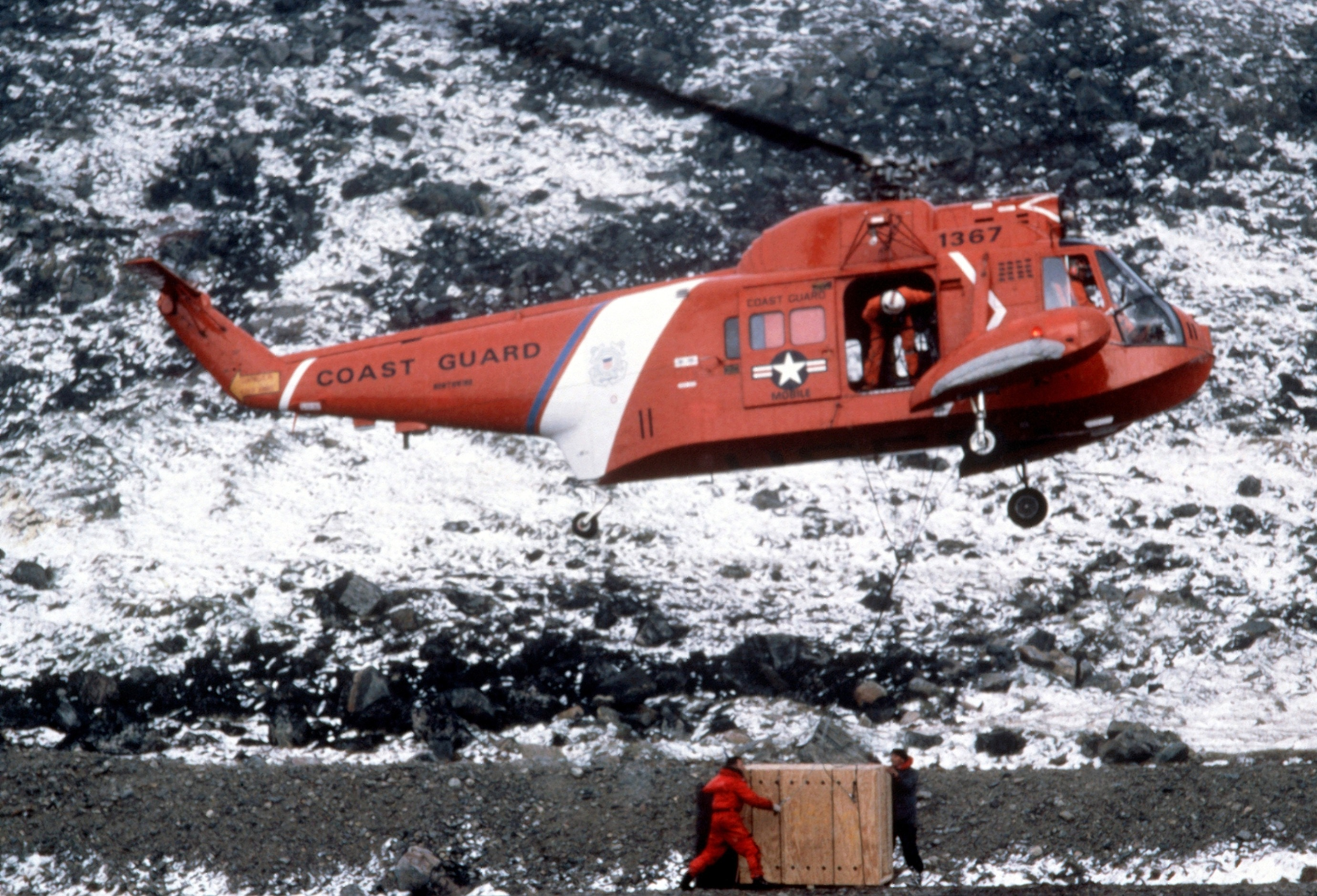
HH-52A, in 1986

A large fleet of 99 S-62s was purchased by the US Navy's Bureau of Aeronautics on behalf of the USCG, who operated the type primarily for search and rescue missions. It was initially designated HU2S-1G Seaguard, but was redesignated as the HH-52A Seaguard in 1962. The HH-52 was commonly dispatched aboard the USCG's larger cutters and icebreakers. The turbine-powered helicopter could carry greater payloads and fly faster than many preceding aircraft, such as the H-19 (S-55). Being designed to be amphibious, the installation of additional flotation gear was not required for over-water flights, and rescues could be conducted by simply landing on the water. Water pickups were considered to be quicker than hoisting survivors up to the helicopter.

Across its services life, the HH-52 fleet played an active role during various emergencies and other circumstances. During the aftermath of Hurricane Betsey in 1965, the type rescued 1,200 people. The HH-52 was periodically used to provide logistical support in Antarctica. One HH-52 was present for the foundering of the oil tanker Burmah Agate on 1 November 1979, facilitating in the rescue of personnel from the affected vessels.

The HH-52 fleet was active for a total of 26 years, during which it reportedly was responsible for saving in excess of 15,000 people from various forms of life-threatening situations. Having been eclipsed by newer rotorcraft, the final flight of a HH-52 took place on 12 September 1989, after which the type was officially withdrawn from USCG service. It was primarily replaced by the Eurocopter HH-65 Dolphin, a conventional nonamphibious helicopter.

== Variants ==
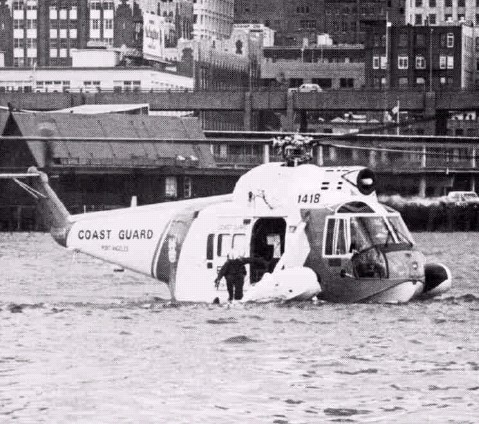
U.S. Coast Guard HH-52A floating in Seattle in 1979

S-62
Prototype. First flew on 14 May 1958.
S-62A
Amphibious transport helicopter, powered by a General Electric CT58-110-1 turboshaft engine, with accommodation for up to 11 passengers. The S-62A was the first production version.
S-62B
One S-62 was fitted with the main rotor system of the Sikorsky S-58.
S-62C
Company designation of the HH-52A Seaguard.
S-62J
Produced under license in Japan by Mitsubishi.
HU2S-1G
Original designation of the HH-52A Seaguard. Redesignated HH-52A in 1962.
HH-52A Seaguard
Search and rescue helicopter for the United States Coast Guard; 99 built including 1 transferred to Iceland.

== Operators ==
=== Military/Government ===
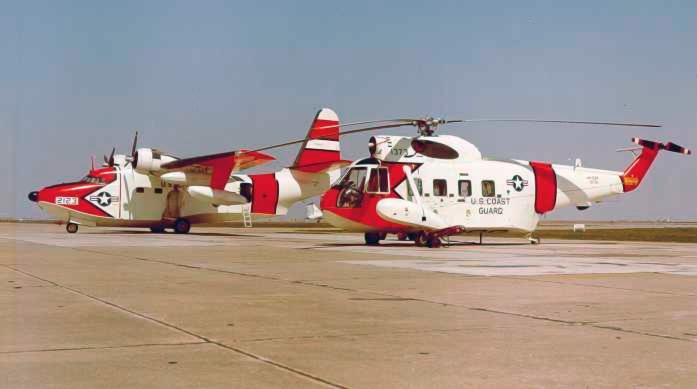
A Coast Guard Grumman HU-16 Albatross and a Sikorsky HH-52A in March 1964

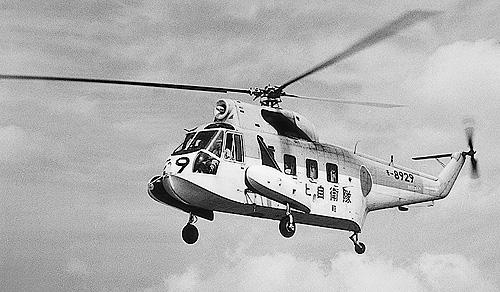
A S-62J of the Japan Maritime Self-Defense Force

Japan

- Japan Air Self Defense Force
- Japan Maritime Self Defense Force
- Japan Coast Guard

Philippines

- Philippine Air Force

United States

- United States Coast Guard

Iceland

- Icelandic Coast Guard

Thailand

- Royal Thai Police

=== Civilian ===
Qatar

- Gulf Helicopters

United States

- SFO Helicopter Airlines

== Aircraft on display ==
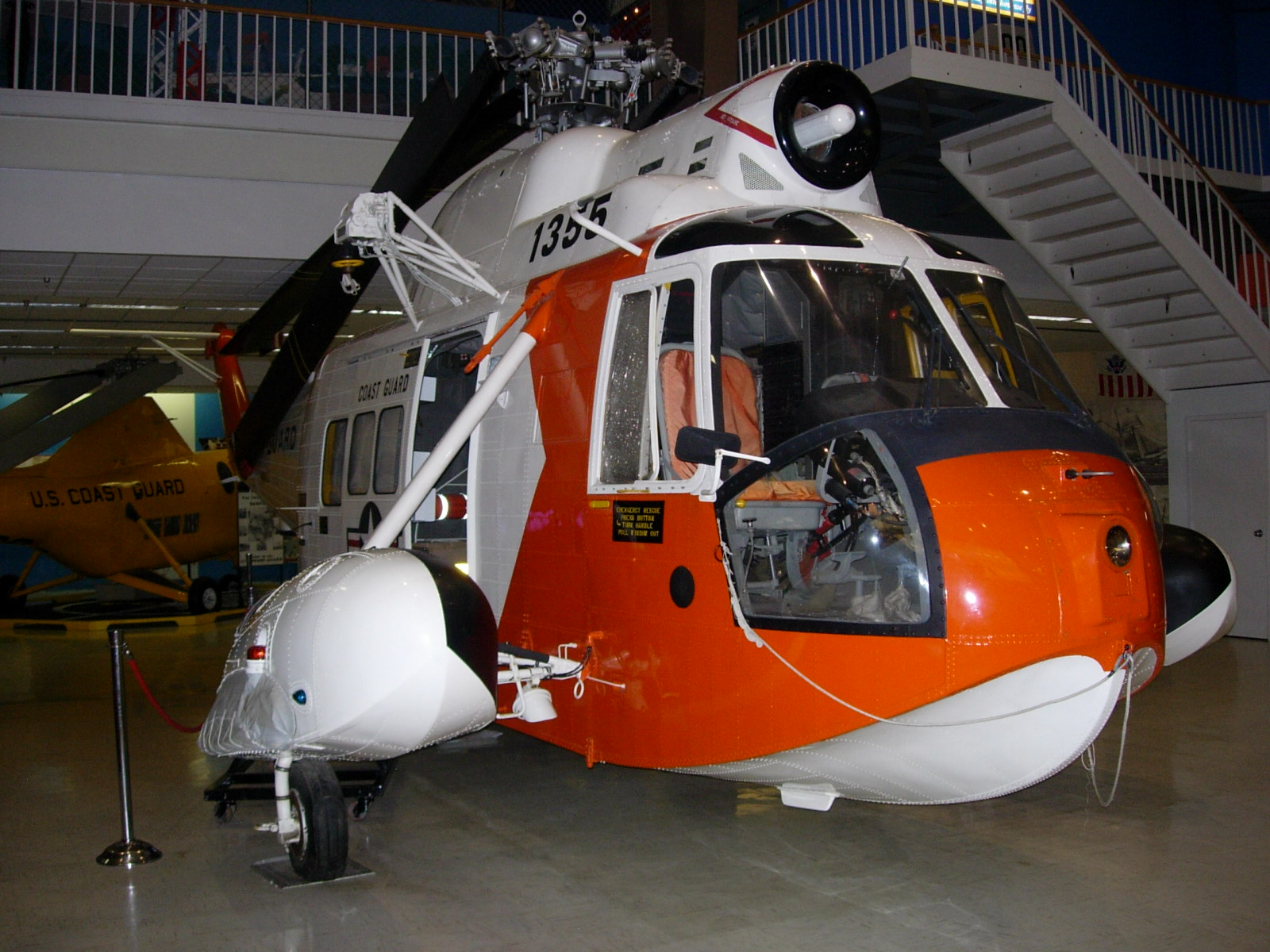
HH-52A Seaguard 'USCG1355' at the National Museum of Naval Aviation in Pensacola, Florida

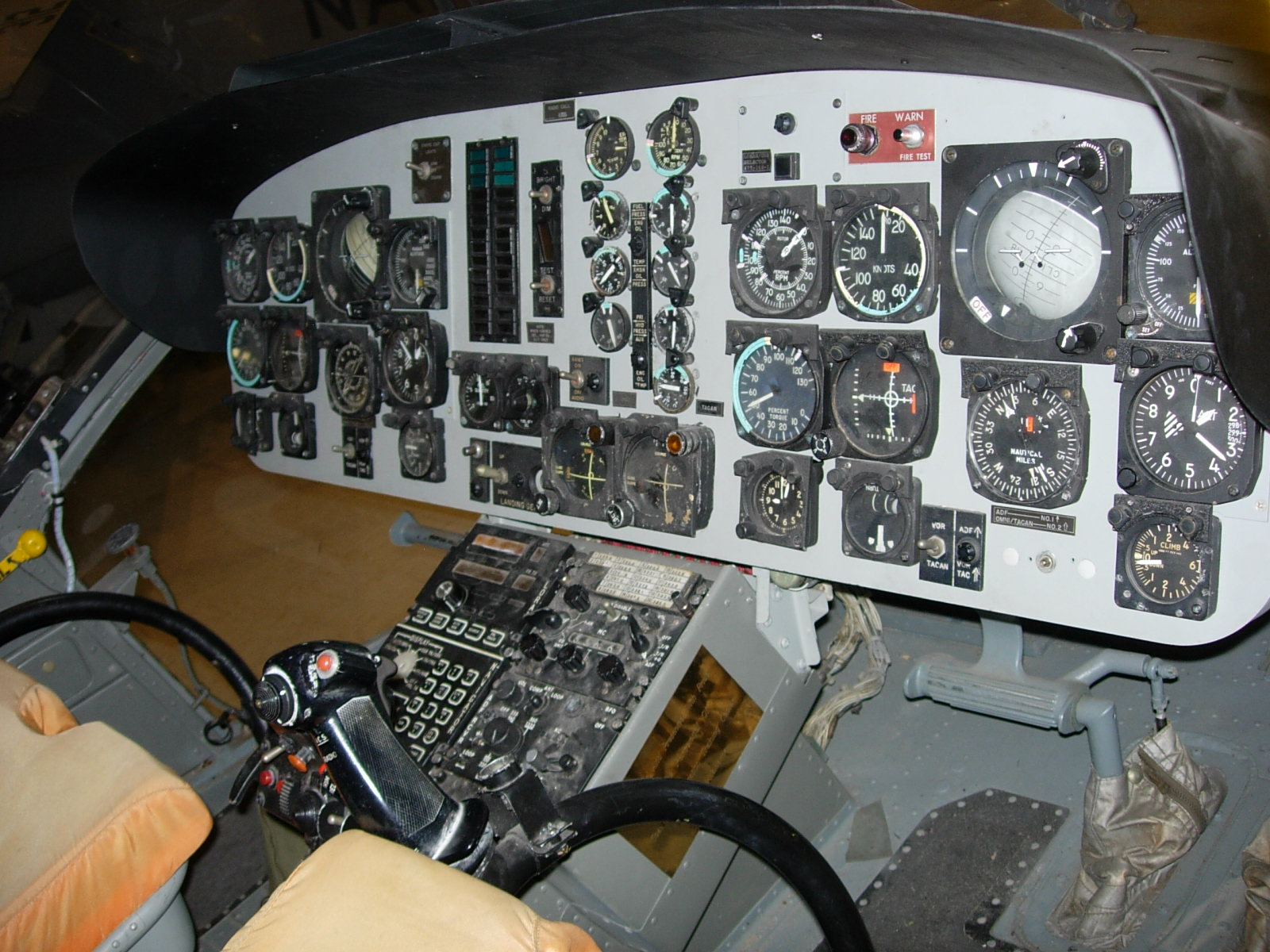
Cockpit of HH-52A Seaguard 'USCG1355' at the National Museum of Naval Aviation in Pensacola

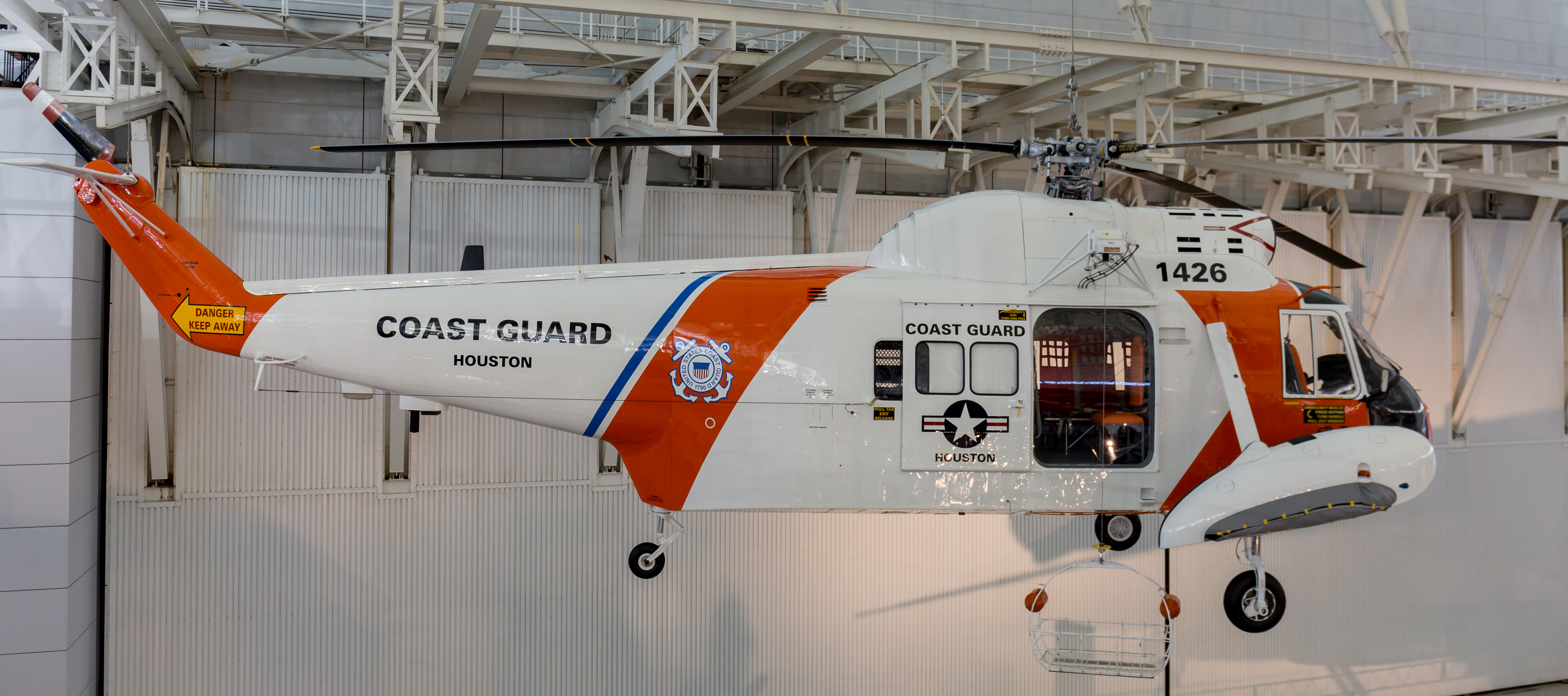
An HH-52 Seaguard on display at the Udvar-Hazy Center

=== Japan ===
- 53-4774 - S-62J on static display at Hamamatsu Air Park, Hamamatsu AB, Shizuoka.

=== Philippines ===
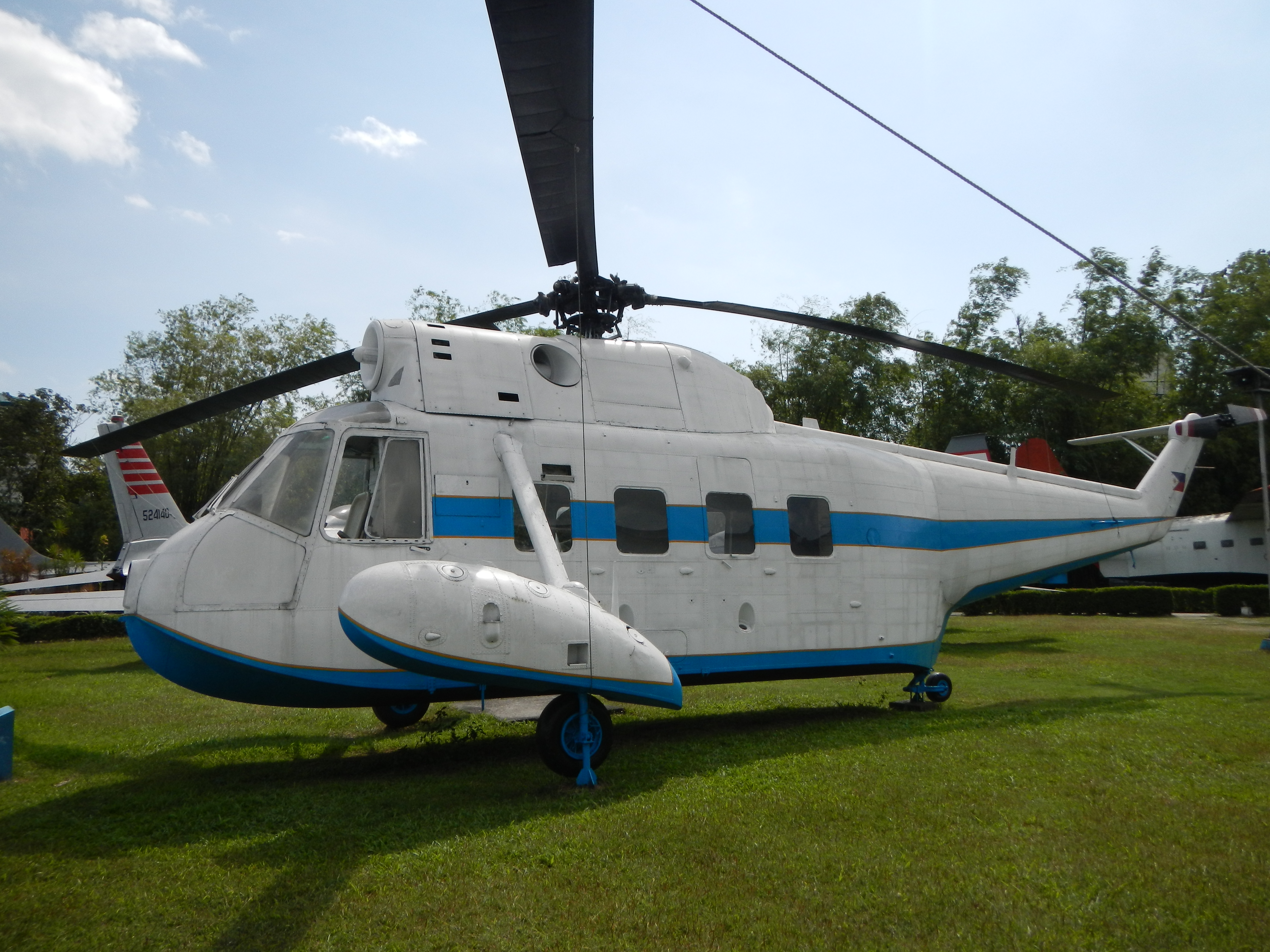
An HH-52 Seaguard on static display at the Philippine Air Force Aerospace Museum in Manila

- 62018 – On static display at the Philippine Air Force Museum in Pasay, Manila.

=== South Africa ===
- 62-062 – S-62A on static display in Strand, Western Cape. It has been painted to resemble SH-3 bureau number 150142.

=== Thailand ===
- On static display at the Thai Police Aviation Division operations base in Bangkok, Thailand.

=== United States ===
- USCG 1355 – HH-52A on static display at the National Naval Aviation Museum at Naval Air Station Pensacola in Pensacola, Florida.
- USCG 1357 – At Dillingham Airfield in Mokulēia, Hawaii.
- USCG 1370 – HH-52A on static display at Freedom Park in Omaha, Nebraska.
- USCG 1375 – HH-52A in storage at Yanks Air Museum in Chino, California.
- USCG 1378 – HH-52A on static display at the Battleship Memorial Park in Mobile, Alabama.
- USCG 1383 – HH-52A on static display at the American Helicopter Museum & Education Center in West Chester, Pennsylvania.
- USCG 1384 – On static display at CGAS Elizabeth City in Elizabeth City, North Carolina.
- USCG 1389 – At Delgado Community College in New Orleans, Louisiana.
- USCG 1394 – HH-52A on display at the Mid-Atlantic Air Museum in Reading, Pennsylvania.
- USCG 1395 – HH-52A on static display at the Classic Rotors Museum in Ramona, California.
- USCG 1398 – HH-52A in storage at CGAS Elizabeth City in Elizabeth City, North Carolina. It was previously located at Black River Technical College in Pocahontas, Arkansas.
- USCG 1397 – At Amarillo College in Amarillo, Texas.
- USCG 1415 – HH-52A on static display at the Museum of Flight in Seattle, Washington.
- USCG 1416 – HH-52A at Broward College in Pembroke Pines, Florida.
- USCG 1423 – HH-52A cockpit section only on static display at the National Museum of Naval Aviation at Naval Air Station Pensacola in Pensacola, Florida.
- USCG 1426 – HH-52A on static display at the Steven F. Udvar-Hazy Center of the National Air and Space Museum in Chantilly, Virginia. It was restored by the Coast Guard Aviation Association and went on display on 14 April 2016.
- USCG 1428 – HH-52A on static display at the New England Air Museum in Windsor Locks, Connecticut.
- USCG 1429 – HH-52A on static display at the Intrepid Sea, Air & Space Museum in New York, New York.
- USCG 1450 – HH-52A on static display at the Pima Air & Space Museum in Tucson, Arizona
- USCG 1455 – HH-52A on static display at the Aviation Hall of Fame and Museum of New Jersey in Teterboro, New Jersey.
- USCG 1459 – HH-52A in storage at the Naval Air Station Glenview Museum in Glenview, Illinois. It was previously on display at the Museum of Science and Industry.
- USCG 1462 – HH-52A on static display at the Naval Air Station Wildwood Aviation Museum in Erma, New Jersey.
- USCG 1466 – HH-52A on static display at the Selfridge Military Air Museum at Selfridge Air National Guard Base in Mount Clemens, Michigan.

== Specifications (HH-52A) ==

Data from Jane's All The World's Aircraft 1969–70

General characteristics

- Crew: 3
- Capacity: 3,127 lb (1,418 kg) payload
- Length: 44 ft 6.5 in (13.576 m)
- Height: 16 ft 0 in (4.88 m)
- Empty weight: 5,083 lb (2,306 kg)
- Max takeoff weight: 8,300 lb (3,765 kg)
- Powerplant: 1 × General Electric T58-GE-8 turboshaft engine, 730 shp (540 kW) (de-rated from 1,250 shp (932 kW))
- Main rotor diameter: 53 ft (16 m)
- Main rotor area: 2,206 sq ft (204.9 m^{2})
- Blade section: - NACA 0012

Performance

- Maximum speed: 95 kn (109 mph, 176 km/h) at sea level
- Cruise speed: 85 kn (98 mph, 157 km/h)
- Range: 412 nmi (474 mi, 763 km)
- Service ceiling: 11,200 ft (3,400 m)
- Rate of climb: 1,080 ft/min (5.5 m/s)

== See also ==
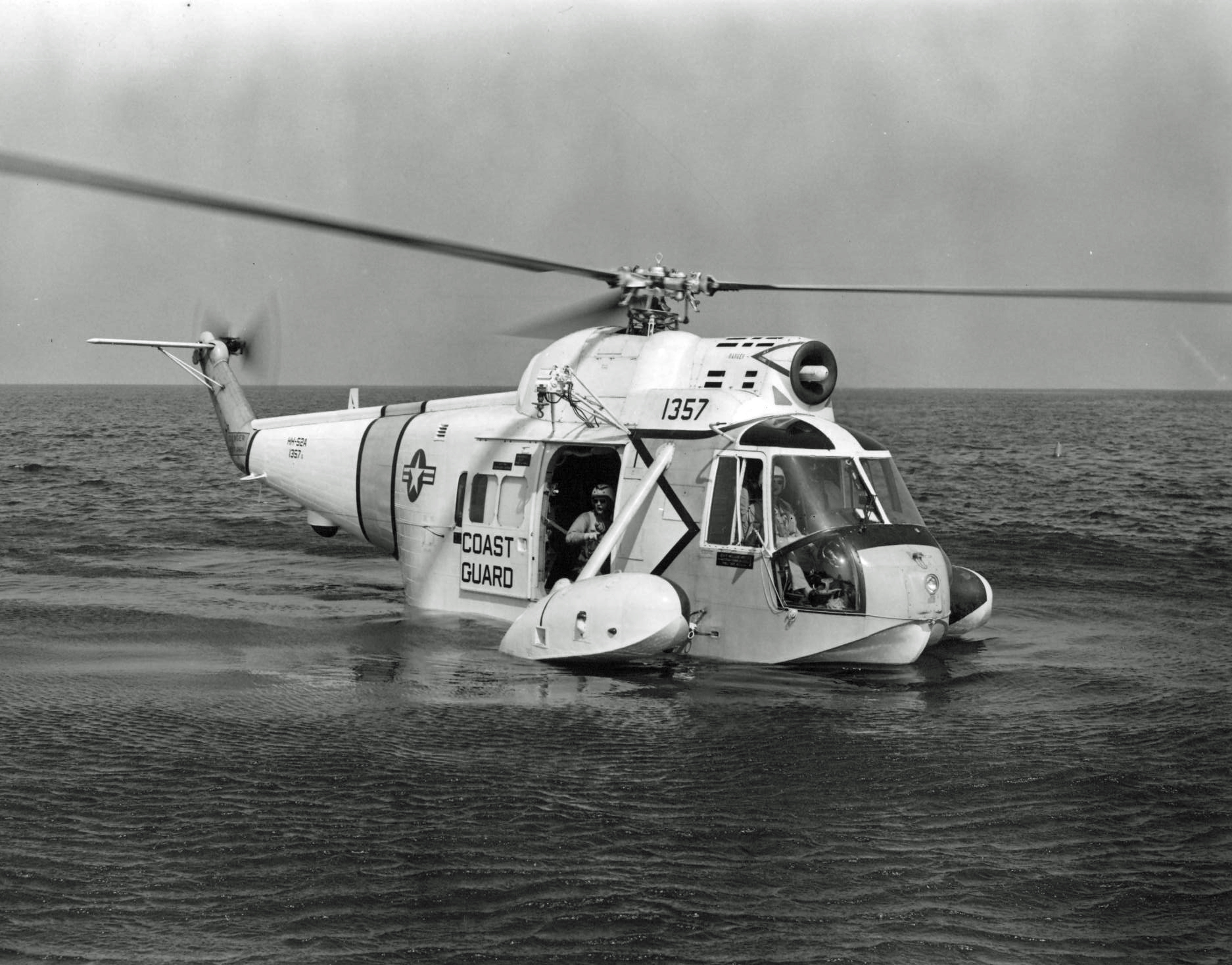
HH-52A in a lake, 1964

Related development

- Sikorsky SH-3 Sea King
- Sikorsky HH-3F Pelican
- Sikorsky S-55

Related lists

- List of military aircraft of the United States
- List of rotorcraft
