= Blue Magpie (ship) =

Coordinates: 44.6°N 124.08°W

History
- Name: Blue Magpie
- Owner: Jinyu Shipping Company
- Port of registry: Panama
- Builder: Shin Kurushima Dockyard, Hiroshima, Japan
- Launched: 1982
- Identification: IMO number: 8217673
- Fate: Wrecked at Newport, Oregon, 19 November 1983

General characteristics
- Type: Cargo ship
- Tonnage: 3,801 GT; 7,060 DWT
- Length: 110 metres (360 ft)
- Crew: 19

Blue Magpie was a 105-meter Japanese freighter owned by Jinyu Shipping Company. She was registered at Panama, and chartered to a Dutch corporation. In November 1983, she ran aground at Newport, Oregon, spilling 265,000 litres of fuel oil into the coastal waters.

== Incident ==
On 19 November 1983, Blue Magpie was en route to Vancouver, to pick up lumber, after unloading a cargo of Salvadoran coffee in Long Beach, California. Caught up in a storm, the ship attempted to take shelter in Yaquina Bay, but smashed into a coastal rock jetty and broke apart, causing a major oil spill. The vessel's nineteen South Korean crew members were unharmed, and were retrieved from the wreck by helicopter.

It transpired from Coast Guard radio logs that the ship's captain, Kim Gap Bong, had been repeatedly warned of the danger of trying to enter the harbor. The captain, however, was insistent that he had to get out of the storm. Blue Magpie's chief officer, Kang Tae Jung, later explained that their situation had been desperate. The ship had spent nine hours on a violent sea, and was in serious danger of capsizing.

== Oil spill ==
An estimated 70,000 gallons (265,000 litres) of Bunker C oil leaked from the wreckage, although most of it was swept out to sea by the wind. The oil that did wash ashore, however, posed a significant threat to the local wildlife. Brown pelicans and other coastal birds were found on the beaches covered in oil, and despite the best efforts of volunteers, over 250 birds did not survive their ordeal. Other marine species, such as razor clams, were also thought to be in danger.

A Coast Guard Strike Team, specially trained to manage oil spills, was flown in from California. A containment boom was placed around the ship, and some of the oil was vacuumed off the beach. The cost of the cleanup was at least $140,000, and oil continued to wash up for several weeks, up to 100 miles from the crash site.

A study into the long-term effect of the oil spill on bird numbers found that certain species, in particular the American coot, had shown a significant decline. However, this could have been due to external factors, such as that year's occurrence of El Niño, so the overall impact of the spill was deemed impossible to determine.
