= List of shipwrecks in January 1852 =

The list of shipwrecks in January 1852 includes ships sunk, foundered, wrecked, grounded, or otherwise lost during January 1852.

== 1 January ==
List of shipwrecks: 1 January 1852
| Ship | State | Description |
|---|---|---|
| Adelina | France | The ship sank west of Les Sables d'Olonne, Vendée. Her crew were rescued. |
| Concord | United Kingdom | The brig ran aground on the Corton Sand, in the North Sea off the coast of Suffolk. She was on a voyage from Hartlepool, County Durham to London. She was refloated. |
| Feronia | United Kingdom | The ship sprang a leak and sank in St. Bride's Bay. Her crew were rescued. She was on a voyage from Llanelly, Glamorgan to Dublin. |
| Medium | (United Kingdom of Great Britain and Ireland) British North America | The ship was abandoned in the Atlantic Ocean. Her crew were rescued. She was on a voyage from Newport, Rhode Island to City Point, Virginia, United States. |

== 2 January ==
List of shipwrecks: 2 January 1852
| Ship | State | Description |
|---|---|---|
| Argus | United Kingdom | The ship ran aground in the Elbe at Grauerort. She was on a voyage from Hull, Yorkshire to Hamburg. She was refloated and taken in to Hamburg. |
| Diana | United Kingdom | The brig ran aground on the Barnard Sand, in the North Sea off the coast of Norfolk. She was on a voyage from Dundee and/or Montrose, Forfarshire to Malta. She was refloated and resumed her voyage. |
| Little John | United Kingdom | The ship departed from London for Sunderland, County Durham. No further trace, presumed foundered with the loss of all hands. |
| Margaretha | Kingdom of Hanover | The ship capsized in the Jahde. Her crew were rescued. She was on a voyage from an English port to Varel. |
| Victoria | United Kingdom | The brig was driven ashore at Margate, Kent. She was refloated. |

== 3 January ==
List of shipwrecks: January 1852
| Ship | State | Description |
|---|---|---|
| RMS Amazon | United Kingdom | RMS Amazon. The paddle steamer caught fire, exploded and sank in the Bay of Biscay 110 nautical miles (200 km) west south west of the Isles of Scilly with the loss of her Captain and 105 to 115 lives. There were 59 survivors. They were rescued by Gertruida, Helleschina (both (Netherlands) the steamship Harbinger, and Marsden (both United Kingdom). RMS Amazon was on a voyage from Southampton, Hampshire to the West Indies. |
| Delaware | United States | The brig was run into by Naomi (United Kingdom) and sank off Charleston, South Carolina. Her crew were rescued. She was on a voyage from Savannah, Georgia to Philadelphia, Pennsylvania. |
| Earl of Glasgow | United Kingdom | The smack was driven ashore and sank on Walney Island, Lancashire. Her crew were rescued. She was on a voyage from Liverpool to Mulroy, Inverness-shire. |
| Miriam | United Kingdom | The schooner was driven ashore at Abererch, Caernarfonshire. She was refloated on 12 February and taken in to Pwllheli, Caernarfonshire. |
| Rahbid | United Kingdom | The paddle tug was wrecked near Arranman's Barrels, on the west coast of Scotland with the loss of five of her six crew. She was on a voyage from North Shields, County Durham to the Clyde. |
| Spirit | United Kingdom | The ship ran aground at Zakynthos, Greece. She was on a voyage from Zakynthos to Messina, Sicily. |

== 4 January ==
List of shipwrecks: 4 January 1852
| Ship | State | Description |
|---|---|---|
| Alfred Henry | (United Kingdom of Great Britain and Ireland) British North America | The brig struck the Outer Glaves, in the Atlantic Ocean off the coast of Massachusetts and foundered with the loss of all hands. She was on a voyage from Sydney, Nova Scotia to Boston, Massachusetts, United States. |
| Barbara | United Kingdom | The ship sank at Portsoy, Aberdeenshire. |
| Diddlesford | United Kingdom | The sloop was discovered abandoned on the Newcombe Sand, in the North Sea off the coast of Suffolk. She was refloated and taken in to Lowestoft, Suffolk. |
| Endeavour | United Kingdom | The ship was driven ashore and wrecked at "Peak", Yorkshire. |
| Gustave | France | The ship was wrecked on the Boisbruit Rock, off "Saint Gillies". Her crew were rescued. |
| Helen | United Kingdom | The barque ran aground on the Brazil Bank, in the Irish Sea off the coast of Lancashire. She was on a voyage from Demerara, British Guiana to Liverpool, Lancashire. She was refloated the next day and taken in to Liverpool. |
| Joseph | United Kingdom | The ship was driven ashore and wrecked at Hopeman, Morayshire with the loss of a crew member. She was on a voyage from Ballachulish, Inverness-shire to Lossiemouth, Morayshire. |
| Myriam | United Kingdom | The schooner was driven ashore at Abererch, Caernarfonshire. |
| Peerless | United Kingdom | The schooner was driven ashore and wrecked on Nantasket Beach, Massachusetts, United States. Her crew were rescued. She was on a voyage from New York, United States to Saint John, New Brunswick, British North America. |
| Town of Wexford | United Kingdom | The paddle steamer was wrecked at Trefadog, Anglesey. Forty-three of the 47 people on board were rescued by the Holyhead Lifeboat. The remaining four reached shore in their boat. She was on a voyage from Wexford to Liverpool. |

== 5 January ==
List of shipwrecks: 5 January 1852
| Ship | State | Description |
|---|---|---|
| Dove | United Kingdom | The brig was severely damaged by fire at Cardiff, Glamorgan. |
| Edward Kenney | United Kingdom | The brig ran aground on the Newcombe Sand, in the North Sea off the coast of Norfolk and was abandoned. Her crew were rescued by the yawl Pakefield (United Kingdom. Edward Kenney was on a voyage from Newcastle upon Tyne, Northumberland to Venice, Kingdom of Lombardy–Venetia. |
| Four Sisters | United Kingdom | The ship was driven ashore and severely damaged at Allonby, Cumberland. She was on a voyage from Barrow-in-Furness, Lancashire to Maryport, Cumberland. |
| Friedrich | Flag unknown | The ship struck a sunken rock and sank in the Danube at Tulcea, Ottoman Empire. She was on a voyage from Brăila, Ottoman Empire to Queenstown, County Cork, United Kingdom. |
| George | United Kingdom | The sloop ran aground on the Newcombe Sand and sank. Her crew were rescued. |
| Immanuel | Hamburg | The ship was driven ashore on "Hagenholm". She was on a voyage from Hamburg to Buenos Aires, Argentina. She was refloated on 8 January and taken in to Cuxhaven. |
| Industry | United Kingdom | The ship was damaged by fire at Dublin. |
| James Carmichael | United Kingdom | The ship foundered in the Mediterranean Sea 60 nautical miles (110 km) off Malta. Her crew were rescued by Queen of Scotland (United Kingdom). James Carmichael was on a voyage from Cagliari, Sardinia to London. |
| L'Avengeur | United Kingdom | The ship was driven ashore at Flimby, Cumberland. She was on a voyage from Belfast, County Antrim to Maryport. |
| Rhein | Netherlands | The ship was driven ashore in Corson Inlet. All on board survived. She was on a voyage from Rotterdam, South Holland to New York, United States. She was driven further up the beach in late March and salvage was abandoned. |
| Roxelane | France | The ship was wrecked 12 nautical miles (22 km) north of Lisbon, Portugal. Her crew were rescued. |
| Scotia | United Kingdom | The ship departed from Macduff, Aberdeenshire for London. No further trace, presumed foundered with the loss of all hands. |
| Thomas and Mary | United Kingdom | The schooner ran aground on the Woolseners Sandbank, in the English Channel off the coast of Hampshire. She was on a voyage from Milford Haven, Pembrokeshire to Langstone, Hampshire. She was refloated and beached. |

== 6 January ==
List of shipwrecks: 6 January 1852
| Ship | State | Description |
|---|---|---|
| Cariboo | United Kingdom | The ship struck the pier at Whitehaven, Cumberland and was damaged. She was on a voyage from Kingstown, County Dublin to Whitehaven. |
| Caroline | (United Kingdom of Great Britain and Ireland) British North America | The schooner was driven ashore and wrecked at Sandy Neck, Massachusetts, United States. |
| Commerce | United Kingdom | The brig sank in the North Sea off North Foreland, Kent. Her crew were rescued by Mary's Adventure (United Kingdom). Commerce was on a voyage from Sunderland, County Durham, to Newhaven, Sussex. |
| Duni | Sweden | The ship was driven ashore and severely damaged near Bolton. She was on a voyage from Gothenburg to Algiers, Algeria. She had been refloated by 10 January. |
| Koning Willem | Netherlands | The ship was driven ashore and wrecked on Vlieland, Friesland. She was on a voyage from Surinam to Amsterdam, North Holland. |
| Lord Durham | United Kingdom | The tug struck the pier at Sunderland and sank. Her crew survived. |
| Margaret | United Kingdom | The ship ran aground at the mouth of the River Tay and was severely damaged. |
| Najaden | Norway | The ship was driven ashore at "Verlen", near Moss. She was refloated on 31 January. |

== 7 January ==
List of shipwrecks: January 1852
| Ship | State | Description |
|---|---|---|
| Amicitia | United Kingdom | The tug suffered a boiler explosion and sank at Sunderland, County Durham. Her crew were rescued. |
| Anna Margaretha | Kingdom of Hanover | The ship was driven ashore and sank at Burntisland, Fife, United Kingdom. Her crew were rescued. |
| Aurora | United Kingdom | The brig was driven ashore at Londonderry. She was later refloated. |
| Boulonnais | France | The ship was lost in Tampico Bay. Her crew were rescued. |
| Columbus | United Kingdom | The full-rigged ship was driven ashore and wrecked at Waterford with the loss of twelve of the 32 people on board. She was on a voyage from New Orleans, Louisiana, United States to Liverpool, Lancashire. |
| Horsford | United Kingdom | The ship was damaged by fire at Belfast, County Antrim. |
| Jeune Emile | France | The ship was driven ashore at Saltfleet, Lincolnshire, United Kingdom. She was on a voyage from Dunkirk, Nord to King's Lynn, Norfolk, United Kingdom. She was refloated and taken in to Wainfleet, Lincolnshire. |
| Lochinver | United Kingdom | The ship was driven ashore and damaged at South Shields, County Durham. She was refloated. |
| Magdalene Christine | Norway | The ship was lost on the Jedderen with the loss of all but two of her crew. She was on a voyage from Newcastle upon Tyne, Northumberland, United Kingdom to Bergen. |
| Ormi | (Russian Empire) Grand Duchy of Finland | The ship rang aground and was wrecked at Gothenburg, Sweden. |

== 8 January ==
List of shipwrecks: 8 January 1852
| Ship | State | Description |
|---|---|---|
| Acorn | United Kingdom | The ship was driven ashore at Maryport, Cumberland. She was later refloated and taken in to Maryport. |
| Alexander | United Kingdom | The sloop was driven ashore at Bowmore, Islay. She was refloated on 14 January. |
| Anna | Russia | The brig was driven ashore and wrecked near the Inishowen Lighthouse, County Donegal, United Kingdom with some loss of life. |
| Ark | United Kingdom | The collier was abandoned off Hartlepool, County Durham. Her crew were rescued by a French vessel. She was on a voyage from South Shields, County Durham to London. |
| Briton | United Kingdom | The paddle steamer was driven ashore and damaged at Stranraer, Wigtownshire. |
| Elizabeth | United Kingdom | The ship was wrecked at the mouth of Loch Mangar with the loss of all but a passenger. She was on a voyage from "Ansay" to Greenock, Renfrewshire. |
| Herman | Netherlands | The galiot was wrecked in Lough Foyle. She was on a voyage from Antwerp, Belgium to Londonderry, United Kingdom. |
| Jane and Sarah, or Sarah and Anne | United Kingdom | The smack was driven ashore at Hoylake, Cheshire with the loss of two of her three crew. She was on a voyage from Wicklow to Chester, Cheshire. |
| Lord Warriston | United Kingdom | The ship was driven ashore and severely damaged on Ailsa Craig. She was on a voyage from Liverpool, Lancashire to Mobile, Alabama, United States. She was refloated on 10 February and taken in to Ardrossan, Ayrshire. |
| Paragon | United Kingdom | The full-rigged ship was driven ashore at Bowmore. |
| Robert | United Kingdom | The ship was driven ashore at Allonby, Cumberland. |
| True Briton | United Kingdom | The ship was driven ashore at Stranraer. |
| Victoire | France | The ship was wrecked at "Les Euens". She was on a voyage from Cardiff, Glamorgan, United Kingdom to Nantes, Loire-Inférieure. |
| Wellington | United Kingdom | The ship was driven ashore at Skinburness, Cumberland. She was on a voyage from Dublin to Maryport. |

== 9 January ==
List of shipwrecks: 9 January 1852
| Ship | State | Description |
|---|---|---|
| Albion | United Kingdom | The ship struck the quayside and sank at Freefield, Shetland Islands. She was refloated on 27 January and taken in to Lerwick for repairs. |
| Dee | United Kingdom | The ship was driven ashore at Beaumaris, Anglesey. |
| Fisher | United Kingdom | The ship was wrecked off the mouth of the River Spey. |
| Henry William, or William Henry | United Kingdom | The ship was driven ashore and wrecked at Bridlington, Yorkshire. Her crew were rescued. She was on a voyage from Stockton-on-Tees, County Durham to London. She had broken up by 12 January. |
| Janet Moore | United Kingdom | The ship was driven ashore at Granton, Lothian. She was on a voyage from Clackmannan to Arbroath, Forfarshire. She was refloated and taken in to Leith, Lothian. |
| Lord Algernon | United Kingdom | The ship was driven ashore and wrecked at Whitehaven, Cumberland. Her crew were rescued. She was on a voyage from Liverpool, Lancashire to Dublin. |
| Lyra | United Kingdom | The ship was driven ashore and wrecked at Cullen, Morayshire. Her crew were rescued by the Coast Guard using rocket apparatus. She was on a voyage from Gothenburg, Sweden to Ramsey, Isle of Man and/or Liverpool, Lancashire. |
| Magnolia | United States | The steamboat suffered a boiler explosion at St. Simon's, Georgia. Thirteen people were killed, eleven were injured. |
| Nine | United Kingdom | The brig was driven ashore 2 nautical miles (3.7 km) east of Almería, Spain. She was refloated the next day and resumed her voyage. |
| Rambler | United Kingdom | The sloop foundered in the North Sea off the coast of Norfolk. Her crew were rescued. She was on a voyage from Ipswich, Suffolk to Goole, Yorkshire. |
| Sarah and Johanna | Denmark | The ship was wrecked at "Bocarron". |
| Spring | United Kingdom | The ship ran aground and was damaged at Southwold, Suffolk. She was on a voyage from Middlesbrough, Yorkshire to Southwold. She was refloated the next day and taken in to Southwold. |
| Susan | United Kingdom | The ship was driven ashore and wrecked 6 nautical miles (11 km) east of Dunbar, Lothian. Her crew were rescued. She was on a voyage from Fraserburgh, Aberdeenshire to South Shields, County Durham. |
| Swallow | United Kingdom | The ship was driven ashore and sank at Findhorn, Morayshire. She was on a voyage from Sunderland, County Durham, to "Taire". |

== 10 January ==
List of shipwrecks: 10 January 1852
| Ship | State | Description |
|---|---|---|
| Alabama | United States | The barque was driven ashore at Hawkins Point, Baltimore, Maryland. She was on a voyage from New York to Rotterdam, South Holland, Netherlands. |
| Anna | Russia | The ship was driven ashore in Lough Foyle. Three of her eight crew were reported missing, five were rescued. |
| Arendina | Netherlands | The galiot was driven ashore and severely damaged in Lough Foyle. Her crew were rescued. She was on a voyage from Brǎila, Ottoman Empire to Londonderry, United Kingdom. |
| Bess | United Kingdom | The schooner was driven ashore and severely damaged at Ramsey, Isle of Man. She was on a voyage from Aberystwyth, Cardiganshire to Renfrew. |
| Black Prince | United Kingdom | The ship ran aground on the Aldeburgh Knapes, in the North Sea off the coast of Suffolk. She was on a voyage from Sunderland, County Durham, to London. She was refloated and put in to Great Yarmouth, Norfolk in a leaky condition. |
| Blanche | United Kingdom | The ship was driven ashore near New York, United States. She was on a voyage from Liverpool, Lancashire to Savannah, Georgia, United States. |
| Britannia | United Kingdom | The ship ran aground between the Dudgeon Sandbank and Cromer Lighthouse, Norfolk and sank. Her crew were rescued. She was on a voyage from South Shields, County Durham to L'Agulhas, Cape Colony and Quebec City, Province of Canada, British North America. |
| Ellen | United Kingdom | The ship was abandoned in the North Sea 50 nautical miles (93 km) east of South Shields, County Durham. Her crew were rescued by Tweed (United Kingdom). She was on a voyage from Sunderland to Dundee, Forfarshire. |
| Fender | United Kingdom | The sloop was driven ashore at Lindisfarne, Northumberland. |
| Humility | United Kingdom | The ship was driven ashore and sank at Corton, Suffolk. Her crew were rescued. She was refloated on 16 January and taken in to Great Yarmouth, Suffolk. |
| Leander | United Kingdom | The ship was driven ashore and damaged at Ramsey. She was on a voyage from Dublin to Port William, Wigtownshire. |
| Mandingo | United Kingdom | The ship sank in the North Sea 30 nautical miles (56 km) north east by north of Cromer, Norfolk. Her crew survived. She was on a voyage from Hartlepool, County Durham to Boulogne, Pas-de-Calais, France. |
| Marquess of Breadalbane | United Kingdom | The schooner was driven ashore at Lamlash, Isle of Arran. She was refloated on 28 January and taken in to Ardrossan, Ayrshire. |
| Marys | United Kingdom | The flat was driven ashore in Bangor Bay. Her crew survived. She was on a voyage from Exeter, Devon to Glasgow, Renfrewshire. |
| Nelson | United Kingdom | The brig was driven ashore at Great Yarmouth. She was refloated. |
| Sekjold | Denmark | The yacht was driven ashore and wrecked at Grenaa with the loss of all hands. She was on a voyage from Copenhagen to Aarhus. |
| Snekken | Norway | The ship was driven ashore and wrecked at "Gisselen", Sweden. Her crew were rescued. She was on a voyage from Rostock to Kallundborg, Sweden. |

== 11 January ==
List of shipwrecks: 11 January 1852
| Ship | State | Description |
|---|---|---|
| Active | United Kingdom | The smack was driven ashore at Bridlington, Yorkshire. She was on a voyage from Harwich, Essex to Gainsborough, Lincolnshire. She was refloated and taken in to Bridlington. |
| Amphitrite | United Kingdom | The ship was driven ashore at Ness Point, Suffolk. She floated off but consequently sank. Her crew were rescued. She was on a voyage from London to South Shields, County Durham. |
| Bransberg | United Kingdom | The ship foundered 7 nautical miles (13 km) off Lowestoft, Suffolk. Her crew were rescued. She was on a voyage from London to Newcastle upon Tyne, Northumberland. |
| Caroline | Malta | The brig was driven ashore and wrecked near the Hook Lighthouse, County Wexford, United Kingdom. Her crew were rescued. She was on a voyage from Galaţi, Ottoman Empire to Waterford, United Kingdom. |
| Champion | United Kingdom | The ship ran aground and was wrecked off Getterön, Sweden. Her crew were rescued. She was on a voyage from Riga, Russia to Arbroath, Forfarshire. |
| Edith | United Kingdom | The ship was driven ashore near Deal, Kent. She was on a voyage from Hartlepool, County Durham to Southampton, Hampshire. She was refloated and taken in to Ramsgate, Kent. |
| Engeline Helene | Netherlands | The ship was driven ashore and wrecked on Texel, North Holland with the loss of two of her crew. She was on a voyage from Lisbon, Portugal to a Dutch port. |
| Heber | United Kingdom | The ship struck the Crosswall and was damaged. She was on a voyage from London to Brixham, Devon. She put in to Ramsgate in a leaky condition. |
| Hutton | United Kingdom | The ship was driven ashore north of Sunderland, County Durham. She was refloated on 14 January. |
| Jane and Grace | United Kingdom | The ship was driven ashore on the Calf of Man, Isle of Man. Her crew were rescued. She was on a voyage from Dublin to Ardrossan, Ayrshire. |
| Lactura | United Kingdom | The sloop collided with Arabian (United Kingdom) and was abandoned with the loss of a crew member. She was on a voyage from Seville, Spain to the Clyde. |
| Liberty | United Kingdom | The schooner was driven ashore and wrecked at Cullish Head, Isle of Mull. Her crew were rescued. She was on a voyage from Sunderland to Dublin. |
| London | United Kingdom | The schooner ran aground on the Whiting Sand, in the North Sea off the coast of Suffolk. |
| Maria | United Kingdom | The ship was wrecked on a reef off the coast of Sweden. She was on a voyage from Helsingør, Denmark to Hull, Yorkshire. |
| Ocean | United Kingdom | The ship was driven ashore at the Landguard Fort, Felixtowe, Suffolk. She was on a voyage from London to Louth, Lincolnshire. She was refloated and taken in to Harwich. |
| Rapid | United Kingdom | The paddle tug struck rocks and sank in the Sound of Sanda with the loss of all but one of her crew. |
| Sylph | France | The brig was wrecked in Filey Bay. Her crew were rescued. |
| Thecla | (Russian Empire) Grand Duchy of Finland | The ship was driven ashore and damaged at Dover, Kent. She was on a voyage from London to Alexandria, Egypt. She was refloated and taken in to Dover. |
| Venelia | United Kingdom | The ship was wrecked at Skegness, Lincolnshire with the loss of three of her crew. She was on a voyage from Seaham, County Durham to King's Lynn, Norfolk. |
| William Cook | United Kingdom | The ship was driven ashore and wrecked at Southwold, Suffolk with the loss of a crew member. She was on a voyage from Hartlepool to Ramsgate. |
| York | United Kingdom | The schooner was in collision with a brig in the North Sea off the coast of Suffolk. Three of her five crew got aboard the brig. York was consequently beached on the Whiting Sand, where she was wrecked. The rest of her crew were rescued by the smack Aurora's Increase (United Kingdom). |

== 12 January ==
List of shipwrecks: 12 January 1852
| Ship | State | Description |
|---|---|---|
| Albert | United Kingdom | The barque was driven ashore at Craster, Northumberland. Her crew were rescued. She was on a voyage from Newcastle upon Tyne, Northumberland to Aberdeen. |
| Alexander | United Kingdom | The ship was driven ashore at Bowmore, Islay. |
| Anna | United Kingdom | The ship was driven ashore and sank at Moville, County Donegal with the loss of two of her crew. |
| Arragon | United Kingdom | The full-rigged ship was driven ashore at Bowmore. |
| Bassermaen | Bremen | The ship was wrecked on a reef off Puerto Plata, Dominican Republic. |
| Camelion | United Kingdom | The ship was driven ashore near Pwllheli, Caernarfonshire. She was on a voyage from Nantes, Loire-Inférieure, France to Liverpool, Lancashire. She was refloated on 19 January and taken in to Pwllheli. |
| Cinderella | (United Kingdom of Great Britain and Ireland) Jersey | The ship was wrecked on the Silver Keys. Her crew survived. She was on a voyage from Matanzas, Cuba to Cartagena, Spain. |
| Crown | United Kingdom | The ship was driven ashore at Portrush, County Antrim. |
| Dee | United Kingdom | The ship was driven ashore near Beaumaris, Anglesey. She was on a voyage from Wicklow to Liverpool. |
| Elizabeth | France | The ship was driven ashore and wrecked at Tuxpan, Mexico with the loss of all hands. She was on a voyage from Tampico, Mexico to Le Havre, Seine-Inférieure. |
| Fairy | United Kingdom | The ship sank at South Shields, County Durham. She was later refloated and beached for repairs. |
| Gezina Jantina | Netherlands | The ship was driven ashore near "Falga". She was on a voyage from Rouen, Seine-Inférieure to Amsterdam, North Holland. She was declared a total loss. |
| Orient | United Kingdom | The collier ran aground on the Trinity Sand, in the North Sea off the coast of Yorkshire. She was on a voyage from South Shields to London. She was refloated with assistance from the fishing smack Pink (United Kingdom) and taken in to Grimsby, Lincolnshire in a leaky condition. |
| Rose | United Kingdom | The ship was driven ashore at Islandmagee, County Antrim. She was on a voyage from Galaţi, Ottoman Empire to Londonderry. |
| Shakespeare | United Kingdom | The barque ran aground and was severely damaged at South Shields. |
| Sultan | United Kingdom | The brig was wrecked at Veracruz, Mexico. |
| Susan Ann | United Kingdom | The ship was driven ashore and wrecked at Veracruz, Mexico. She was on a voyage from Liverpool to Veracruz. |
| Union | United Kingdom | The sloop was driven ashore at Cellardyke, Fife. Her crew were rescued. She was on a voyage from Peterhead, Aberdeenshire to Newcastle upon Tyne, Northumberland. |
| William Burton | United Kingdom | The brig ran aground on the Dortwich Sand, off the coast of County Durham and broke her back. |

== 13 January ==
List of shipwrecks: 13 January 1852
| Ship | State | Description |
|---|---|---|
| Cantabrie | France | The brig was driven ashore and wrecked at Veracruz, Mexico. |
| E. Wilson | United States | The barque was driven ashore and wrecked at Veracruz. |
| Freia | France | The ship was driven ashore south of Philadelphia, Pennsylvania, United States. She was on a voyage from Bordeaux, Gironde to New York, United States. |
| Helen Mar | United States | The schooner was driven ashore and wrecked at Veracruz. |
| John S***. (partial name reported) | United States | The schooner was driven ashore and wrecked at Veracruz. |
| Judio Errante | Spain | The barque was driven ashore and wrecked at Veracruz. |
| Philomele | Belgium | The barque was driven ashore and wrecked at Veracruz. |
| Princesse Françisca | France | The barque was driven ashore and wrecked at Veracruz. |
| Principessa Campechana | Mexico | The ship was driven ashore and wrecked at Veracruz. |
| Robert Spelden | United States | The schooner was driven ashore and wrecked at Veracruz. |
| Rosina | United States | The barque was driven ashore and wrecked at Veracruz. |
| San José | Mexico | The ship was driven ashore and wrecked at Veracruz. |
| Susan Green | United Kingdom | The brig was driven ashore and wrecked at Veracruz. |
| Two Brothers | United Kingdom | The ship was driven ashore and wrecked at Scarborough, Yorkshire. Her crew were rescued. She was on a voyage from Folkestone, Kent to Scarborough. |
| Utility | United Kingdom | The schooner was wrecked on the Black Rocks, off North Sunderland, County Durham. Her crew were rescued. |

== 14 January ==
List of shipwrecks: 14 January 1852
| Ship | State | Description |
|---|---|---|
| Annechina | Hamburg | The ship was driven ashore at "Hormunstrand", Duchy of Holstein. Her crew were resccued. She was on a voyage from Rouen, Seine-Inférieure, France to Hamburg. |
| Eliza | United Kingdom | The brig sprang a leak and sank in the Bristol Channel south west of Lundy Island, Devon. Her crew were rescued. |
| Friendship | United Kingdom | The sloop was driven ashore and wrecked on the Spanish Battery Rocks, on the coast of County Durham. She was on a voyage from Stockton-on-Tees, County Durham to Newcastle upon Tyne, Northumberland. |
| George Washington | United States | The steamboat suffered a boiler explosion near Grand Gulf, Mississippi. Sixteen people were killed and ten were injured. |
| John Myers | United Kingdom | The schooner struck a sunken rock in the Sound of Islay and was beached. She was refloated and put in to Port Askaig, Islay in a leaky condition. |
| London | United Kingdom | The brig was wrecked on the Sizewell Bank, in the North Sea off the coast of Suffolk. Her crew were rescued. She was on a voyage from Hartlepool, County Durham to Rochester, Kent. |
| Martha Washington | United States | The steamboat destroyed by fire near Memphis, Tennessee with the loss of five lives. |
| Modeste | (United Kingdom of Great Britain and Ireland) Jersey | The ship was sighted whilst on a voyage from London to São Miguel Island, Azores. No further trace, presumed foundered with the loss of all hands. |
| Sorcière | (United Kingdom of Great Britain and Ireland) Guernsey | The ship was driven ashore and severely damaged on the north coast of Guernsey. She was on a voyage from Dartmouth, Devon to Guernsey. |
| Triton | United Kingdom | The ship was driven ashore at Flamborough Head, Yorkshire. She was on a voyage from Bridlington, Yorkshire to Sunderland, County Durham. |
| Uai | (United Kingdom of Great Britain and Ireland) British North America | The schooner was wrecked near "Mariedieu". She was on a voyage from Halifax, Nova Scotia to Newfoundland. |

== 15 January ==
List of shipwrecks: 15 January 1852
| Ship | State | Description |
|---|---|---|
| Blackett and Ridley | United Kingdom | The brig foundered in the North Sea. Her crew were rescued by a fishing smack. |
| Boothsouk | France | The barque was wrecked on the English Bank, in the River Plate. |
| George and Frances | United Kingdom | The ship was driven ashore and wrecked at Angle, Pembrokeshire. Her crew were rescued. She was on a voyage from Chepstow, Monmouthshire to Dublin. |
| Grace Wright | United Kingdom | The ship was driven ashore at Westport, County Mayo. She was later refloated and taken in to Ramsey, Isle of Man, where she arrived on 22 January. |
| Helton Grove | United Kingdom | The ship caught fire in the Indian Ocean. She was abandoned on 18 January and sank. All on board were rescued by Maria Elizabeth (Netherlands). Helton Grove was on a voyage from Newcastle upon Tyne, Northumberland to Aden. |
| Louisa | United Kingdom | The brig ran aground on the Haisborough Sands, in the North Sea off the coast of Norfolk and sank. Her crew took to a boat and were rescued by the smack Favourite (United Kingdom). Louisa was on a voyage from Newcastle upon Tyne, Northumberland to Portsmouth, Hampshire. |
| Nio | United Kingdom | The brig was wrecked on the Middle Sand, in the North Sea off the coast of Essex. Her crew were rescued by the smack Foam (United Kingdom). Nio was on a voyage from West Hartlepool, County Durham to London. |
| Odin | Chile | The ship was driven ashore and wrecked on Terceira Island, Azores with the loss of two of her crew. She was on a voyage from Valparaíso to Cowes, Isle of Wight, United Kingdom. |
| Resolution | United Kingdom | The ship was abandoned in the North Sea off Camperduin, North Holland, Netherlands. Her crew were rescued by Java Courier (Netherlands). Resolution was on a voyage from Liverpool, Lancashire to Zierikzee, South Holland, Netherlands. |
| Robin and Thomas | United Kingdom | The ship was abandoned in the English Channel off the coast of Dorset. Her crew were rescued by the Coast Guard. Robin and Thomas was on a voyage from Plymouth, Devon to Southampton, Hampshire. She was taken in to Swanage, Dorset in a waterlogged condition. |
| St. George | United Kingdom | The steamship departed from Saint John's, Newfoundland, British North America for Cork and Liverpool, Lancashire. No further trace, presumed foundered with the loss of all hands. |
| Two Brothers | United Kingdom | The ship was driven ashore and wrecked at Scarborough, Yorkshire. Her crew were rescued. |

== 16 January ==
List of shipwrecks: 16 January 1852
| Ship | State | Description |
|---|---|---|
| Grange | United Kingdom | The ship ran aground on the Banjaard Sand, in the North Sea off the Dutch coast. She was on a voyage from Odesa to Rotterdam, South Holland, Netherlands. |
| Isis | United Kingdom | The schooner was driven ashore and wrecked 4 nautical miles (7.4 km) west of Dungeness, Kent. Her crew were rescued. She was on a voyage from Dieppe, Seine-Inférieure, France to Sunderland, County Durham. |
| Sidney Packet | United Kingdom | The ship was driven ashore at Theddlethorpe, Lincolnshire. She was on a voyage from Lowestoft, Suffolk to Hartlepool, County Durham. She was refloated. |
| Venus | Prussia | The ship was wrecked on the Falsterbo Reef, in the Baltic Sea. Her crew were rescued. She was on a voyage from Memel to Newcastle upon Tyne, Northumberland, United Kingdom. |
| William and Richard | United Kingdom | The smack was driven ashore at Holmpton, Yorkshire. |
| William Barker | United Kingdom | The ship ran aground on the Goswick Sand Ridge, in the North Sea off the coast of Northumberland. She was on a voyage from Elie, Fife to Hull, Yorkshire. She was refloated and taken in to Lindisfarne, Northumberland. |

== 17 January ==
List of shipwrecks: 17 January 1852
| Ship | State | Description |
|---|---|---|
| Admiral Duncan | United Kingdom | The smack was driven ashore and wrecked 3 nautical miles (5.6 km) east of Calais, France. Her crew were rescued. She was on a voyage from Pontrieux, Côtes-du-Nord, France to London. |
| Anna Margretha Kirstine Jansen | Denmark | The ship ran aground at Helsingør. She was on a voyage from Newcastle upon Tyne, Northumberland, United Kingdom to Køge. |
| Fauvette | United Kingdom | The ship ran aground and was damaged at Concarneau, Finistère. She was on a voyage from Bordeaux, Gironde to Constantinople, Ottoman Empire. |
| Gallia | France | The ship ran aground at Le Havre, Seine-Inférieure. She was on a voyage from Mobile, Alabama, United States to Le Havre. She was refloated and completed her voyage, arriving on 19 January. |
| North Star | United Kingdom | The ship was destroyed by fire in Balta Sound, Shetlands Islands. |
| Orion | United Kingdom | The schooner was driven ashore and wrecked at Boulmer, Northumberland. |

== 18 January ==
List of shipwrecks: 18 January 1852
| Ship | State | Description |
|---|---|---|
| Blanche | United Kingdom | The ship was holed by ice at New York and became severely leaky. |
| City of Pittsburgh | United States | The steamship was driven ashore by ice and damaged near New York. |
| Cupid | United Kingdom | The ship was driven ashore and severely damaged 1 nautical mile (1.9 km) east of Wells-next-the-Sea, Norfolk. She was on a voyage from Aldeburgh, Suffolk to Wells-next-the-Sea. She was refloated the next day. |
| Hilton Grove | United Kingdom | The ship was abandoned in the Indian Ocean, her cargo of coal having caught fire on 15 January. Her passengers and crew were rescued the next day by Maria Elizabeth (Netherlands). Hilton Grove was on a voyage from Newcastle upon Tyne, Northumberland to Aden. |
| Jane and Margaret | United Kingdom | The brig caught fire at Great Yarmouth, Norfolk and was beached. She was severely damaged. |
| Washington | United States | The ship was driven ashore on Flinn's Knoll, New York. She was on a voyage from Liverpool, Lancashire, United Kingdom to New York. She was refloated on 18 January and resumed her voyage. |
| Yorkshire | United Kingdom | The ship was driven ashore on Staten Island, New York. She was on a voyage from Liverpool to New York. She was later refloated. |

== 19 January ==
List of shipwrecks: 19 January 1852
| Ship | State | Description |
|---|---|---|
| Mary | United Kingdom | The sloop was wrecked at Port William, Wigtownshire. She was on a voyage from Liverpool, Lancashire to Leith, Lothian. |
| Mary | United Kingdom | The full-rigged ship caught fire and exploded in the Bonny River. Her crew survived. |
| Martha | United Kingdom | The ship was driven ashore at North Somercotes, Lincolnshire. She was on a voyage from Southampton, Hampshire to Newcastle upon Tyne, Northumberland. She was refloated the next day. |
| Theotochos | Greece | The brig was driven ashore at the "Burrow of Ballyteague", County Wexford, United Kingdom. Her crew were rescued. She was on a voyage from Alexandria, Egypt to Liverpool. She broke up the next day. |
| Warwick | United Kingdom | The ship ran aground on the Bird Island Reef. Her crew were rescued. She was on a voyage from Liverpool to Apalachicola, Florida. She became a wreck the next day. |
| William Parker | United Kingdom | The ship was driven ashore near Saltfleet, Lincolnshire. She was on a voyage from London to Goole, Yorkshire. She was refloated. |

== 20 January ==
List of shipwrecks: January 1852
| Ship | State | Description |
|---|---|---|
| Bonito | (United Kingdom of Great Britain and Ireland) British North America | The barque was driven ashore on the coast of New Brunswick. She was on a voyage from Saint John, New Brunswick to Barbados. She was refloated and taken in to Brier Island, Nova Scotia for repairs. |
| Earl of Errol | United Kingdom | The barque sprang a leak and foundered in the North Sea. Her crew sought refuge on the Kentish Knock Lightship ( Trinity House), from where they were rescued. She was on a voyage from Sunderland, County Durham, to Boulogne-sur-Mer, Pas-de-Calais, France. |
| Koning Willem II | Netherlands | The ship ran aground of Depfords Rock, off "Banjoewangie", Netherlands East Indies. She was refloated the next day and taken in to Surabaya. |
| Sabrina | (United Kingdom of Great Britain and Ireland) Gambia Colony and Protectorate | The ship was wrecked at Limehouse, British Honduras. |
| Spray | United Kingdom | The brig was run down and sunk in the River Thames downstream of Gravesend, Kent by the steamship Royal Adelaide (United Kingdom). Her six crew were rescued, three by Royal Adelaide. Spray was on a voyage from Whitby, Yorkshire to London. |
| Wanskapen | Flag unknown | The ship ran aground on the Goodwin Sands, Kent. She was on a voyage from South Shields, County Durham to Palma de Mallorca, Spain. |

== 21 January ==
List of shipwrecks: 21 January 1852
| Ship | State | Description |
|---|---|---|
| Anne and Catherine | United Kingdom | The schooner was driven ashore and damaged at Beaumaris, Anglesey. She was on a voyage from Holyhead, Anglesey to Bangor, Caernarfonshire. She was refloated. |
| Arienis | United Kingdom | The ship was wrecked on "Engaño Island", Spanish East Indies. with the loss of seven of her crew. Seventeen survivors subsequently died on the island. Arienis was on a voyage from Bombay, India to China. |
| Camilla, and Elizabeth | United Kingdom | The schooner Elizabeth was run into by the paddle steamer Camilla off the coast of Kent and was severely damaged. She was towed in to Dover, Kent by Camilla, which struck the pier on entering that port and damaged her paddlebox. Elizabeth was on a voyage from Sunderland, County Durham, to Rouen, Seine-Inférieure, France. Camilla was on a voyage from London to Dublin. |
| Diego de Leon | Spain | The ship was holed by her anchor at Liverpool, Lancashire, United Kingdom. She was on a voyage from Valencia to Liverpool. She was taken in to Liverpool in a severely leaky condition. |
| Fanny | United Kingdom | The schooner struck a sunken wreck and consequently foundered in the North Sea off Aldeburgh, Suffolk. Her crew were rescued. She was on a voyage from Rouen, Seine-Inférieure, France to Newcastle upon Tyne, Northumberland. |
| Fawn | United Kingdom | The ship was driven ashore south of New York, United States. |
| Firefly | United Kingdom | The ship was driven ashore and sank at the Mumbles, Glamorgan. Her crew were rescued. She was refloated on 25 January and taken in to Swansea, Glamorgan |
| Jack | (United Kingdom of Great Britain and Ireland) New South Wales | The ship ran aground at the mouth of the Hawkesbury River. She was on a voyage from Brisbane to Sydney. |
| James and Maria | United Kingdom | The schooner was driven ashore at Beaumaris. She was refloated. |
| Jane | United Kingdom | The schooner sprang a leak and sank at Kirkcaldy, Fife. She was on a voyage from Newcastle upon Tyne, Northumberland to Pettycur, Fife. She was refloated on 31 January. |
| Leander | United Kingdom | The ship was driven ashore in the Solent. She was on a voyage from Newcastle upon Tyne to Madras, India. She was refloated and taken in to Portsmouth, Hampshire. |
| Robert E. Ward, or Robert Edward | United Kingdom | The schooner was driven ashore at the entrance to Larne Lough, She was on a voyage from Londonderry to Liverpool, Lancashire. |
| Platina | United Kingdom | The ship was driven ashore south of New York. |
| St. Winifred | United Kingdom | The flat was driven ashore at Beaumaris. She was on a voyage from Chester, Cheshire to Holyhead. |
| William Green | United Kingdom | The schooner sprang a leak and was beached on Rathlin Island, County Donegal. She was on a voyage from Killybegs, County Donegal to Liverpool. |

== 22 January ==
List of shipwrecks: 22 January 1852
| Ship | State | Description |
|---|---|---|
| Amelia | United Kingdom | The ship wasin collision with Argo (United Kingdom and was consequently beached at Great Yarmouth, Norfolk. She was refloated and taken in to Great Yarmouth. |
| Devon | United Kingdom | The brig ran aground on the Maplin Sand, in the North Sea off the coast of Essex. She was on a voyage from Sunderland, County Durham, to London. She was refloated and resumed her voyage. |
| Edward | United Kingdom | The flat sank off Conwy, Caernarfonshire. Her crew were rescued. She was on a voyage from Penmaenmawr, Caernarfonshire to Runcorn, Cheshire. |
| Emma | United Kingdom | The ship was driven ashore at Portrush, County Antrim. She was on a voyage from Liverpool, Lancashire to Londonderry. |
| Fowler | United Kingdom | The ship was driven ashore at Tralee, County Kerry. She was on a voyage from Tralee to Bristol, Gloucestershire or Gloucester. She was refloated on 5 February. |
| Jemima | United Kingdom | The schooner was driven ashore and wrecked on the Spanish Battery Rocks, on the coast of County Durham. She was on a voyage from South Shields, County Durham to Arbroath, Forfarshire. |
| Stag | United Kingdom | The flat sank off Conwy. Her crew were rescued. She was on a voyage from Saltney, Cheshire to Holyhead, Anglesey. |

== 23 January ==
List of shipwrecks: 23 January 1852
| Ship | State | Description |
|---|---|---|
| Alpha | United Kingdom | The ship was abandoned off the Calf of Man, Isle of Man. She was on a voyage from Liverpool, Lancashire to Montevideo, Uruguay. She subsequently came ashore at Port Erin, Isle of Man and was wrecked. |
| Ancient Briton | United Kingdom | The ship struck a sunken rock off the Andaman Islands (11°08′N 93°56′E) and was holed. She was refloated the next day but consequently foundered on 25 January. Her crew took to two boats, one of which reached Acheen, Netherlands East Indies on 2 February. Ancient Briton was on a voyage from Ceylon to Moulmein, Burma. |
| Ann | United Kingdom | The ship was driven ashore on Rathlin Island, County Donegal. Her crew were rescued. |
| Charles | United Kingdom | The ship was abandoned in the Atlantic Ocean. Her crew were rescued. She was on a voyage from the Bay of Honduras to Plymouth Devon. |
| Gloria | United Kingdom | The ship ran aground and was severely damaged at Holyhead, Anglesey. She was on a voyage from Brăila, Ottoman Empire to Holyhead. |
| Glory | United Kingdom | The ship was driven ashore at Holyhead. She was on a voyage from Liverpool, Lancashire to Rotterdam, South Holland, Netherlands. She was refloated by the hobbling boat Llewellyn (United Kingdom) and taken in to Penmaenmawr, Caernarfonshire. |
| Herschel | United Kingdom | The ship was wrecked in Table Bay. Her crew were rescued. She was on a voyage from Dundee, Forfarshire to Cape Town, Cape Colony. |
| Joseph Fenton | United Kingdom | The ship struck a sunken wreck and sank in the North Sea off Sheringham, Norfolk. Her crew were rescued. |
| Pitzer Miller | United States | The steamboat suffered a boiler explosion at the mouth of the White River with the loss of several lives. |
| Stag | United Kingdom | The smack was driven ashore and severely damaged near Morecambe, Lancashire. Her crew were rescued. |
| Tinker | United Kingdom | The sloop sprang a leak and foundered 4 nautical miles (7.4 km) north west of the Isle of May. Her crew were rescued. She was on a voyage from Newcastle upon Tyne to Leith, Lothian. |
| Vivid | United Kingdom | The sloop was driven ashore and damaged in Campbeltown Loch. She was on a voyage from Glasgow, Renfrewshire to Oban, Argyllshire. |
| Wasdale | United Kingdom | The ship ran aground on a reef off Sandy Island, Antigua. She was on a voyage from Whitehaven, Cumberland to Jamaica. She was refloated on 25 January and resumed her voyage. |

== 24 January ==
List of shipwrecks: 24 January 1852
| Ship | State | Description |
|---|---|---|
| Agenoria | United Kingdom | The ship was driven ashore at Mauritius. |
| Agnes | United Kingdom | The ship ran aground off the Memory Rock, in the Bahamas. She was on a voyage from British Honduras to London. She was refloated and taken in to Nassau, Bahamas. |
| Albion | United Kingdom | The ship was driven ashore at Crosby Point, Lancashire. She was on a voyage from Liverpool, Lancashire to Apalachicola, Florida. She was refloated and put back to Liverpool. |
| Ann and Elizabeth | United Kingdom | The schooner was wrecked on the Kentish Knock with the loss of two lives. Survivors were rescued by the Barking smack Alpha (United Kingdom) She was on a voyage from Mogador, Morocco to London. |
| Ben Nevis | United Kingdom | The barque was in collision with the galiot Elizabeth (United Kingdom) and sank in the North Sea with the loss of all hands. She was on a voyage from Grimsby, Lincolnshire to South Shields, County Durham. |
| Fenella | United Kingdom | The steamship was driven ashore in Lough Swilly. She was refloated on 5 February. |
| Guide | United Kingdom | The brig sprang a leak and foundered in the North Sea off Cromer, Norfolk with the loss of all but her captain. He was rescued by Inconstant (United Kingdom). Guide was on a voyage from Hartlepool, County Durham to the River Thames. |
| James L. Bogart | United States | The ship ran aground on Indian Key, Florida. She was on a voyage from Bath, Maine to Mobile, Alabama. She was refloated and resumed her voyage. |
| Leeds | United Kingdom | The paddle steamer was abandoned in the Irish Sea 18 to 20 nautical miles (33 to 37 km) north west of Point Lynas, Anglesey. All 80 people on board were rescued by Empire State (United States). Leeds was on a voyage from Dublin to Liverpool, Lancashire. |
| Loire | French Navy | The Perdrix-class gabarre ran aground between Sainte Marie and Goyave, Guadeloupe and was wrecked. All on board survived. Also reported as 18 January. |
| Maria Jesusa | Spain | The schooner was wrecked on the Anegada Shoals. She was on a voyage from Bilbao to Puerto Rico. |
| Nancy | United Kingdom | The ship was driven ashore in Loch Ròg. Her crew were rescued. She was on a voyage from Harrington, Cumberland to Westport, County Mayo. |
| William | United Kingdom | The schooner sprang a leak and was beached on Rathlin Island, County Donegal. She was on a voyage from Liverpool to Killybegs, County Donegal. |

== 25 January ==
List of shipwrecks: January 1852
| Ship | State | Description |
|---|---|---|
| De Witt Clinton | United States | The steamboat struck a submerged object and sank in the Mississippi River near Memphis, Tennessee with the loss of 40 lives. |
| Grove | United Kingdom | The ship foundered in the North Sea off Robin Hoods Bay, Yorkshire. Her crew were rescued. |
| Kelso | India | The ship was destroyed by fire in the Hooghly River with the loss of a crew member. She was on a voyage from Calcutta to Bombay. |
| Speculation | United Kingdom | The ship was abandoned in the Irish Sea off Point Lynas, Anglesey. Her crew were rescued by Prince (United Kingdom). Speculation was on a voyage from Wicklow to Runcorn, Cheshire. She was towed in to Liverpool by the tug Dreadnought (United Kingdom). |

== 26 January ==
List of shipwrecks: 26 January 1852
| Ship | State | Description |
|---|---|---|
| Factors | United Kingdom | The ship was driven ashore at Maryport, Cumberland. |
| Frederick | United Kingdom | The ship was driven ashore at Thorpeness, Suffolk. Her crew were rescued. She was on a voyage from Sunderland, County Durham, to Boulogne, Pas-de-Calais, France. |
| Johanna Juliana | Netherlands | The ship was driven ashore in the Dardanelles near Barber's Point. She was on a voyage from Amsterdam, North Holland to Constantinople, Ottoman Empire. |
| Thetis | United Kingdom | The ship ran aground on the Corton Sand, in the North Sea off the coast of Suffolk. She was on a voyage from Newcastle upon Tyne, Northumberland to London. She was refloated and resumed her voyage. |

== 27 January ==
List of shipwrecks: 27 January 1852
| Ship | State | Description |
|---|---|---|
| Chio | Greece | The brig was driven ashore on Cullen Island, County Mayo, United Kingdom. She was refloated the next day. |
| Ellen | (United Kingdom of Great Britain and Ireland) Guernsey | The ship was driven ashore in Studland Bay. She was refloated on 29 January and taken in to Poole, Dorset |
| Friendsbury | United Kingdom | The ship was driven ashore at the Orford Low Lighthouse, Suffolk. Her six crew were rescued. She was on a voyage from Inverness and/or Inverkeithing, Fife to London. |
| John and Mary | United Kingdom | The brig was driven ashore and severely damaged at Sunderland, County Durham. She was refloated on 5 February and taken in to Sunderland. |
| John French | United States | The ship was wrecked on the Hogsty Reef. Her crew survived. |
| Levenside | United Kingdom | The ship was wrecked at Stanley, Falkland Islands. All on board were rescued. |
| Two True Friends | United Kingdom | The ship sprang a leak and put in to Harwich, Essex, where she was beached and holed by her anchor. She was on a voyage from London to King's Lynn, Norfolk. |
| Urania | United Kingdom | The ship ran aground on the Half-Ebb Rock. She was on a voyage from London to Harwich. She was refloated and taken in to Harwicn. |
| Victory | United Kingdom | The schooner ran aground on the Sizewell Bank, in the North Sea off the coast of Suffolk and was abandoned. Her crew were rescued. She was on a voyage from Sunderland to Maldon, Essex. |

== 28 January ==
List of shipwrecks: 28 January 1852
| Ship | State | Description |
|---|---|---|
| Emma and Sarah | United Kingdom | The brig was driven ashore and wrecked 3 nautical miles (5.6 km) north of Newton-by-the-Sea, Northumberland. Her crew were rescued. She was on a voyage from London to the Tyne. |
| Thomas Mazagrem | France | The ship was driven ashore at New Romney, Kent, United Kingdom. She was on a voyage from Bordeaux, Gironde, to Dunkirk, Nord. She was refloated and taken in to Folkestone, Kent, where she ran aground. |
| Victoria | United Kingdom | The schooner was driven ashore at Blankenese. She was on a voyage from Hull, Yorkshire to Hamburg. She was refloated and completed her voyage. |

== 29 January ==
List of shipwrecks: 29 January 1852
| Ship | State | Description |
|---|---|---|
| Countess of Kinnoul | United Kingdom | The ship ran aground between Ryhope and Seaham, County Durham and was wrecked. She was on a voyage from Newcastle upon Tyne, Northumberland to London. |
| Integrity | United Kingdom | The ship ran aground at Teignmouth, Devon. |
| Martha | United Kingdom | The barque was wrecked on Sal, Cape Verde Islands with the loss of a crew member. She was on a voyage from Liverpool, Lancashire to Montevideo, Uruguay. |
| Pallas | France | The ship was driven ashore and wrecked at Abrevach, Finistère. Her crew were rescued. She was on a voyage from Barfleur, Manche to Bordeaux, Gironde. |
| Sarah Sands | United Kingdom | The steamship ran aground on the Little Burbo Bank, in Liverpool Bay. Her passengers were taken off. She was on a voyage from Rio de Janeiro, Brazil to Liverpool. Sarah Sands was subsequently refloated and taken in to Liverpool. She was refloated. |
| Tino | United Kingdom | The ship struck a sunken wreck in the North Sea off Orfordness, Suffolk. She was on a voyage from Sunderland, County Durham, to Arundel, Sussex. She was refloated and resumed her voyage in a leaky condition. |

== 30 January ==
List of shipwrecks: 30 January 1852
| Ship | State | Description |
|---|---|---|
| Agenoria | United Kingdom | The schooner ran aground and was wrecked on the Gunfleet Sand, in the North Sea off the coast of Essex. Her crew survived. She was on a voyage from Hartlepool, County Durham to London. |
| Avendina | Flag unknown | The galiot was driven ashore and wrecked near Moville, County Donegal, United Kingdom. Her ten crew were rescued. |
| Betsey | United Kingdom | The sloop was wrecked at Cardigan. Her three crew were rescued. She was on a voyage from Caernarfon to Milford Haven, Pembrokeshire. |
| Freia | Norway | The ship was driven ashore at Ihlen. She was refloated on 4 February and taken in to Trondheim. |
| Fremad | Norway | The brig was in collision with Mala Maritza (Flag unknown) and sank between Chios and Psara, Greece. Her crew were rescued. She was on a voyage from Syra, Greece to Constantinople, Ottoman Empire. |
| General Warren | United States | Grounded during a storm on the Clatsop Spit at the mouth of the Columbia River in northern Oregon |
| Jane Emily | United Kingdom | The ship ran aground at Donaghadee, County Down. She was on a voyage from Londonderry to Liverpool, Lancashire. she was refloated. |
| Jane Hughes | United Kingdom | The ship ran aground at South Shields, County Durham. She was on a voyage from Agrigento, Sicily to South Shields. |
| Janken Hilberdina | Bremen | The ship was wrecked on Wangeroog, Kingdom of Hanover. Her crew were rescued. She was on a voyage from the Weser to a Scottish port. |
| Louis | France | The ship foundered in the English Channel off Barfleur, Manche. Her crew were rescued. She was on a voyage from Charleston, South Carolina, United States to Rouen, Seine-Inférieure. |
| Ruby | United Kingdom | The ship ran aground and was damaged south of Filey, Yorkshire. She was on a voyage from South Shields, County Durham to London. She was refloated and taken in to Scarborough, Yorkshire. |
| Prince Albert | United Kingdom | The ship was driven ashore at Penmon, Anglesey. She was on a voyage from Wicklow to Woodend, Cheshire. |
| Seagull | United Kingdom | The ship was driven ashore at Exmouth, Devon. |
| Triumph | United Kingdom | The schooner was in collision with Tinto (United Kingdom) and was abandoned in the English Channel off Beachy Head, Sussex. Her crew were rescued by Tinto. Triumph was on a voyage from London to Mogador, Morocco. She was taken in tow by the fishing smack Elizabeth (United Kingdom), which intended to tow her in to Deal, Kent. The tow was lost and she was subsequently taken in to by August Victorine and another smack (both France) which towed her in to Dieppe, Seine-Inférieure, France. |
| Zebedee | United Kingdom | The ship was driven ashore in Thurlestone Bay. Her crew were rescued. |

== 31 January ==
List of shipwrecks: 31 January 1852
| Ship | State | Description |
|---|---|---|
| Brandon | United Kingdom | The schooner was in collision with Berbice (United Kingdom and sank in the Irish Sea 12 nautical miles (22 km) north west of The Smalls with the loss of five of the seven people on board. The survivors were rescued by Berbice. Brandon was on a voyage from Kinsale, County Cork to Cardiff, Glamorgan. |
| General Warren | United States | The steamboat was wrecked at Astoria, Missouri with the loss of 42 lives. |
| George Thacker | United States | The ship was wrecked in the Sandwich Islands. She was on a voyage from San Francisco, California to Calcutta, India. |
| Isa | United Kingdom | The ship ran aground on Scroby Sands, Norfolk. She was refloated the next day and taken in to Great Yarmouth, Norfolk in a leaky condition. |
| La Réforme | France | The chasse-marée ran aground on the Corton Sand, in the North Sea off the coast of Suffolk, United Kingdom. She was on a voyage from She was refloated but consequently had to be beached. She was refloated the next day and taken in to Lowestoft, Suffolk. |
| Louise Amelie | France | The schooner was driven ashore at Brancaster, Norfolk. She was on a voyage from Sunderland, County Durham, United Kingdom to Bordeaux, Gironde. |

== Unknown date ==
List of shipwrecks: Unknown date in January 1852
| Ship | State | Description |
|---|---|---|
| Alacrity | United Kingdom | The ship was driven ashore in the Black Sea before 10 January. She was on a voyage from Brǎila, Ottoman Empire to Falmouth, Cornwall or Queenstown, County Cork. She was later refloated and put in to Constantinople, Ottoman Empire for repairs. |
| Alnwick | United Kingdom | The ship was driven ashore and wrecked in the Gut of Canso. She was on a voyage from Port Wallace, Nova Scotia, British North America to London. |
| Anne McKenzie | United Kingdom | The ship was abandoned in the North Sea 160 nautical miles (300 km) off the coast of County Durham before 19 January. Her crew were rescued by Haabet (Sweden). |
| Attiglio | Austrian Empire | The ship was wrecked in the Danube at "Argania" before 10 January. |
| Bertha | Hamburg | The barque was wrecked on a reef 17 nautical miles (31 km) north east by east of Gorgona Island, Republic of New Granada with the subsequently loss of a crew member. Survivors were rescued by the barque Herschel (United States). Bertha was on a voyage from Norfolk, Virginia, United States to Liverpool, Lancashire. |
| Clausina | United Kingdom | The ship was driven ashore at McNair's Point, Nova Scotia before 22 January. She was on a voyage from Prince Edward Island, British North America to Liverpool. She was consequently condemned. |
| Cupid | United Kingdom | The ship was driven ashore and severely damaged at Wells-next-the-Sea, Norfolk. She was refloated on 19 January. |
| Cupidon | Belgium | The ship capsized in the Mediterranean Sea before 9 December. She was on a voyage from Marans, Charente-Maritime to Toulon, Var, France. |
| Deotocos | Greece | The ship was driven ashore at the Barrow of Ballyteague, County Limerick, United Kingdom. She broke up on 20 January. |
| Duca di Genova | Kingdom of Sardinia | The brig was wrecked on Vlieland, Friesland, Netherlands before 10 January with the loss of four of her crew. She was on a voyage from Saint Domingo to Amsterdam, North Holland, Netherlands. |
| Festinalente | Norway | The schooner was abandoned in the Mediterranean Sea before 5 January. Her crew were rescued. She was on a voyage from Genoa, Kingdom of Sardinia to Cette, Hérault, France. She was subsequently towed in to Mahón, Spain. |
| Five Sisters | United Kingdom | The barque was abandoned in the Atlantic Ocean (40°14′N 41°13′W) before 16 January. |
| Four Sisters, or Twin Sisters | United Kingdom | The ship was driven ashore in Allonby Bay before 22 January. She was on a voyage from Barrow in Furness, Lancashire to Maryport. She was consequently condemned. |
| Independence | United Kingdom | The full-rigged ship was driven ashore at Manasquan, New Jersey, United States. She broke up on 17 January. |
| Ingrid and Cathrina | Sweden | The ship was driven ashore and wrecked near Domsten. She was on a voyage from Gothenborg to Ystad and Carlshamn. |
| Juliet | United Kingdom | The ship was severely damaged by fire at Saint John, New Brunswick, British North America. |
| Lady Peel | United Kingdom | The ship foundered in the North Sea off the coast of Denmark before 9 January. |
| Leavitt | United Kingdom | The ship ran aground and was damaged at the mouth of the Mississippi River before 14 January. She was on a voyage from New Orleans, Louisiana, United States to Liverpool. She had been refloated by 28 January and taken in to New Orleans. |
| Lucifer | Prussia | The barque ran aground in the Saint Lawrence River. She was on a voyage from Quebec City, Province of Canada, British North America to New York She was refloated and resumed her voyage. |
| Martina | Danzig | The ship ran aground on the Morups Reef and was abandoned before 6 January. She was on a voyage from Danzig to a French port. She was refloated and taken in to Varberg, Sweden for repairs. |
| Mechanic | United Kingdom | The ship was driven ashore in Filey Bay. She was on a voyage from London to Hartlepool, County Durham. She was refloated on 26 January and taken in to Scarborough, Yorkshire. |
| Melrose | France | The ship was abandoned in the Atlantic Ocean before 8 January. She was on a voyage from Saint John, New Brunswick, British North America to "Matayas". |
| Propontis | Russia | The brig was wrecked at Troy, Ottoman Empire before 10 January. |
| Record | United Kingdom | The barque was driven ashore at North Point, Virginia, United States before 16 December. |
| Rising Sun | United Kingdom | The ship was driven ashore at Teignmouth, Devon. She was refloated on 1 February. |
| Ruby | United Kingdom | The ship was driven ashore and wrecked at Helsingør, Denmark before 31 January. She was on a voyage from Saint Petersburg, Russia to Dundee, Forfarshire. |
| St. Paul | United States | The ship was driven ashore in the San Bernardino Strait before 8 January. |
