= USS LSM-380 =

LSM-1-class landing ship medium

Coordinates: 46.1906097°N 123.7463713°W

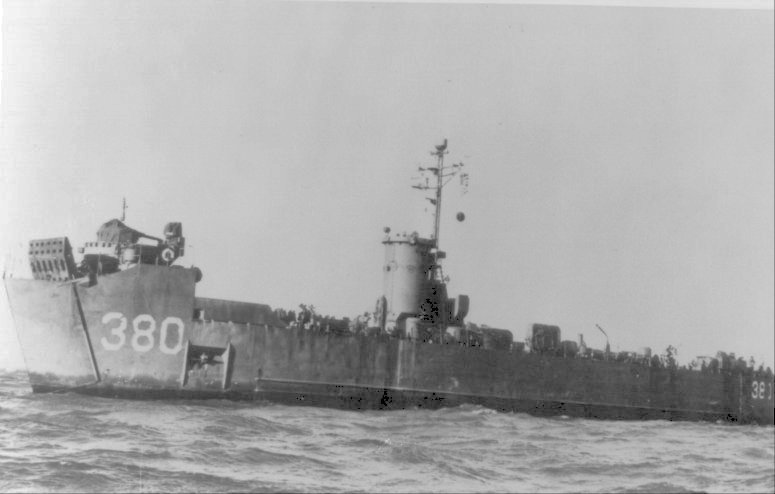
- USS LSM-380

History

United States
- Name: LSM-380
- Builder: Brown Shipbuilding Co., Houston
- Laid down: 23 December 1944
- Launched: 13 January 1945
- Commissioned: 10 February 1945
- Decommissioned: 19 February 1948
- Stricken: 12 March 1948
- Identification: IMO number: 5308251; MMSI number: 366766530; Callsign: WKGY
- Honors and awards: See Awards
- Fate: Sold to merchant service, 27 February 1948

General characteristics
- Class & type: LSM-1-class landing ship medium
- Displacement: 520 long tons (528 t) light; 743 long tons (755 t) landing; 1,095 long tons (1,113 t) full load
- Length: 203 ft 6 in (62.03 m) o/a
- Beam: 34 ft 6 in (10.52 m)
- Draft: 3 ft 6 in (1.07 m) forward; 7 ft 8 in (2.34 m) aft; Fully loaded : 6 ft 4 in (1.93 m) forward; 8 ft 3 in (2.51 m) aft
- Propulsion: 2 × Fairbanks-Morse (model 38D81/8X10, reversible with hydraulic clutch) diesels. Direct drive with 1,440 bhp (1,074 kW) each @ 720 rpm, twin screws
- Speed: 13.2 knots (15.2 mph; 24.4 km/h)
- Range: 4,900 nmi (9,100 km) at 12 kn (22 km/h)
- Capacity: 5 medium or 3 heavy tanks, or 6 LVTs, or 9 DUKWs
- Troops: 2 officers, 46 enlisted
- Complement: 5 officers, 54 enlisted
- Armament: 6 × 20 mm AA gun mounts
- Armour: 10-lb. STS splinter shield to gun mounts, pilot house and conning station

USS LSM-380 was a LSM-1-class landing ship medium in the United States Navy during World War II. She was later sold to Fred Devine to be used as a salvage ship, renamed MV Salvage Chief. She is the last known surviving LSM of World War II in the world.

== Construction and career ==
LSM-380 was laid down on 23 December 1944 at Brown Shipbuilding Co., Houston, Texas. Launched on 13 January 1945 and commissioned on 10 February 1945.

During World War II, LSM-380 was assigned to the Asiatic-Pacific theater. She took part in the Occupation and China service from 18 July to 24 November 1946. She would leave China and sailed to Guam in December 1946, and on to Pearl Harbor in January 1947 before making her final leg across the Pacific to San Francisco, where she would join the mothball fleet at Suisan Bay.

LSM-380 was decommissioned on 19 February 1948 and few days later on the 27th, she was sold to Devine Salvage Co. to be converted and used as a salvage ship with the name MV Salvage Chief.

She was struck from the Navy Register on 12 March 1948.

In 1949, she helped to refloat SS Pine Bluff Victory, which had run aground in the Columbia River.

In December 1952, she refloated the liberty ship named SS Yorkmar, near the entrance to Grays Harbor on the Washington coast.

In November and October 1956, the ship refloated the wrecked Nozima Maru in attempt to tow her to Japan for scrap but was caught in bad weather which led to the ship capsizing and abandoned in place to this day in Kiska Harbor. During the salvage mission, Chief Engineer Dick Floyd suffered a heart attack and died on board the ship.

In 1967, she pulled the Greek freighter SS Captyannis off from the Clatsop Spit.

On 17 December 1976, the Liberian oil tanker SS Sansinena exploded at the dock at the Port of Los Angeles. Salvage Chief was dispatched to salvage the wreck and pump out oil from the harbor.

In the 1980s, the ship underwent refit in Astoria and given a new bridge followed by a helicopter deck on the aft.

She would also stabilize and eventually assist in the transit of the crippled supertanker Exxon Valdez from Prince William Sound to San Diego in 1989.

In February, she was called off during the New Carissa incident. December 1999, she would again take part in the rescue of the barge, Mr. Chips.

The ship was retired in 2015 and sold to Salvage Chief LLC in which she was brought to a pier near the Tongue Point Job Corps Center. A non-profit Salvage Chief Foundation has been raising money to convert her into a museum ship ever since. The cost needed is $3.0 million.

== Awards ==
LST-380 have earned the following awards:

- American Campaign Medal
- China Service Medal (extended)
- Navy Occupation Service Medal (with Asia clasp)
- World War II Victory Medal
