= Bombardment of Fort Stevens =

1942 engagement in the American Theatre of World War II

Coordinates: 46°12′7″N 123°57′45″W

- Part of the American theater and the Pacific Theater of World War II
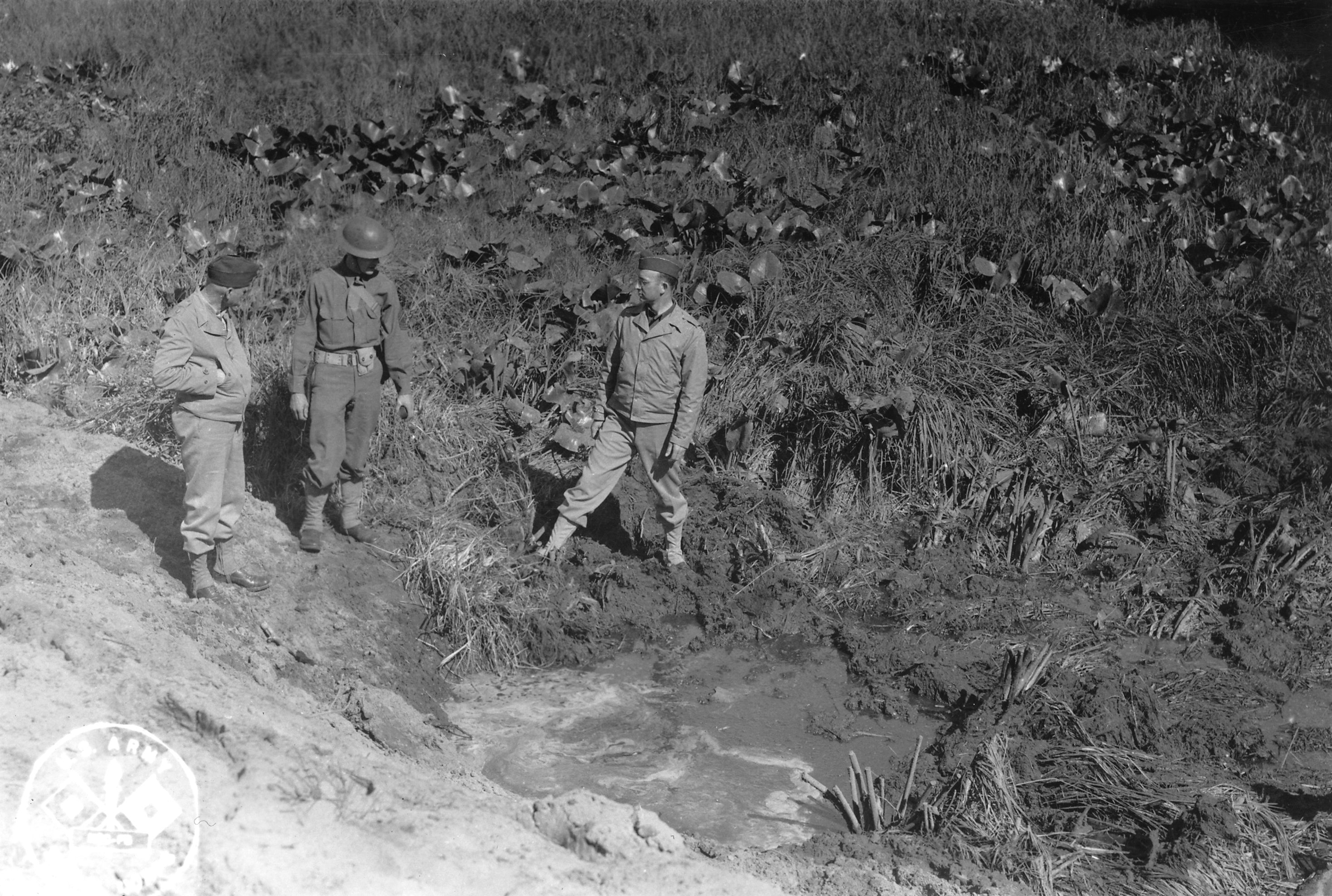
- American servicemen inspecting a shell crater after the Japanese attack on Fort Stevens
Date	21 June 1942
Location	Fort Stevens, Oregon, Pacific Ocean
Result	Inconclusive

Belligerents
United States	Japan

Commanders and leaders
Carl S. Doney	Akiji Tagami

Strength
Land: 2 artillery pieces 1 fort Air: 1 aircraft	1 submarine

Casualties and losses
Minor damage	None

The Bombardment of Fort Stevens occurred in June 1942, in the American Theater and the Pacific Theater of World War II. The Imperial Japanese submarine I-25 fired on Fort Stevens, which defended the Oregon side of the Columbia River's Pacific entrance.

== Bombardment ==
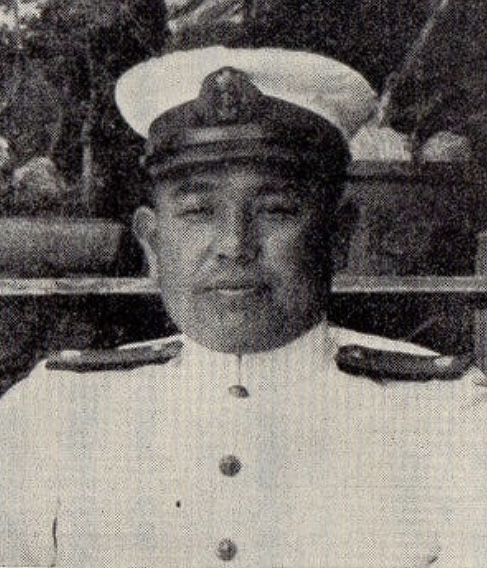
Lt. Cmdr. Meiji (Akiji) Tagami

The Imperial Japanese Navy submarine I-25, commanded by Akiji Tagami, had been assigned to sink enemy shipping and attack the enemy on land with its 14 cm deck gun. Transporting a Yokosuka E14Y seaplane, the submarine was manned by a crew of 97. On 21 June 1942, I-25 had entered U.S. coastal waters, following fishing boats to avoid the mine fields in the area.

Late that night, Commander Tagami ordered his crew to surface his submarine at the mouth of the Columbia River. His target was Fort Stevens, which dated to the American Civil War and was armed with more or less obsolete Endicott era artillery, including 12 in (305 mm) mortars and several 10 in (254 mm) and 6 in (152 mm) disappearing guns.

Tagami ordered the deck gun crew to open fire on Fort Stevens' Battery Russell. Surprisingly, his shots were harmless, in part because the fort's commander, Colonel Carl S. Doney, ordered an immediate blackout. Doney also refused to permit his men to return fire, which would have revealed their position. Spotting the enemy gun flashes with a depression position finder indicated the submarine was out of range.

Most Japanese rounds landed in a nearby baseball field or a swamp, although one landed close to Battery Russell and another next to a concrete pillbox. One round damaged several large telephone cables, the only real damage that Tagami caused. A total of seventeen explosive shells were fired at the fort.

United States Army Air Forces planes on a training mission spotted the I-25 and called in her location for an A-29 Hudson bomber to attack. The bomber found the target, but the I-25 successfully dodged the falling bombs and submerged undamaged.

== Aftermath ==
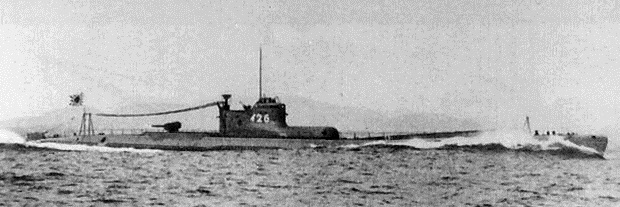
I-25

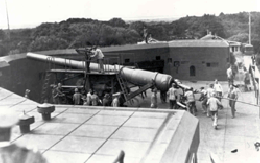
A 10-inch (254 mm) gun at Fort Stevens

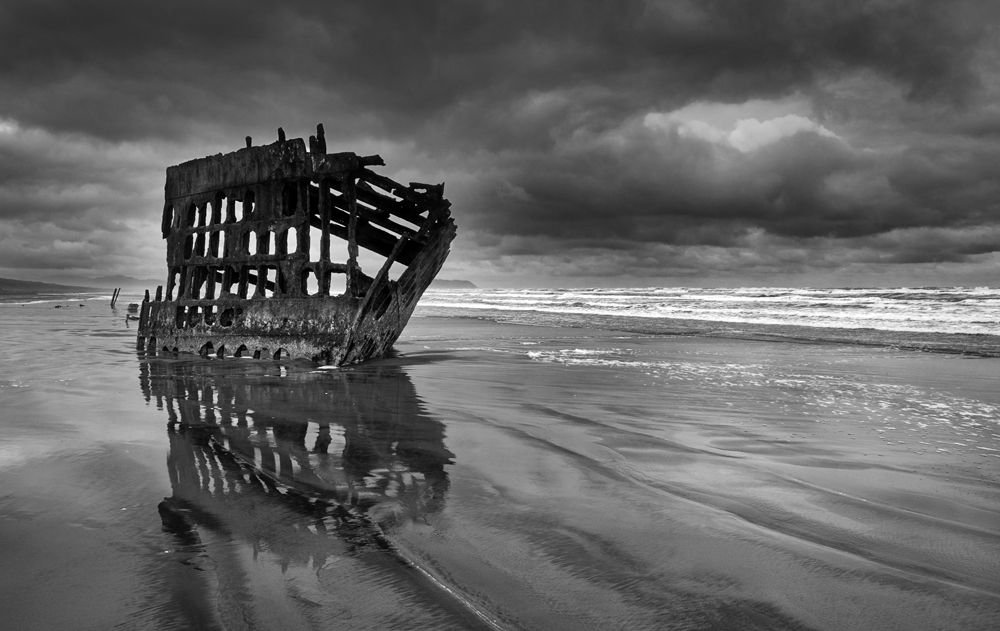
The wreck of the Peter Iredale

Even though there were no injuries and very little damage, the Japanese attack on Fort Stevens along with the Aleutian Islands Campaign the same month helped create the 1942 full-scale West Coast invasion scare. Thereafter, rolls of barbed wire would be strung from Point Adams, near the mouth of the Columbia River, southward in case of an invasion. The wrecked British barque Peter Iredale was entangled in the wire and would remain so until the war's end.

The Fort Stevens shelling marked the only time that a military base in the contiguous United States was attacked by the Axis powers during World War II, and was the second time a continental U.S. military base was attacked by an enemy since the bombing of Dutch Harbor two weeks earlier.

== See also ==
- Attacks on the United States
- World War I Bombardment of Madras
- World War I Bombardment of Orleans
- World War II German attacks on Nauru
- World War II Bombardment of Ellwood
- World War II "Battle of Los Angeles"
