= New Carissa =

20th-century freighter

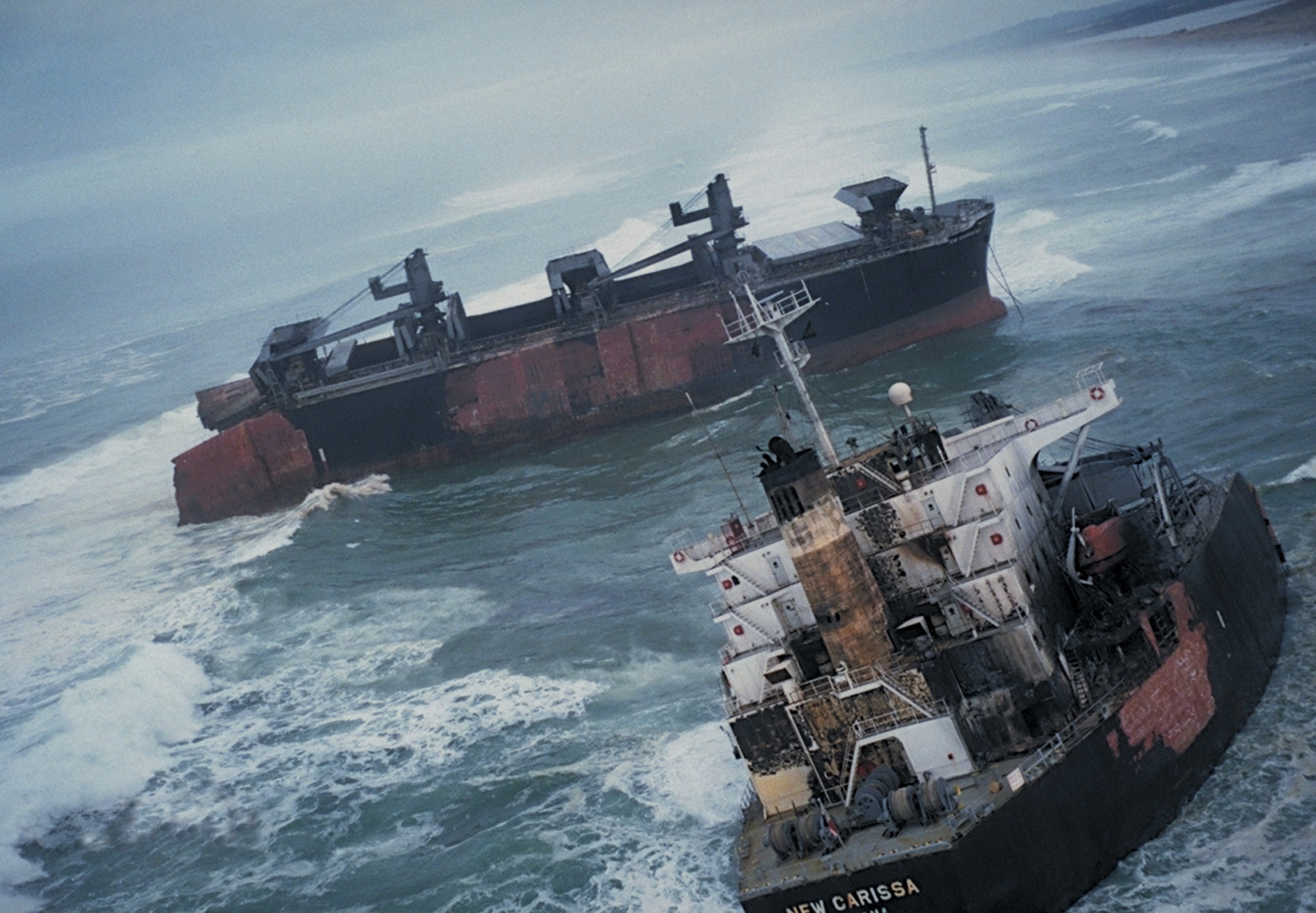
- New Carissa broken in two

History

Philippines
- Name: New Carissa
- Owner: Green Atlas Shipping, Panama
- Operator: Taiheiyo Kaiun Co. Ltd., Japan
- Port of registry: Manila
- Ordered: September 1988
- Builder: Imabari Shipbuilding, Japan
- Yard number: 1172
- Laid down: 28 February 1989
- Launched: 22 June 1989
- Completed: 30 August 1989
- In service: 1989–1999
- Identification: IMO number: 8716136; Call sign: DVUI
- Fate: Ran aground near Coos Bay, Oregon, U.S., on 4 February 1999; broke apart on beach. Bow towed out to sea, sunk. Stern section remained ashore until being dismantled and removed in 2008. 43°23′55″N 124°18′43″W

General characteristics
- Type: Woodchips carrier
- Tonnage: 36,571 GT; 16,524 NT; 44,527 DWT
- Length: 194.89 m (639 ft 5 in)
- Beam: 32.2 m (105 ft 8 in)
- Draft: 10.8 m (35 ft 5 in)
- Installed power: Mitsubishi-Sulzer 6RTA52; 6,032 kW (8,089 hp)
- Propulsion: Single shaft; fixed pitch propeller
- Speed: 13.5 knots (25.0 km/h; 15.5 mph)
- Capacity: 91,814 m^{3} (3,242,400 cu ft)
- Crew: 26

MV New Carissa was a freighter that ran aground and broke apart on a beach near Coos Bay, Oregon, United States, during a storm in February 1999. An attempt to tow the bow section of the ship out to sea failed when the tow line broke, and the bow was grounded again. Eventually, the bow was successfully towed out to sea and sunk. The stern section remained on the beach for over nine years until it was dismantled and removed in 2008.

The United States Coast Guard performed an investigation and found that error on the part of the captain was the main cause of the wreck; however, neither the captain nor the crewmembers were charged with any crime. There were significant financial consequences for New Carissa's owners and insurer. Fuel on board the ship was burned off in situ with napalm, but a significant amount was also spilled from the wreckage, causing ecological damage to the coast.

== Vessel ==
New Carissa was a Philippine-flagged dry bulk freighter optimized for carriage of woodchips (used for paper pulp production). The vessel was built by Imabari Shipbuilding of Japan using an all-steel construction and was laid down on 30 August 1989. She was 195 meters (640 ft) long and 32 meters (105 ft) wide, with a draft of 10.8 meters (35.4 ft) when fully loaded. She had a gross tonnage of 36,571 and a net tonnage of 16,524 and was powered by an 8,200 bhp (6,100 kW) direct-drive diesel engine.

New Carissa was owned by the Japanese shipping concern Nippon Yusen Kaisha through a Panamanian subsidiary, Green Atlas Shipping. Her operator and manager, Taiheiyo Kaiun Co. Ltd. and TMM Co. Ltd. respectively, were also based in Japan. Her home port was Manila, Philippines, and her crew at the time of her grounding consisted entirely of Philippine nationals, commanded by Benjamin Morgado. New Carissa's protection and indemnity insurance was provided by the Britannia Steam Ship Insurance Association Ltd. The ship's Certificate of Financial Responsibility, which is required by the Oil Pollution Act of 1990 and included US$23 million of environmental liability insurance, was provided by Shipowners Insurance and Guaranty Company Ltd. (SIGCo) of Hamilton, Bermuda.

== Grounding ==
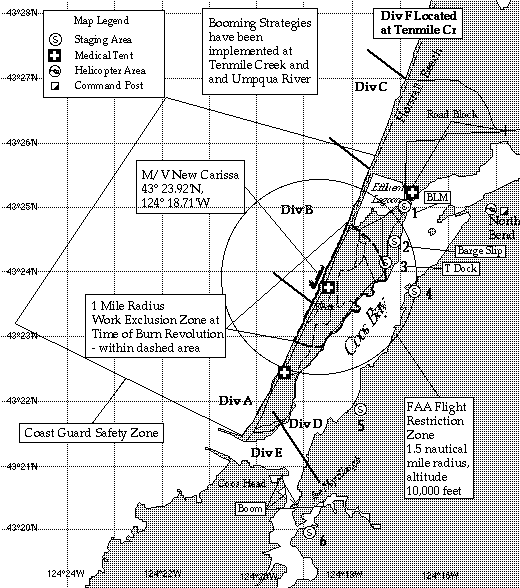
Incident map of the New Carissa wreck, 14 February 1999

In February 1999, New Carissa was bound for the Port of Coos Bay to pick up a load of woodchips. The local bar pilot advised the vessel not to enter the harbor on the evening of 3 February because of high seas and strong winds. Captain Morgado ordered the ship to drop anchor 1.7 nautical miles (3.1 km) off the coast in order to ride out the storm. The crew used a single anchor to secure the ship. According to a United States Coast Guard review of the incident, the chain used was too short, which, combined with winds of 20–25 knots (37–46 km/h), caused New Carissa to drag her anchor.

Poor navigational techniques and inadequate watchkeeping led to the crew's failure to notice that their ship was moving. Once movement was detected, the crew attempted to raise anchor and maneuver away from the shore, but the weather and sea conditions made this difficult. By the time the anchor was raised, New Carissa had been pushed too close to the shore to recover. The ship ran aground on the beach 2.7 statute miles (4.5 km) north of the entrance to Coos Bay. Attempts to refloat her failed. Two of the ship's five fuel tanks began to leak fuel onto the beach, eventually spilling approximately 70,000 US gallons (260 m^{3}) of viscous "bunker C" fuel oil and diesel onto the beach and into the water.

Neither the captain nor any of the 22-man crew was injured in the incident.

== Rescue and recovery operations ==
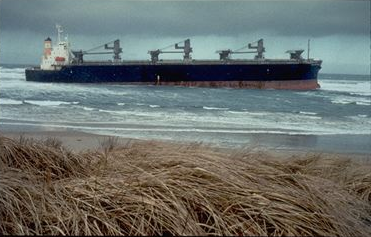
New Carissa, still intact shortly after running aground

Recovery operations began immediately when the grounding was first reported by the ship's crew. Several factors combined to severely complicate the operation. A Unified Command for the operation, consisting of representatives from the Coast Guard, the State of Oregon, and rescue party operations, was quickly established.

=== Initial rescue attempts ===
Initial rescue operations were hampered by inclement weather. Attempts to move New Carissa under her own power failed, and tugboat assistance was not available immediately after the grounding. Only one tugboat was available locally, but she was unable to cross the Coos Bay bar because of safety concerns. It was also uncertain whether or not the locally available tugboat could have successfully rescued New Carissa. The nearest salvage tugboat capable of towing a large ship off a beach, Salvage Chief, was moored at her home port of Astoria, 200 statute miles (320 km) to the north, a 24-hour journey away. Salvage Chief had not sailed in over a year, and it took 18 hours to fuel, provision, and find a crew for the ship. Once mobilized, poor weather in the Astoria area prevented the tugboat from crossing the treacherous Columbia River bar for an additional two days. Salvage Chief did not arrive in the area until 8 February, four days after the grounding occurred.

Continued poor weather drove New Carissa closer to the shore. Technical teams from two salvage contractors, Smit International and Salvage Master, had been working with the Coast Guard since 5 February and had drawn up plans to attempt to refloat the vessel, but when cracks in the hull and oil leaks were observed on 8 February, any refloating attempts were precluded by the focus on preventing of a large-scale oil spill. In addition, Salvage Chief, upon her arrival, was unable to reach New Carissa with her tow gear. On 10 February, New Carissa suffered major structural failure when the hull breached near the engine room, flooding the engines with seawater (and thus disabling them). The ship's insurers declared the vessel to be a total loss. As a result, New Carissa was no longer a salvageable vessel; instead, she had effectively become a shipwreck.

=== Wreck recovery operations ===
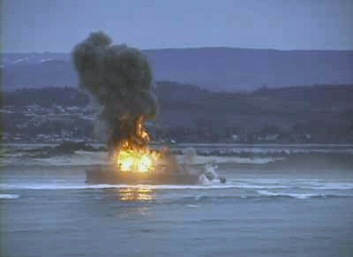
New Carissa's fuel tanks are ignited.

Since the vessel was no longer seaworthy and could not move under its own power, even if freed from the beach, the focus of the operation changed. Oil from the ship's fuel tanks continued to pose an environmental hazard, a situation exacerbated by both the ship's structural failure and continuing pounding from the surf. In order to mitigate the damage the Unified Command decided to set the fuel tanks on fire in order to burn off the oil. The first attempt was made on 10 February. Napalm and other incendiary devices were used to ignite the fuel, but only one of the diesel tanks was burned effectively. A second attempt was made on 11 February when US Navy explosive experts placed 39 shaped charges to breach the top of the fuel tanks from within the cargo holds. 602 U.S. gallons (2,280 L) of napalm and nearly 397 pounds (180 kg) of plastic explosives were also used to ignite the fuel on board. The ship burned for approximately 33 hours. Additional smaller-scale attempts were made to burn more oil over the next two days, with limited success. The total amount of oil that was burned is estimated to be between 165,000 and 255,000 US gallons (620 and 970 m^{3}). The structural stress caused by the fire, combined with continued severe weather, caused the vessel to break into two sections around midnight on 11 February.

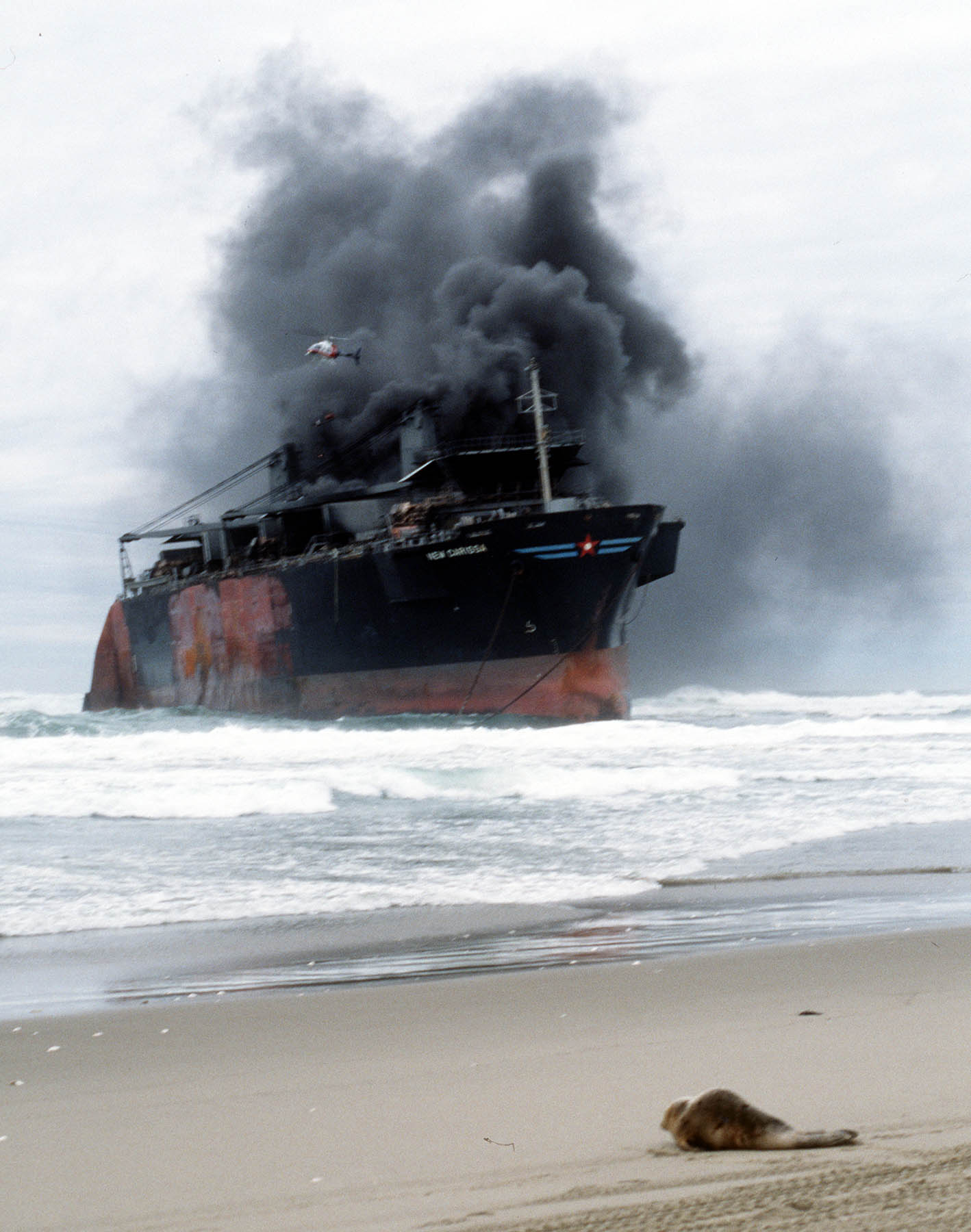
New Carissa's fuel burns as a harbor seal (Phoca vitulina) (bottom right) looks on.

After additional weather-related delays, on 26 February salvors managed to float the 440-foot (134 m) bow section and began the process of towing it out to sea for disposal. By 1 March, the tugboat Sea Victory had towed the bow from the beach and out to sea, initially followed by an oil skimmer vessel, OSRV Oregon Responder. However, another severe storm forced the skimmer back to port, and when the tug was 50 miles (80 km) off the coast, the tow line broke. The bow section floated for fourteen hours until it ran aground near Waldport, Oregon on 3 March, approximately 80 miles (129 km) to the north of the original grounding site. On 8 March, the bow was again refloated, and by 11 March it was successfully towed 280 miles (451 km) off the coast by Sea Victory and a second tug, Natoma. At this location, the Pacific Ocean is approximately 10,000 feet (3,048 m) deep. The bow was sunk by two US Navy ships, the destroyer USS David R. Ray and the submarine USS Bremerton. Four hundred pounds (180 kg) of high explosives were attached to the bow and detonated. Sixty-nine rounds of gunfire from David R. Ray's 5-inch (127 mm) deck guns then punctured the hull. After 40 minutes, the ship was still afloat with darkness and a storm approaching. To expedite the sinking, Bremerton fired a Mark 48 torpedo at the underside of the ship. Within ten minutes, the bow section flooded and sank stern-first, trapping the remaining oil within.

The stern section remained aground, but did not pose a significant oil spill threat as the majority of the oil on board had already leaked or burned. Some remaining oil that was found on board was skimmed or pumped out manually. In June 1999, Green Atlas awarded a ship breaking contract to Donjon Marine Co. and Fred Devine Diving and Salvage. Although the two companies were able to remove approximately one-third of the stern, their attempts to dismantle the largest section or tow it to sea were unsuccessful and had to be abandoned over the winter. Work did not resume in the spring of 2000, and in 2001, a salvage expert hired by Green Atlas asserted that the stern should not be removed because it would create a dangerous work environment. The state later accused Green Atlas of sabotaging the stern removal effort in order to save money and a protracted legal battle ensued.

== Dismantling and removal of stern section ==
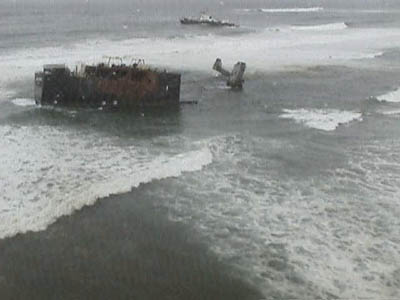
The stern of New Carissa rests on the beach, 7 October 1999.

Although the initial attempts to dismantle or tow the stern to sea failed, the State of Oregon still intended to see the remainder of the vessel removed from the beach. In 2006, the state's lawsuit against the ship's owners was settled, clearing the legal obstacles that prevented removal and providing the funds necessary to finance the project. Removal plans were complicated by the fact that the stern had become deeply embedded in the sand in the seven years since the wreck, with some portions of the stern estimated to be 20 to 30 feet (6 to 9 m) below the sand line.

A project to remove the stern by dismantling it on the beach was started in June 2008, after Oregon legislative approval. The dismantling, expected to cost US$18 million, was approved by the State Legislative Emergency Board in September 2006. The move was originally scheduled for 2007, but delays in the negotiations pushed the project back a year. Due to weather and surf conditions, the project had to be undertaken during the spring and summer months. Titan Maritime Company, a subsidiary of Crowley Maritime Corporation, signed a US$16.4 million contract with the Oregon Department of State Lands. Titan Maritime used large jackup barges, Karlissa A and Karlissa B, for the New Carissa dismantling project. Once the barges were in place, a cable car system was installed to allow the crews and their equipment access to the barges from the beach. The barges allowed the crews to access the wreck from 40 feet (12 m) above the surf. The crews cut New Carissa into removable pieces and then lifted them to the barges with cranes. The cutting portion of Titan's plan was largely completed by 31 July 2008, and the company then focused on pulling the stern from the sand, a process that was measured in inches. The project's managing director expressed confidence that the removal deadline of 1 October 2008 would be met. By September 2008, Titan had successfully removed the majority of the wreck; no part of the ship was visible from above the water and only a few small pieces remained submerged. Karlissa A and Karlissa B were relocated on 12 October 2008, and Titan's shore operations were completely removed by November 2008.

=== Debate about removal ===
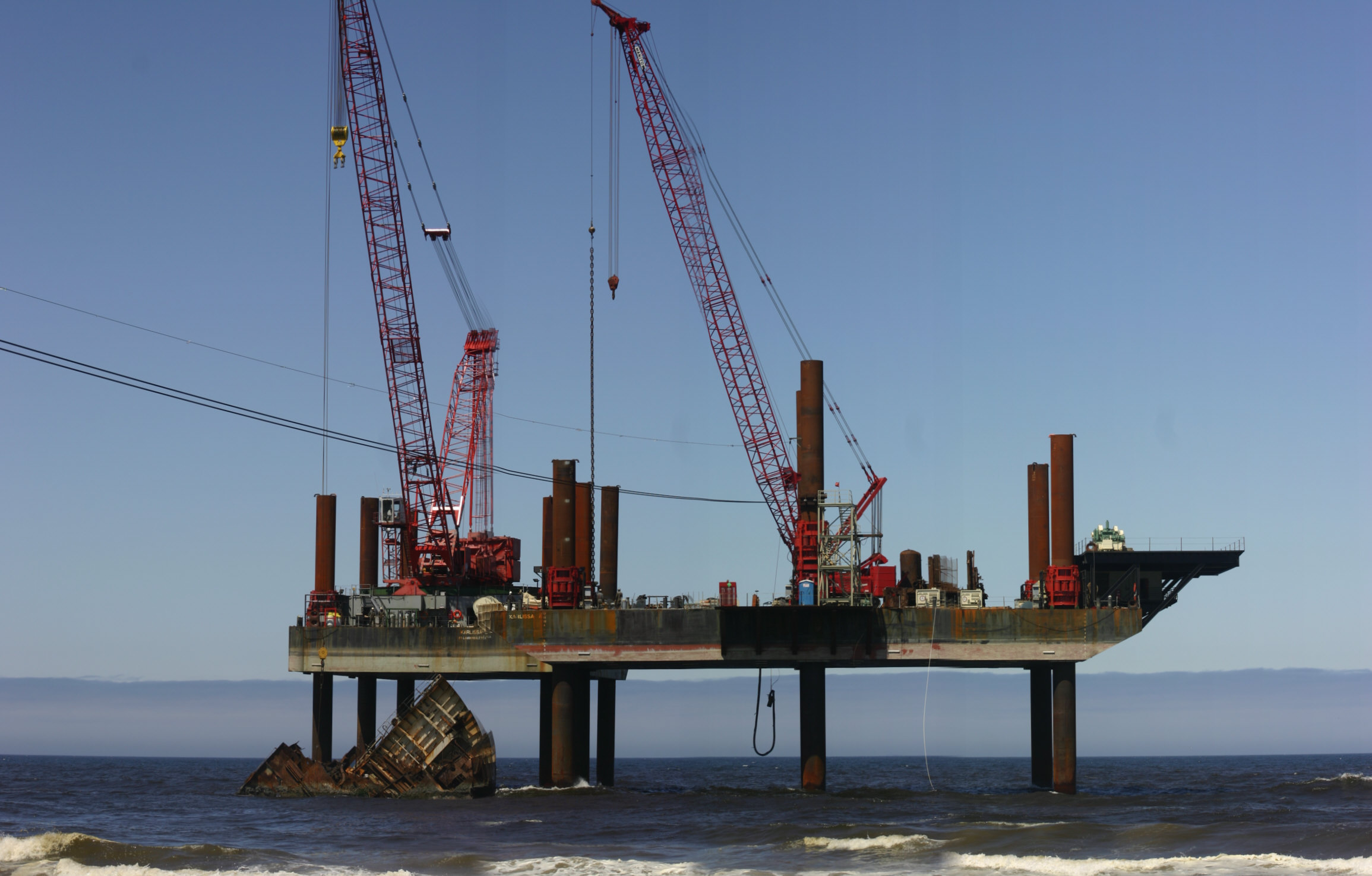
Titan Maritime jackup barges and cranes during New Carissa dismantling, July 2008

Prior to the dismantling project, there was debate by local residents on whether the wrecked stern should be removed. Some local officials believed the stern, which lay on a remote area of the beach, was not a hazard or an eyesore. Arnie Roblan, a state representative from Coos Bay, called the wreck a potential tourist attraction. For some residents, uncertainty remained surrounding Titan's removal plan, with the worry that the stern would be unable to withstand the force of the hydraulic pullers and that parts of the ship already buried in the sand would be unmovable. The president of the Coos Bay city council expressed concern that the proposed removal operation could cause ecological damage that would not occur if the ship were left on the beach. He further noted that "shipwrecks on the Oregon Coast are part of our history. There are a lot of ways you could better spend the money here." Many environmentalists, as well as federal biologists and residents of the local community, were concerned about the potential for further ecological damage should the vessel leak any of the fuel oil that remained on board.

Many others argued that the ship should be removed. Louise Solliday, the director of the Oregon Department of State Lands, called the removal of the stern a necessary step to demonstrate that the state is "serious about removing wrecks". She stated that if the stern were not removed, the argument that the ship is trespassing on state property (used in the state's lawsuit against New Carissa owners) would be undermined should another vessel wreck off the Oregon coast. The sentiment was later echoed by Oregon Secretary of State Bill Bradbury, who also noted that the settlement of the lawsuit with the ship's owners leaves the state exposed to any liability issues concerning the ship. The editorial board of The Oregonian argued that allowing the stern to remain would send a message that the state is willing to "tolerate permanent damage to its beaches". The newspaper also rejected the notion that the wreckage should be compared to Peter Iredale, a sailing ship that wrecked on a beach near Astoria in the early 1900s, the remnants of which are a popular tourist draw.

== Environmental impact ==
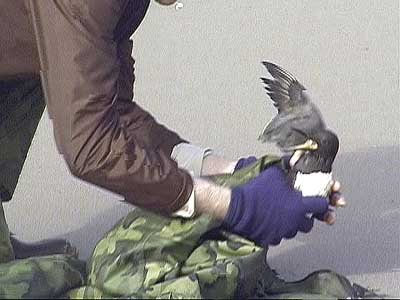
An oil-soaked bird is rescued by a cleanup worker after the New Carissa wreck.

The wreck of New Carissa caused one of the most serious oil spills to affect the state of Oregon, and the worst since a 1984 spill near Longview, Washington, that dumped 200,000 US gallons (760 m^{3}) of oil into the Columbia River. As Oregon has no significant oil refinery facilities, oil tankers do not often dock at its ports, making the state relatively safe from oil spills. Analysis conducted by the U.S. Fish and Wildlife Service determined that over 3,000 shorebirds and seabirds perished. The birds belonged to more than 50 species. Among the birds killed were 262 threatened marbled murrelets and between four and eight endangered western snowy plovers. Harbor seals, fish, and shellfish were also killed or affected. Several beaches were fouled, with tarballs continuing to wash up for more than a month after the wreck.

Despite the loss of marine life, the initial burning of the oil and the successful removal of the bow section prevented what could have been a worse spill. Captain Mike Hall of the Coast Guard stated that "at least 82 percent of the oil on board New Carissa never reached the wildlife or the pristine shoreline of Oregon's coast". The environmental impact of the sinking of the bow section was thought to be minimized since it was towed out beyond the continental shelf, into very deep water. Any remaining oil on board is unlikely to have affected marine life since the low temperatures at the bottom of the ocean would have caused it to solidify.

Prior to the stern section's removal from the beach, environmentalists and local officials were concerned that the remains posed a continuing environmental and safety hazard.

== Legal aftermath ==
Subsequent litigation proved expensive for the ship's owners and insurers, and an investigation into the incident delayed most of the crew's return to their home country.

=== Litigation ===
In 2001, Green Atlas Shipping and its insurer, Britannia Steam Ship Insurance Association, sued the United States for US$96 million, claiming negligence on the part of the Coast Guard due to faulty nautical charts. They also alleged failure on the part of the local bar pilots to advise the ship's crew not to anchor in the area, and that dredging by the United States Army Corps of Engineers had exacerbated the problems with the anchor. The U.S. countersued for US$7 million in damages. In 2004, the two sides reached an agreement in which Green Atlas would pay the U.S. US$10.5 million to assist with cleanup costs, and the U.S. paid Green Atlas US$4 million in settlement of the faulty charts claim. The net result of the settlement was payment of US$6.5 million to the U.S. Although this was far less than the damages claimed by the U.S. for environmental cleanup and restoration costs, government officials still saw the settlement as a victory since the shipping company was forced to pay for part of the damage. Some Coos County officials were dissatisfied with the settlement and stated that it should have instead been paid to local business owners who were negatively impacted by the closure of the beach.

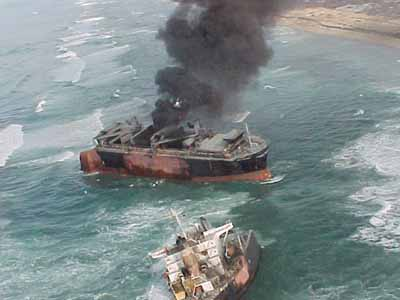
New Carissa, after breaking into two sections

The State of Oregon demanded that the ship's owners or their insurers remove the ship or pay a US$25 million bond to cover the cost of removing the ship and for environmental damages. The state also filed a lawsuit in Coos County, demanding removal, storage fees of US$1,500 per day, restoration of the beach, and other unspecified damages. The state alleged negligence on the part of Morgado and also accused Green Atlas shipping of attempting to avoid the expense of the stern dismantling. On 13 November 2002, a Coos County jury found the ship's owners guilty of negligent trespass after a six-week trial; the state was awarded US$25 million in damages. That sum was placed in escrow, pending appeal. The circuit court judge later remarked that the case was the most memorable of his 37-year career, noting that "You don't usually get trespass cases that involve a ship". On 23 May 2006, a settlement was reached in the appeal; the state kept US$20 million of the US$25 million in escrow, plus US$2.1 million in interest earned on the escrow account. The remaining US$5 million was returned to Green Atlas Shipping. Of the US$22.1 million that the state was awarded in the settlement, US$3.1 million was used to pay the state's legal fees. The remaining US$19 million was reserved for cleanup, including the removal of the vessel's stern.

Numerous private parties, including at least one oyster farmer whose beds were contaminated by oil, successfully sued for damages.

=== Crew investigation ===
The captain and most of the crew of the ship—all nationals of the Philippines—had to face a U.S. Coast Guard Board of Inquiry, which required them to remain in the United States for several weeks after the wreck. In addition, a federal grand jury investigated the incident for criminal wrongdoing. Captain Morgado refused to answer many of the questions posed at the inquiry, citing his Fifth Amendment rights. The crew was released after their testimony and returned to the Philippines. On 16 September, the Coast Guard issued its findings that captain's error was the primary cause of the wreck, with the first and third officers of the ship also partly responsible. The investigation found no evidence of criminal wrongdoing, and no charges were filed against any member of the New Carissa crew.
