= Peter Iredale =

Four-masted steel barque

Coordinates: 46.178361°N 123.981003°W

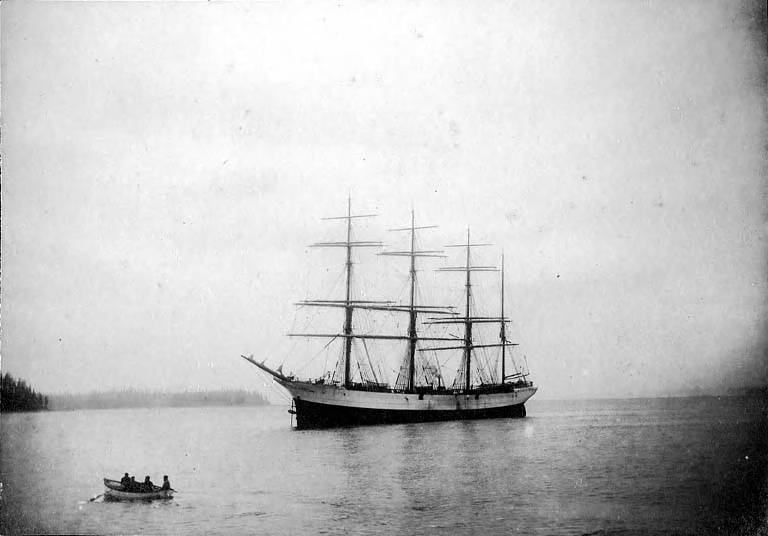
Peter Iredale in Seattle, circa 1900

Peter Iredale was a four-masted steel barque that ran ashore October 25, 1906, on the Oregon coast en route to the Columbia River. She was abandoned on Clatsop Spit near Fort Stevens in Warrenton about four miles (6 km) south of the Columbia River channel. Wreckage is still visible, making it a popular tourist attraction as one of the most accessible shipwrecks of the Graveyard of the Pacific.

== Namesake ==
The ship was named after Peter Iredale, who not only owned the vessel as part of his shipping fleet, but was also a well-known figure in Liverpool, England, where his business was headquartered.

The ship was built in Maryport in June 1890, by R. Ritson & Co Ltd for P. Iredale & Porter. She measured 2,075 net register tons and was 87 meters (285 ft) in length. The vessel was fashioned from steel plates on an iron frame. She had royal sails above double top and topgallant sails, and was the largest vessel built by Ritson. The ship was originally commanded by Captain G.A. Brown and later by Captain H. Lawrence.

== Wreck ==
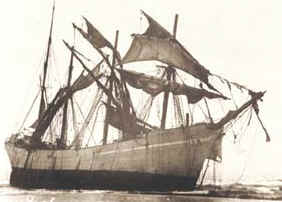
Peter Iredale shortly after grounding in 1906

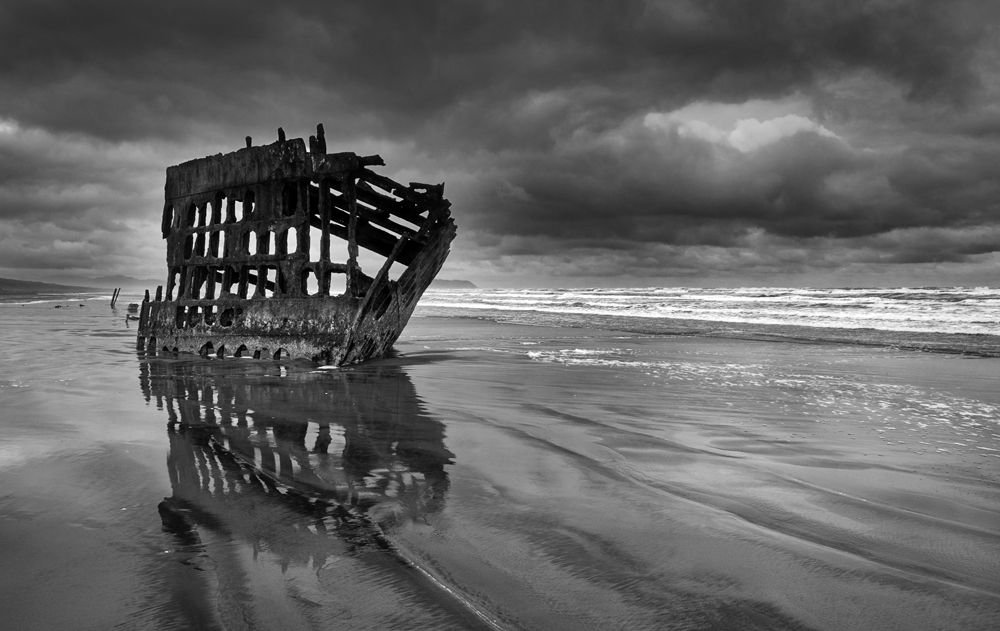
The wreck of the Peter Iredale in 2012

Sailing from Salina Cruz, Mexico, on or about September 26, 1906, Peter Iredale was bound for Portland, Oregon with 1,000 tons of ballast and a crew of 27, including two stowaways. The voyage up the coast was unremarkable until the night of 25 October, when Captain H. Lawrence sighted the Tillamook Rock Lighthouse at 3:20 a.m. local time. The crew altered course first east-northeast and then northeast to enter the mouth of the Columbia River in thick mist and a rising tide. Under strong winds out of the west, an attempt was made to wear the ship away from shore, but a heavy northwest squall grounded Peter Iredale on Clatsop Sands (now called Clatsop Spit). High seas and wind drove the ship ashore. A lifeboat was dispatched from Hammond, Oregon and assisted in evacuating the sailors, who were tended to at Fort Stevens. No casualties occurred in the accident.

A Naval Court inquiry was held in Astoria on November 12 and 13, 1906, by the British Vice-Consulate to determine the cause of the wreck. After investigating, no blame was placed on Lawrence and the crew for the loss, and he and his officers were commended for their attempts to save the ship.

There was little damage to the hull and plans were made to tow the ship back to sea, but after several weeks waiting for favorable weather and ocean conditions, the ship had listed to port (left) and become embedded in the sands. The salvage rights to the ship were sold in 1917, though the wreck was never actually broken up. All that remains is the bow, a few ribs, and a couple of masts.

Captain Lawrence's final toast to his ship was: "May God bless you, and may your bones bleach in the sands."

== World War II ==
The Oregon Coast saw action on the night of June 21, 1942 from Japanese submarine I-25 during World War II when several shells were fired at Fort Stevens. Though the wrecked Peter Iredale was in the line of fire, no damage was done to it. The next day, rolls of barbed wire were strung from Point Adams southward to hamper a potential invasion of the United States Pacific Northwest, especially after Kiska and Attu Islands in Alaska fell under Japanese hands two weeks earlier. Peter Iredale was entwined in the wire and remained that way until the end of the war.

== Today ==
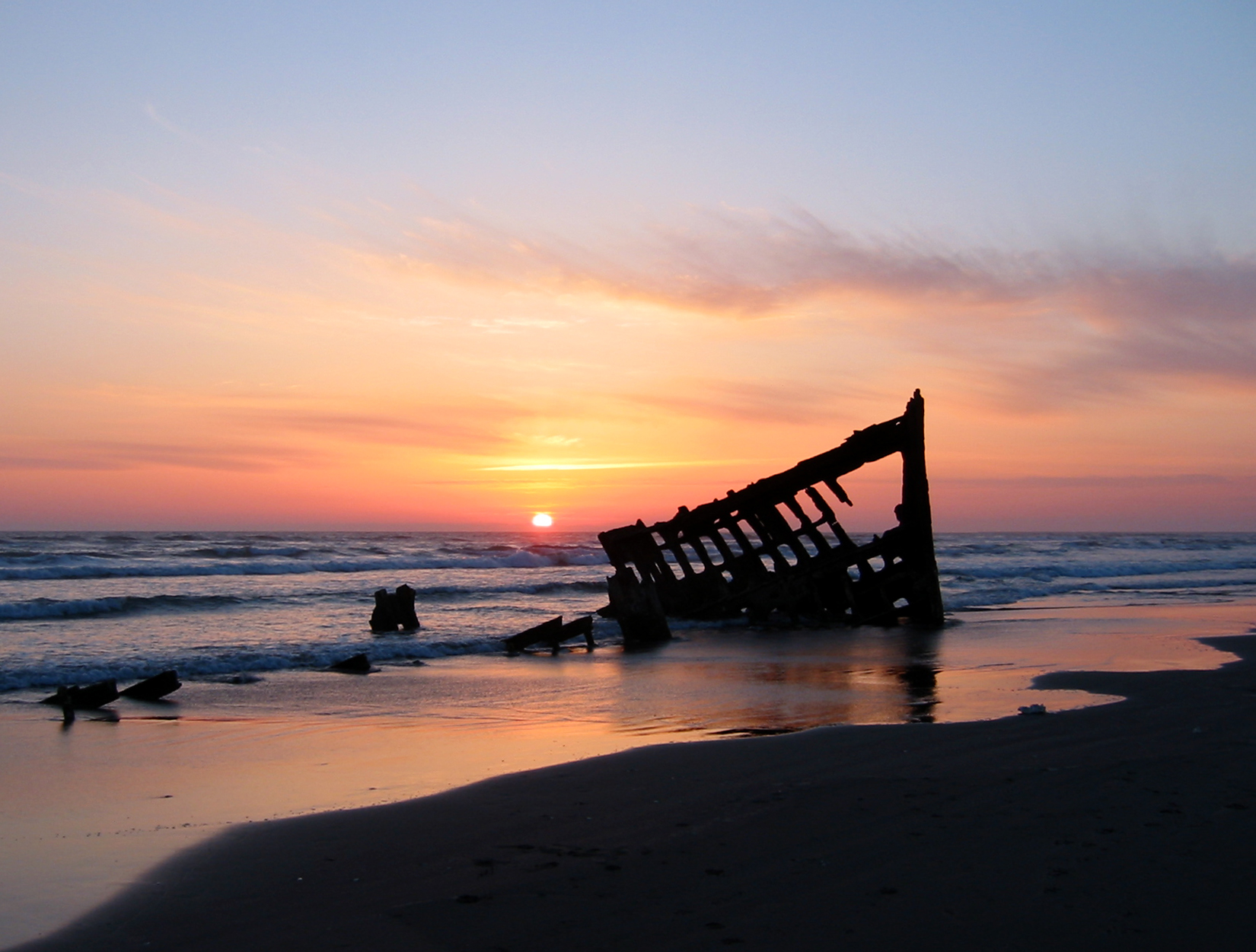
The wreck of Peter Iredale at sunset in 2003

Over a century since it ran aground, the remains of Peter Iredale's rusted bow and masts are still visible jutting out of the sand and are a popular tourist attraction. The wreck is contained within Fort Stevens State Park, which is part of Lewis and Clark National Historical Park.

== See also ==
- New Carissa (a more recent Oregon Coast shipwreck)
