= SS General Warren =

Coordinates: 46.2372°N 124.0107°W

SS General Warren was an American steamship that operated on the Pacific Coast until she wrecked off the Oregon Coast in 1852.

Named after General Joseph Warren her early history is unknown, but she began Pacific service in October 1850 under the ownership of Garrison & Fritz in Panama.

On January 28, 1852, she departed Astoria, Oregon bound for San Francisco under the command of Captain Charles Thompson with 52 people and a cargo of largely farm goods aboard. After crossing Clatsop Spit, she encountered heavy weather and began taking on water. On the morning of the 29th, she made a course back to the Columbia River, and in the afternoon boarded pilot George Flavel, who had brought her out the previous day. By evening the ebb tide was flowing strongly out from the river, and General Warren took on water while struggling to cross the spit, leading Captain Thompson to order her run aground on the sand. As the ship took heavy damage from the wind and waves, at about three in the morning on the 30th pilot Flavel and nine others took a small boat to Astoria. Reaching the harbor, they found another boat and crew to go back out to General Warren's location, but when they reached the sandbar again the ship had been completely destroyed with all on board lost.
