= Clatsop Spit =

Coastal landform in Oregon, US

Coordinates: 46°13′44″N 124°00′50″W

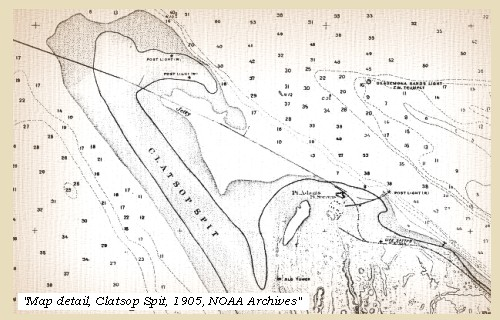
The northern end of Clatsop Spit, 1905

Clatsop Spit is an unusually large sand spit on the Pacific coast along U.S. Route 101 between Astoria and the north end of Tillamook Head in Clatsop County, northwest Oregon, at the mouth of the Columbia River. The Clatsop Spit was formed by sediment brought to the coast by the Columbia River after the last ice age ended and the ocean level rose approximately 8,500 years ago. Here it was worked over and shaped by the wind and the waves until a vast and sandy plain was formed. In regular conversation, referring to Clatsop Spit usually refers to the northern end of the spit: the area that is bound by the Pacific to the west and the Columbia River to the northeast. In the past, the spit was known as Clatsop Sands.

== Shipwrecks ==
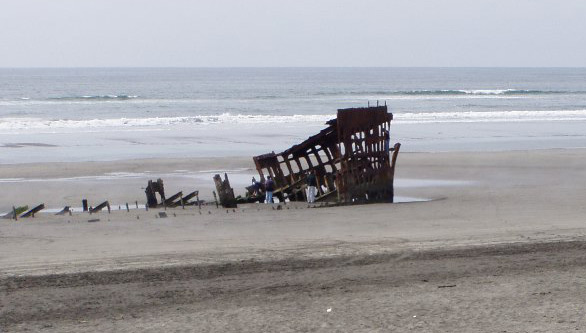
The wreck of the Peter Iredale as of May 2005

The seas around Clatsop Spit were known to be treacherous and there were many shipwrecks, including the paddle steamer General Warren in which 42 people died in the surf in 1852. In 1859, the schooner Rambler washed up on Clatsop Spit. No trace of her crew was ever found. In 1860, the barque Leonese washed up on Clatsop Spit upside down and her crew lost. In 1883 the crew of the luxury schooner J.C. Cousins operated by the State of Oregon similarly vanished as she washed ashore. Other shipwrecks include the barquentine Makah (1888), and the bark Peter Iredale in 1906. It is estimated that since 1800 more than 2,000 vessels and close to 1,000 lives have been lost at the mouth of the Columbia River and in this context it is referred to as the Graveyard of the Pacific.

== Geology ==
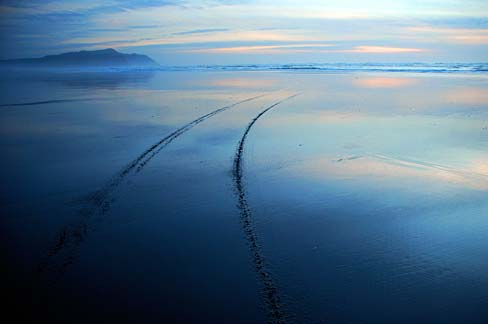
Clatsop Spit's Del Rey Beach looking south towards Tillamook Head

After the sea level along the coast rose to its current level approximately 8,500 years ago at the end of the last ice age, seasonal prevailing winds drove the Columbia River's sandy sediment to the Washington beaches in the winter and to Oregon's Clatsop Spit during the summer months. Through this process the sandy beaches grew dynamically to their present size, but it is unlikely they will continue this fast growth. Most of the sediment generated by the Columbia River is now trapped by a series of dams before it reaches the coast. Meanwhile, when the tide is out constantly shifting onshore winds blow sand from the exposed beaches inland on to huge sand dunes. However, during the 1930s most of the spectacular dunes were deliberately controlled by the planting of grass and shrubs to prevent the natural movement of the sand. Now the sand is stabilized by the covering of vegetation and are no longer endlessly in motion, dynamically shaped by the wind. Much of the original dune area now forms a region known as Clatsop Plains.

Clatsop Spit is now part of Fort Stevens State Park.

== See also ==
- Clatsop Plains
- Fort Clatsop
- Fort Stevens
- Gearhart
- Lewis and Clark National Historical Park
- Sand Island (Clatsop County, Oregon)
- Warrenton & Hammond
